= 1997–2002 Bolivian National Congress =

1997–2002 Term of the National Congress Congreso Nacional

Type
- Type: Bicameral
- Houses: Chamber of Senators, Chamber of Deputies

History
- Preceded by: 1993–97 Congress
- Succeeded by: 2002–06 Congress

Leadership
- President of the National Congress (ex oficio as Vice President): Jorge Quiroga, ADN since 6 August 1997 (Note: On 7 August 2001, President Hugo Banzer resigned for health reasons and Vice President Jorge Quiroga assumed the presidency. The President of the Chamber of Deputies Luis Vasquez Villamor then became President of the National Congress)
- Luis Vasquez Villamor, MIR since 7 August 2001
- President of the Senate: Wálter Guiteras Denis, ADN since August 1997
- Leopoldo Fernández, ADN since August 1999
- Enrique Toro Tejada, ADN since August 2001
- President of the Chamber of Deputies: Hormando Vaca Diez, MIR since August 1997
- Hugo Carvajal Donoso, MIR since August 1998
- Jaalil Melgar Mustafá, UCS since August 2000
- Luis Vasquez Villamor, MIR since August 2001

Structure
- Seats: 157; 27 Senators; 130 Deputies
- Chamber of Senators political groups: ADN (11): ADN (10); NFR (1); MIR (7): MIR (6); PCB (ML) (1); MNR (4); CONDEPA (3) UCS (2)
- Chamber of Deputies political groups: ADN (32): ADN (20); NFR (9); FSB (1); KND (1); PDC (1); MNR (26); MIR (23): MIR (21); PCB (ML) (1); ASD (1); UCS (21); CONDEPA (19); MBL (5) IU (4)

Elections
- Chamber of Senators voting system: Party-list proportional representation
- Chamber of Deputies voting system: Additional Member System
- Last Chamber of Senators election: 1 June 1997
- Last Chamber of Deputies election: 1 June 1997
- Next Chamber of Senators election: 30 June 2002
- Next Chamber of Deputies election: 30 June 2002

Meeting place
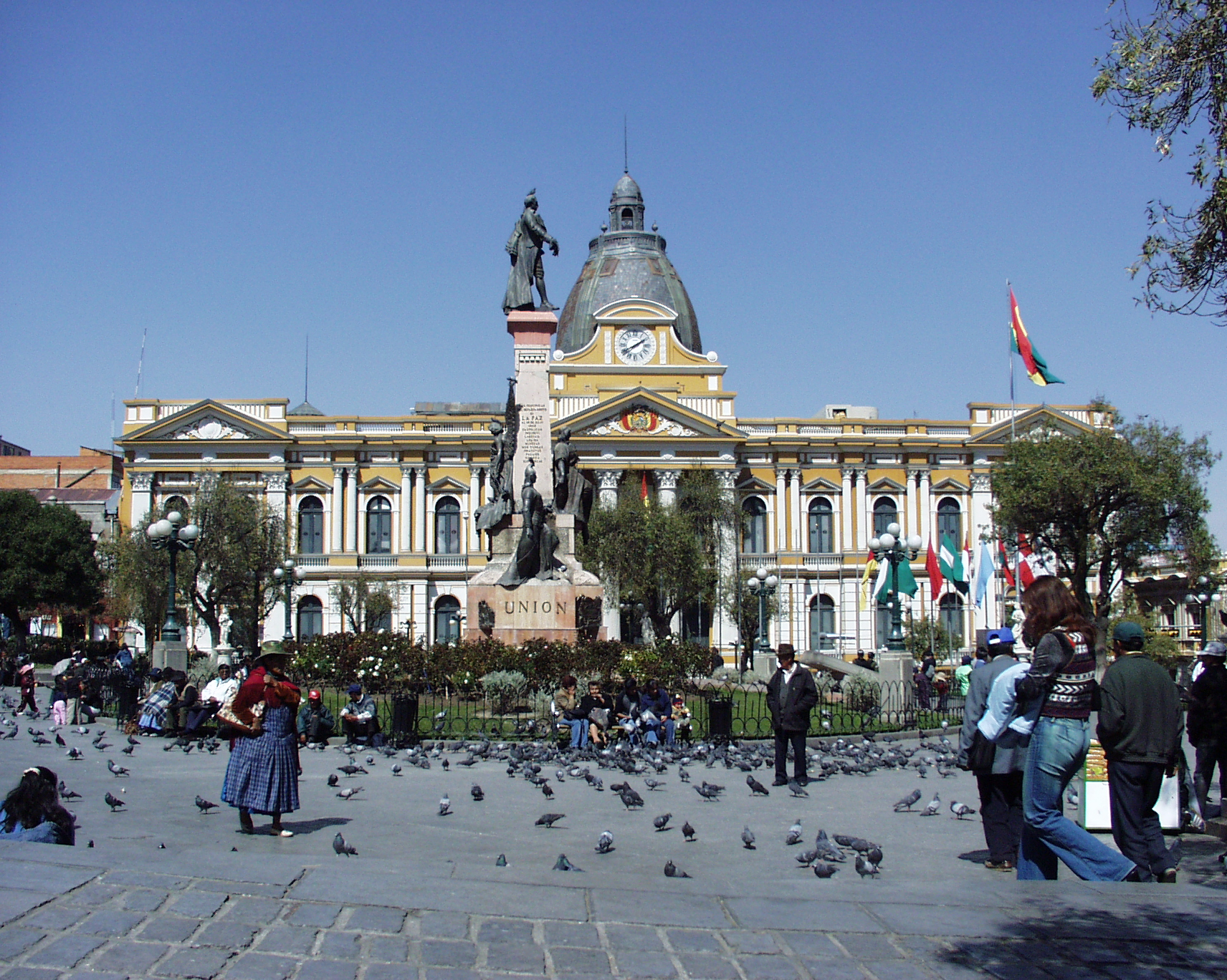
- Palace of Congress

The 1997–2002 Bolivian National Congress was a meeting of the Bolivian legislature composed of the Chamber of Senators and Chamber of Deputies. It met in La Paz from August 1997 to August 2002 during the presidencies of Hugo Banzer and Jorge Quiroga.

The Congress was elected as part of the general elections on 1 June 1997.

== Congressional presidential ballot ==
As no candidate reached the required popular vote majority, the newly elected Congress elected the president on 6 August.

Hugo Banzer of Nationalist Democratic Action (ADN) was elected with the support of Revolutionary Left Movement (MIR), Conscience of Fatherland (CONDEPA), and Solidarity Civic Unity (UCS). Juan Carlos Durán of the Revolutionary Nationalist Movement (MNR) received only the support of his own party. The United Left (IU) and the Free Bolivia Movement (MBL) abstained.

Candidate	Party	Votes	%
Hugo Banzer	Nationalist Democratic Action	118	79.73
Juan Carlos Durán	Revolutionary Nationalist Movement	30	20.27
Total		148	100.00
Total votes		148	–
Registered voters/turnout		157	94.27

== Leadership ==
=== National Congress ===
- President: Jorge Quiroga (ADN), until 7 August 2001
  - Luis Vasquez Villamor (MIR), from 7 August 2001

=== Chamber of Senators ===
- President: Wálter Guiteras Denis (ADN), until August 1999
  - Leopoldo Fernández (ADN), until August 2001
  - Enrique Toro Tejada (ADN), from August 2001

=== Chamber of Deputies ===
- President: Hormando Vaca Diez (MIR), until August 1998
  - Hugo Carvajal Donoso (MIR), until August 2000
  - Jaalil Melgar Mustafá (UCS), until August 2001
  - Luis Vasquez Villamor (MIR), from August 2001

== Composition ==
=== Chamber of Senators ===
1997–2002 members of the Chamber of Senators:

Senator	Department	Party
Enrique Toro Tejada	Chuquisaca	ADN
Gaston Encinas Valverde	Chuquisaca	MIR
Mario Paz Zamora	Chuquisaca	MIR
Carlos García Suarez	La Paz	CONDEPA
Guido Loayza Mariaca	La Paz	ADN
Reynaldo Venegas Iporre	La Paz	CONDEPA
Ericka Brockman Quiroga	Cochabamba	MIR
Gonzalo Molina Ossio	Cochabamba	NFR
Wálter Soriano Lea Plaza	Cochabamba	ADN
Armando Rosas Guzman	Oruro	ADN
Felix Alanoca Gonzales	Oruro	CONDEPA
José Sánchez Aguilar	Oruro	ADN
Edgar Lazo Loayza	Potosí	MIR
Gonzalo Valda Cardenas	Potosí	MIR
Wilson Antonio Lora Espada	Potosí	ADN
Leopoldo Lopez Cossio	Tarija	MIR
Óscar Zamora Medinaceli	Tarija	PCB (ML)
Raul Lema Patiño	Tarija	MNR
Freddy Teodovich Ortiz	Santa Cruz	MNR
Justo Yepez Kakuda	Santa Cruz	UCS
Rubén Enrique Poma Rojas	Santa Cruz	UCS
Miguel Majluf Morales	Beni	MNR
Peter Enrique Hecker Haase	Beni	ADN
Wálter Guiteras Denis	Beni	ADN
Felipe Jose Saucedo Gutierrez	Pando	MNR
José Villavicencio	Pando	ADN
Leopoldo Fernández	Pando	ADN

=== Chamber of Deputies ===
1997–2002 members of the Chamber of Deputies:

Deputy	Department	Party
Augusto Valda Vargas	Chuquisaca	MBL
Freddy Flores Avilez	Chuquisaca	UCS
Jaime Ponce Caballero	Chuquisaca	UCS
Gonzalo Aguirre Villafán	Chuquisaca	MBL
Jorge Alberto Sensano Zarate	Chuquisaca	ADN
Juan Felipe Carvajal Padilla	Chuquisaca	MNR
Maximo Fernando Rodriguez Calvo	Chuquisaca	ADN
Miguel Antoraz Chalup	Chuquisaca	MNR
Moises Torrez Ramirez	Chuquisaca	CONDEPA
Morgan López Baspineiro	Chuquisaca	MIR
Santiago Arana Bustillos	Chuquisaca	MIR
Andrés Soliz Rada	La Paz	CONDEPA
Benjamín Miguel Harb	La Paz	PDC
Carlos Chambi Ramos	La Paz	CONDEPA
Claudio Loza Alvarado	La Paz	CONDEPA
Daniel Santalla	La Paz	CONDEPA
David Crespo Gamarra	La Paz	NFR
Eduardo Paz Rada	La Paz	CONDEPA
Elisa Zuñiga de Siles	La Paz	ADN
Erick Alberto Reyes Villa Bacigalupi	La Paz	NFR
Facundo Hurtado Castellón	La Paz	CONDEPA
Fernando Kieffer Guzmán	La Paz	ADN
Gonzalo Ruiz Paz	La Paz	CONDEPA
Guido Capra Jemio	La Paz	MNR
Guillermo Bedregal Gutiérrez	La Paz	MNR
Jaime Gonzales Lopez	La Paz	CONDEPA
Jorge David Cazas Arevalo	La Paz	UCS
Jorge Eduardo Lorini Saenz	La Paz	UCS
Jorge Torres Obleas	La Paz	MIR
José Luis Paredes Muñoz	La Paz	MIR
Juan del Granado	La Paz	MBL
Juan Huanca Colque	La Paz	CONDEPA
Luis Alberto Valle Ureña	La Paz	ADN
Luis Llerena Gamez	La Paz	CONDEPA
Luis Vasquez Villamor	La Paz	MIR
Miguel Magne Saire	La Paz	CONDEPA
Mirian de Quintela Noguer	La Paz	UCS
Ramiro Fernandez Argandoña	La Paz	MNR
Remedios Loza	La Paz	CONDEPA
Roberto Moscoso Valderrama	La Paz	MNR
Toribio Tapia Valencia	La Paz	CONDEPA
Verónica Palenque	La Paz	CONDEPA
Alberto Gasser Vargas	Cochabamba	MNR
Armando de la Parra Soria	Cochabamba	PCB (ML)
Carlos Quiroga Blanco	Cochabamba	UCS
Félix Sanchéz Veizaga	Cochabamba	ASP
Franz Rivero Valda	Cochabamba	NFR
Gonzalo Maldonado Rojas	Cochabamba	NFR
José Carlos Sánchez Berzaín	Cochabamba	MNR
Evo Morales	Cochabamba	ASP
Marco Antonio Cartagena Terceros	Cochabamba	UCS
Miriam Maesse Ribera	Cochabamba	MIR
Néstor Guzmán Villarroel	Cochabamba	ASP
Olimpia Ugarte Bilbao	Cochabamba	UCS
Oscar Torrico Alvarado	Cochabamba	MIR
René Recacochea	Cochabamba	NFR
Roberto Fernandez Orosco	Cochabamba	NFR
Román Loayza Caero	Cochabamba	ASP
Tito Hoz de Vila	Cochabamba	ADN
Tonchy Marinkovic Uzqueda	Cochabamba	MIR
Carlos Raul Borth Irahola	Oruro	NFR
Eduardo Avilés Durán	Oruro	UCS
Elvis Ojeda Calluni	Oruro	MNR
Fernando Untoja Choque	Oruro	KND
Gladys Salazar de Perez Rios	Oruro	MNR
Luis Fernando Aramayo Lopez	Oruro	NFR
Magin Roque Humerez	Oruro	CONDEPA
Óscar Salas Moya	Oruro	ASD
Pedro Rubin de Celis Rojas	Oruro	CONDEPA
Raul Araoz Velasco	Oruro	MIR
Alejandro Centellas Quezada	Potosí	MIR
Bernard Joseph Inch Calvimonte	Potosí	NFR
Carlos Vicente Aranibar Escarcha	Potosí	MIR
Edgar Cueto Acebedo	Potosí	MBL
Edgar Jose Zegarra Bernal	Potosí	MNR
Felix Vasquez Mamani	Potosí	MBL
Hugo Soliz Villegas	Potosí	MNR
Jhonny Dario Plata Chalar	Potosí	CONDEPA
Juan Luis Choque Armijo	Potosí	MNR
Justo Raul Gomez Bustillos	Potosí	ADN
Leonor Alcon	Potosí	CONDEPA
Lourdes Villacorta Vega	Potosí	ADN
Luis Sanabria Taboada	Potosí	UCS
Raúl Angelo Porcel Gonzáles	Potosí	MIR
Walter Arce Diaz	Potosí	UCS
Arturo Juan Liebers Baldiviezo	Tarija	MIR
Francisco Vaca Gutiérrez	Tarija	MIR
Gonzalo Barrientos de Ugarte	Tarija	UCS
Hugo Carvajal Donoso	Tarija	MIR
Imel Copa Velasquez	Tarija	MNR
Justino Nolasco Llanos	Tarija	MNR
Never Eberto Vega Salinas	Tarija	ADN
Pedro Jesus Romero Sagredo	Tarija	MIR
Soledad Guerra Tovar	Tarija	MNR
Alejandro Colanzi Zeballos	Santa Cruz	UCS
Almeida Felicidad Barba Antelo	Santa Cruz	UCS
Ana Victoria Banegas Espinoza	Santa Cruz	ADN
Carlos Alberto Subirana Suarez	Santa Cruz	UCS
Carlos Edgar Chavez Teran	Santa Cruz	UCS
Edil Sandoval Moron	Santa Cruz	MNR
Gerardo Rosado Perez	Santa Cruz	MNR
Guido Añez Moscoso	Santa Cruz	MIR
Helen Mery Hayes Villagomez	Santa Cruz	MNR
Hormando Vaca Diez	Santa Cruz	MIR
Jaalil Melgar Mustafá	Santa Cruz	UCS
Jorge Landivar Roca	Santa Cruz	ADN
Luis Fernando Robert Landivar Roca	Santa Cruz	ADN
Luis Jorge Mayser Ardaya	Santa Cruz	FSB
Mario Diego Justiniano Aponte	Santa Cruz	MNR
Offman Blanco Pacheco	Santa Cruz	MNR
Roberto Fernandez Saucedo	Santa Cruz	UCS
Ronald Nieme Mendez	Santa Cruz	MNR
Saúl Guillermo Klinsky Callaú	Santa Cruz	UCS
Vicente Roca Gil	Santa Cruz	MIR
Victor Hugo Añez Campos	Santa Cruz	ADN
Wilmar Stelzer Jimenez	Santa Cruz	ADN
Carlos Hugo Iriarte Suarez	Beni	UCS
Edmundo Guiteras Denis	Beni	ADN
Guido Roca Villavicencio	Beni	ADN
Jorge Ribera Bruckner	Beni	UCS
Manuel Suárez Ávila	Beni	MNR
Millán Ribera Arteaga	Beni	MIR
Moisés Shiriqui	Beni	ADN
Oscar Montaño Rodriguez	Beni	MNR
Sandro Estefano Giordano Garcia	Beni	MNR
Adolfo Añez Ferreira	Pando	ADN
Emigdio Flores Calpiñeiro	Pando	MIR
Juan Carlos Riss Cecin	Pando	MNR
Miguel Becerra Suarez	Pando	ADN
Roger Pinto Molina	Pando	ADN
