= 1993–1997 Bolivian National Congress =

1993–1997 Term of the National Congress Congreso Nacional

Type
- Type: Bicameral
- Houses: Chamber of Senators, Chamber of Deputies

History
- Preceded by: 1989–93 Congress
- Succeeded by: 1997–2002 Congress

Leadership
- President of the National Congress (ex oficio as Vice President): Víctor Hugo Cárdenas, MRTKL since 6 August 1993
- President of the Senate: Juan Carlos Durán, MNR since August 1993
- Raúl Lema Patiño, MNR since August 1996
- President of the Chamber of Deputies: Guillermo Bedregal Gutiérrez, MNR since August 1993
- Javier Campero Paz, MNR since August 1994
- Guillermo Bedregal Gutiérrez, MNR since August 1995
- Jorge Felix Prestel Kern, MNR since August 1996

Structure
- Seats: 157; 27 Senators; 130 Deputies
- Chamber of Senators political groups: MNR-MRTKL (17): MNR (16); PCB (ML) (1); AP (8): ADN (5); MIR (3); CONDEPA (1) UCS (1)
- Chamber of Deputies political groups: MNR-MRTKL (52): MNR (49); MRTKL (1); MNRI-Siglo XX (1); PDB (1); AP (35): ADN (18); MIR (14); PCB (ML) (2); PDC (1); UCS (20) CONDEPA (13) MBL (7) ARBOL (1) Eje (1) ASD (1)

Elections
- Chamber of Senators voting system: Party-list proportional representation
- Chamber of Deputies voting system: Additional Member System
- Last Chamber of Senators election: 6 June 1993
- Last Chamber of Deputies election: 6 June 1993
- Next Chamber of Senators election: 1 June 1997
- Next Chamber of Deputies election: 1 June 1997

Meeting place
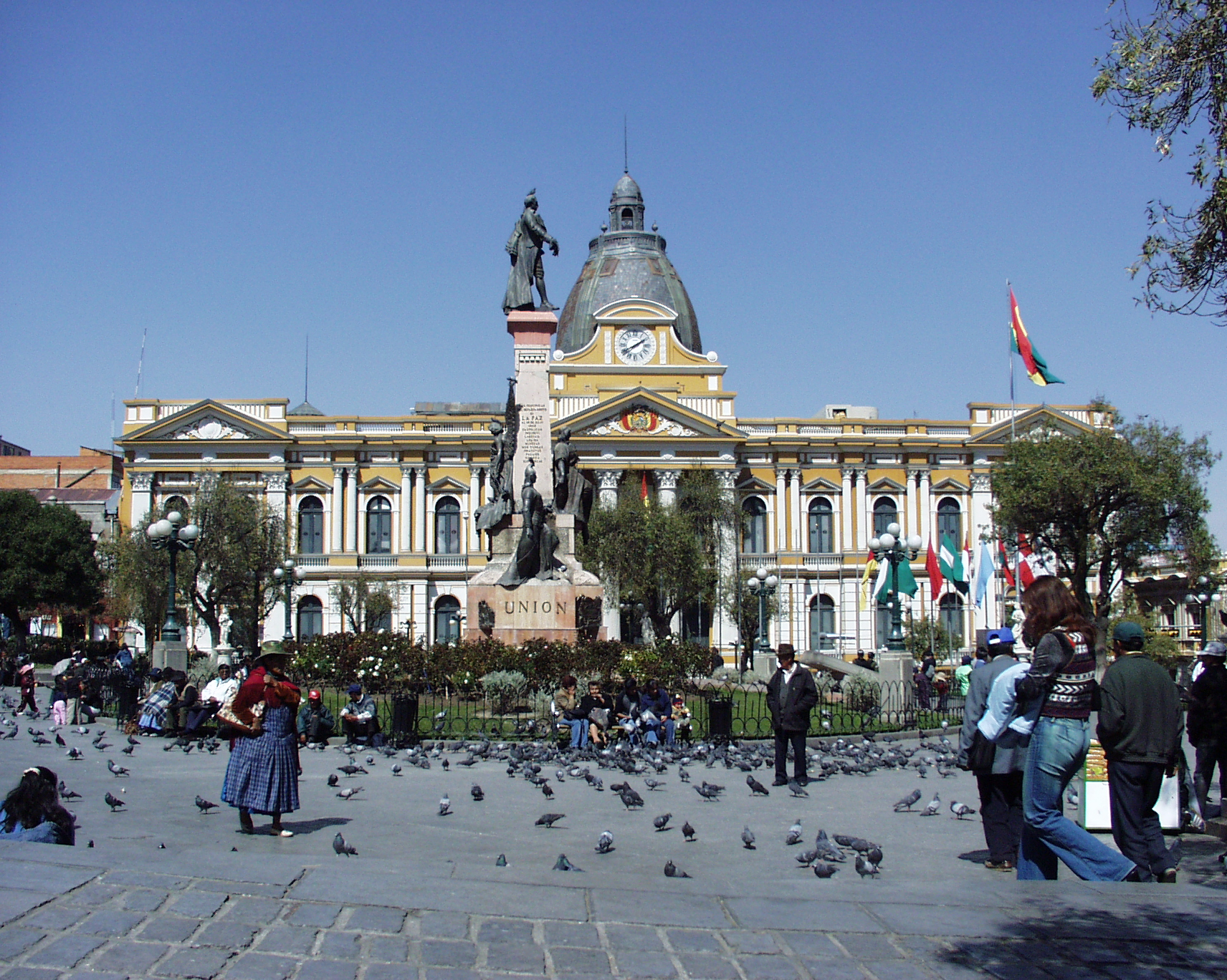
- Palace of Congress

The 1993–1997 Bolivian National Congress was a meeting of the Bolivian legislature composed of the Chamber of Senators and Chamber of Deputies. It met in La Paz from August 1993 to August 1997 during the presidency of Gonzalo Sánchez de Lozada.

The Congress was elected as part of the general elections on 6 June 1993.

== Congressional presidential ballot ==
As no candidate reached the required popular vote majority, the newly elected Congress elected the president on 6 August.

Gonzalo Sánchez de Lozada of the Revolutionary Nationalist Movement (MNR) was the only candidate voted on and was elected with the support of Solidarity Civic Unity (UCS) and the Free Bolivia Movement (MBL). All other parties abstained.

Candidate	Party	Votes	%
Gonzalo Sánchez de Lozada	Revolutionary Nationalist Movement	97	100.00
Total		97	100.00
Total votes		97	–
Registered voters/turnout		157	61.78
Source: Morales

== Leadership ==
=== National Congress ===
- President: Víctor Hugo Cárdenas (MRTKL), from 6 August 1993

=== Chamber of Senators ===
- President: Juan Carlos Durán (MNR), until August 1996
  - Raúl Lema Patiño (MNR), from August 1996

=== Chamber of Deputies ===
- President: Guillermo Bedregal Gutiérrez (MNR), until August 1994
  - Javier Campero Paz (MNR), until August 1995
  - Guillermo Bedregal Gutiérrez (MNR), until August 1996
  - Jorge Felix Prestel Kern (MNR), from August 1996

== Composition ==
=== Chamber of Senators ===
1993–1997 members of the Chamber of Senators:

Senator	Department	Party
Domingo Enrique Ipiña Melgar	Chuquisaca	MNR
Gastón Encinas Valverde	Chuquisaca	MIR
Julio Garrett Ayllón	Chuquisaca	MNR
Andrés Soliz Rada	La Paz	CONDEPA
Guido Rafael Capra Jemio	La Paz	MNR
Javier Tórrez Goitia	La Paz	MNR
Enrique Sánchez de Lozada	Cochabamba	MNR
Benedicto Juvenal Castro	Cochabamba	MNR
Joaquín Aguirre Lavayén	Cochabamba	ADN
Freddy Tejerina Rivera	Oruro	MNR
Jorge Rosso Mendieta	Oruro	UCS
Reynaldo Peters Arzabe	Oruro	MNR
Gonzalo Valda Cárdenas	Potosí	MIR
Valentín Abecia	Potosí	MNR
Wálter Zuleta Roncal	Potosí	MNR
Leopoldo López Cossío	Tarija	MIR
Luis Lema Molina	Tarija	MNR
Raúl Lema Patiño	Tarija	MNR
Jorge Landívar Roca	Santa Cruz	ADN
Juan Carlos Durán	Santa Cruz	MNR
Osvaldo Monasterio Áñez	Santa Cruz	MNR
Guillermo Richter Ascimani	Beni	PCB (ML) (Note: Broke with the alliance between the PCB (ML) and the Patriotic Accord.)
Miguel Majluf Morales	Beni	MNR
Wálter Guiteras Denis	Beni	ADN
Elda Escalante Arzadum	Pando	ADN
Juan Carlos Riss Cecin	Pando	MNR
Leopoldo Fernández	Pando	ADN

=== Chamber of Deputies ===
1993–1997 members of the Chamber of Deputies:

Deputy	Department	Party
Alvaro Vera Corvera	Chuquisaca	ADN
Gastón Moreira Ostria	Chuquisaca	ADN
Jacinto Aramayo Barja	Chuquisaca	MNR
Jaime Ponce Caballero	Chuquisaca	UCS
José Rubén Mogro Zeballos	Chuquisaca	MNR
Enrique Toro Tejada	Chuquisaca	ADN
Luis Morgan López Baspineiro	Chuquisaca	MIR
Maria del Rosario Barriga de Yáñez	Chuquisaca	UCS
Miguel Antoraz Chalup	Chuquisaca	MNR
Miguel Urioste Fernández de Córdova	Chuquisaca	MBL
Omar Montalvo Gallardo	Chuquisaca	MNR
Pastor Velászquez Chaure	Chuquisaca	MBL
Víctor Enrique Urquidi Hodgkinson	Chuquisaca	MNR
Alfredo Romero	La Paz	MNR
Benjamín Miguel Harb	La Paz	PDC
Daniel Santalla	La Paz	CONDEPA
Douglas Ascarrunz Eduardo	La Paz	MNR
Edith Gutiérrez de Mantilla	La Paz	CONDEPA
Eduardo Paz Rada	La Paz	CONDEPA
Emesto Machicao Argiró	La Paz	MNR
Fernando Kieffer Guzmán	La Paz	ADN
Germán Quiroga Gómez	La Paz	MNR
Gonzalo Ruiz Paz	La Paz	CONDEPA
Guido Riveros Franck	La Paz	MIR
Guillermo Bedregal Gutiérrez	La Paz	MNR
Jorge Albarracin	La Paz	CONDEPA
Mauricio González Sfeir	La Paz	MNR
Jorge Medina Pinedo	La Paz	CONDEPA
Juan Antonio Malky Zalaquett	La Paz	UCS
Juan del Granado	La Paz	MBL
Luis Vasquez Villamor	La Paz	MIR
Maria Teresa Paz Prudencio	La Paz	MNR
Michael Meier Finkelstein	La Paz	UCS
Nicomedes Sejas Terrazas	La Paz	MRTKL
Paulino Quispe Tozola	La Paz	MNR
Ramiro Barrenechea Zambrana	La Paz	Eje
Raúl Froilan Tovar Piérola	La Paz	UCS
Remedios Loza	La Paz	CONDEPA
Ricardo Paz Ballivián	La Paz	CONDEPA
Roberto Vega Hermosa	La Paz	CONDEPA
Víctor Choque Loza	La Paz	MNR
Alberto Werner Gasser Vargas	Cochabamba	MNR
Alfonso Ferrufino	Cochabamba	MBL
Armando de la Parra Soria	Cochabamba	PCB (ML)
César Fernando Vargas Mercado	Cochabamba	UCS
Daniel Julio Uriona Suárez	Cochabamba	UCS
Eudoro Galindo	Cochabamba	PDB
Guido Diógenes Camacho Rodríguez	Cochabamba	ADN
Hector Cartagena Chacón	Cochabamba	UCS
José Ramiro Arispe Arispe	Cochabamba	MNR
Laureano Rojas Alcocer	Cochabamba	MNR
Luis Enrique Soria Jáuregui	Cochabamba	MNR
Luis Gonzales Quintanilla	Cochabamba	MIR
Luis Orlando Jordán Balderrama	Cochabamba	MNR
Maria Lourdes Zabala Canedo de Rodríguez	Cochabamba	MNR
Mario Galindo Decker	Cochabamba	UCS
Oliverio Iriarte Lafuente	Cochabamba	MNR
Tito Hoz de Vila	Cochabamba	ADN
Víctor Edgar Cabrera Quezada	Cochabamba	CONDEPA
Carlos Marcelo Fernández Irahola	Oruro	ARBOL
Carlos Raúl Bohrt Irahola	Oruro	MIR
Guillermo Sola Eugenio	Oruro	MNR
Juan Javier Gerardo Tamayo Richard	Oruro	ADN
Juan Martínez Chávez	Oruro	MNR
Lizandro García Arce	Oruro	CONDEPA
Maximo Teran García	Oruro	UCS
Mirtha Patricia Quevedo Acalinovic	Oruro	MNR
Norman Antonio Sahonero Araujo	Oruro	UCS
Walter Sauciri Nunez	Oruro	MNR
Abad Nina Molló	Potosí	MNR
Aida Luz Moreno De Claros	Potosí	MNR
Alejandro Lucio Felipez Bustamante	Potosí	UCS
Angel Rosendo Moscoso Meléndez	Potosí	CONDEPA
Arturo Centellas Miranda	Potosí	MNR
Claudio Miranda Muñoz	Potosí	MNR
Daniel Arturo Oropeza Echevarría	Potosí	ADN
Francisco Checo Condori	Potosí	MBL
Hugo Adolfo Baptista Orgaz	Potosí	UCS
Jebner Zambrana Roman	Potosí	MNR
Juan Manuel Decormis Benavides	Potosí	MNR
Luis Antonio Fernández Fajalde	Potosí	MBL
Luis Sanabria Taboada	Potosí	UCS
Nestor Zamora Muñoz	Potosí	ADN
Ruggero Seborga Prieto	Potosí	UCS
Sergio Medinacelli Soza	Potosí	MIR
Walter Villagra Romay	Potosí	PCB (ML)
Wilson Antonio Lora Espada	Potosí	ADN
Yerko Andrés Kukoc del Carpio	Potosí	MNR
Claudio Salinas Martínez	Tarija	MNR
Enrique Zelaya Ayllon	Tarija	MNR
Hugo Carvajal Donoso	Tarija	MIR
Imel Copa Velasquez	Tarija	MNR
Javier Campero Paz	Tarija	MNR
Jorge Gonzalo Barrientos de Ugarte	Tarija	UCS
Mario Arce Tórrez	Tarija	ADN
Martha Linares de Olivera	Tarija	MNR
Rafael Canedo Trigo	Tarija	ADN
Adela del Rosario Prado de Barbonari	Santa Cruz	MNR
Edil Sandoval Morón	Santa Cruz	MNRI-Siglo XX
Erwin Saucedo Fuentes	Santa Cruz	MBL
Fernando Bowles Rizzo	Santa Cruz	UCS
Guido Nayar	Santa Cruz	ADN
Guillermo Capobianco Rivera	Santa Cruz	MIR
Hormando Vaca Díez	Santa Cruz	MIR
Ismael Morón Sánchez	Santa Cruz	MNR
Jerjes Justiniano Talavera	Santa Cruz	ASD
Jorge Felix Prestel Kern	Santa Cruz	MNR
Justo Yepez Kakuda	Santa Cruz	CONDEPA
Luis Osman Landívar Bowles	Santa Cruz	UCS
Mario Rueda Peña	Santa Cruz	MIR
Neisa Roca Hurtado	Santa Cruz	ADN
Pedro Luis García Capriles	Santa Cruz	MNR
Ronald Nieme Méndez	Santa Cruz	MNR
Silvio Aramayo Cruz	Santa Cruz	MNR
Antonio Majluf Morales	Beni	MNR
Carlos Suárez Mendoza	Beni	MNR
Elena Velasco de Urresti	Beni	ADN
Elias Asbún Tobías	Beni	MNR
Hugo Yabert Lozano	Beni	MIR
Jorge Kohler Salas	Beni	MIR
Luis Enrique Monasterio Chávez	Beni	UCS
Luis Zambrano Ibáñez	Beni	MNR
Simón Guido Roca Villavicencio	Beni	ADN
Adolfo Áñez Ferreira	Pando	ADN
David Bautista Sánchez	Pando	ADN
Emigdio Flores Calpiñeiro	Pando	MIR
Felipe Bigabriel Villarreal	Pando	MNR
José Luis Padilla Mejido	Pando	MIR
Napoleón Landívar Ruiz	Pando	UCS
Ruth Becerra Villalobos de Leverenz	Pando	MNR
