= 1989–1993 Bolivian National Congress =

1989–1993 Term of the National Congress Congreso Nacional

Type
- Type: Bicameral
- Houses: Chamber of Senators, Chamber of Deputies

History
- Preceded by: 1985–89 Congress
- Succeeded by: 1993–97 Congress

Leadership
- President of the National Congress (ex oficio as Vice President): Luis Ossio, PDC since 6 August 1989
- President of the Senate: Gonzalo Valda Cárdenas, MIR since 6 August 1989
- Guillermo Fortún Suárez, ADN since 6 August 1991
- President of the Chamber of Deputies: Fernando Kieffer Guzmán, ADN since 6 August 1989
- Gastón Encinas Valverde, MIR since 6 August 1991

Structure
- Seats: 157; 27 Senators; 130 Deputies
- Chamber of Senators political groups: MNR (9): MNR (7); PS-Aponte (1); PDB (1); MIR (8): MIR (7); PCB (ML) (1); ADN-PDC (8): ADN (7); PDC (1); CONDEPA (2)
- Chamber of Deputies political groups: MNR (40): MNR (32); MNRI-Siglo XX (4); PCB (ML) (2); PDB (2); AP (38): ADN (34); PDC (4); MIR (33): MIR (29); MNR-V (2); PCB (ML) (2); IU (10): MIR-BL (5); PS-1 (2); PCB (1); POR-U (1); Ind. (1); CONDEPA (9)

Elections
- Chamber of Senators voting system: Party-list proportional representation
- Chamber of Deputies voting system: Additional Member System
- Last Chamber of Senators election: 7 May 1989
- Last Chamber of Deputies election: 7 May 1989
- Next Chamber of Senators election: 6 June 1993
- Next Chamber of Deputies election: 6 June 1993

Meeting place
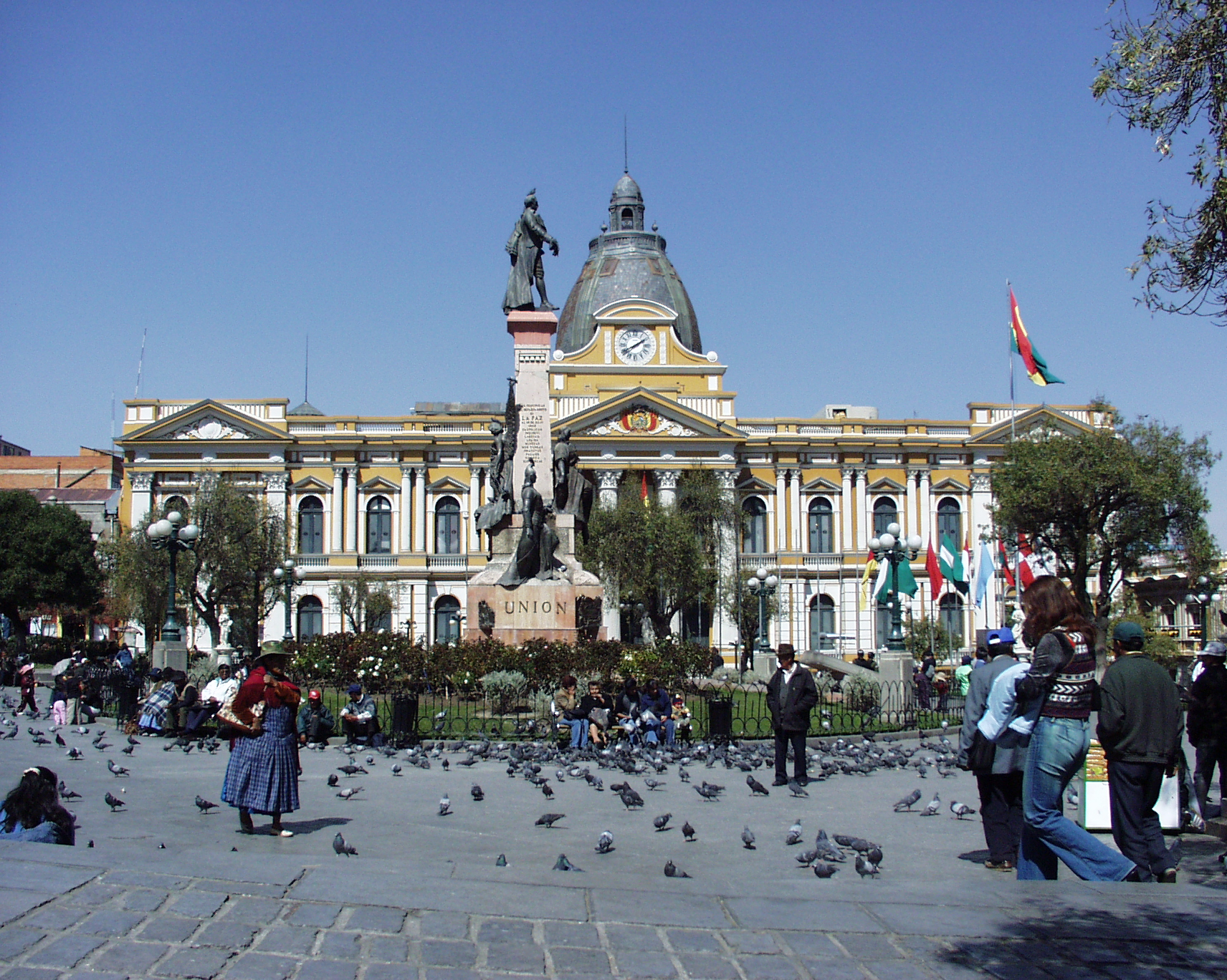
- Palace of Congress

The 1989–1993 Bolivian National Congress was a meeting of the Bolivian legislature composed of the Chamber of Senators and Chamber of Deputies. It met in La Paz from 6 August 1989 to 6 August 1993 during the presidency of Jaime Paz Zamora.

The Congress was elected as part of the general elections on 7 May 1989.

== Congressional presidential ballot ==
As no candidate reached the required popular vote majority, the newly elected Congress elected the president on 6 August.

Jaime Paz Zamora of the Revolutionary Left Movement (MIR) was elected with the support of the Nationalist Democratic Action (ADN) and Conscience of Fatherland (CONDEPA). Gonzalo Sánchez de Lozada of the Revolutionary Nationalist Movement (MNR) received only the support of his own party. The United Left (IU) abstained. In exchange for the support of the ADN, the MIR agreed to elect Luis Ossio of the Christian Democratic Party (PDC) as vice president rather than Paz Zamora's running mate Gustavo Fernández Saavedra.

Candidate	Party	Votes	%
Jaime Paz Zamora	Revolutionary Left Movement	97	65.99
Gonzalo Sánchez de Lozada	Revolutionary Nationalist Movement	50	34.01
Total		147	100.00
Total votes		147	–
Registered voters/turnout		157	93.63
Source: Morales

== Leadership ==
=== National Congress ===
- President: Luis Ossio (PDC), from 6 August 1989

=== Chamber of Senators ===
- President: Gonzalo Valda Cárdenas (MIR), until 6 August 1991
  - Guillermo Fortún Suárez (ADN), from 6 August 1991

=== Chamber of Deputies ===
- President: Fernando Kieffer Guzmán (ADN), until 6 August 1991
  - Gastón Encinas Valverde (MIR), from 6 August 1991

== Composition ==
=== Chamber of Senators ===
1989–1993 members of the Chamber of Senators:

Senator	Department	Party
Daniel Cabezas Gómez	Chuquisaca	MIR
Gómez José Luis Carvajal	Chuquisaca	MIR
Willy Vargas Vacaflor	Chuquisaca	ADN
Guillermo Fortún Suárez	La Paz	ADN
Jorge Escobari Cusicanqui	La Paz	CONDEPA
José Taboada Calderón de la Barca	La Paz	CONDEPA
Eudoro Galindo	Cochabamba	PDB
Germán Lema Aráoz	Cochabamba	MNR
Lidia Gueiler Tejada	Cochabamba	MIR
Jorge Barrientos Zapata	Oruro	MIR
Jorge Inchauste Zelaya	Oruro	MIR
Juan Luzio Grandchant	Oruro	ADN
Elena Calderón de Zuleta	Potosí	MIR
Gonzalo Valda Cárdenas	Potosí	MIR
Jaime Villegas Duran	Potosí	MNR
Mario Cossío Sejas	Tarija	MNR
Óscar Zamora Medinaceli	Tarija	PCB (ML) (Note: Allied with the MIR)
Raúl Lema Patiño	Tarija	MNR
Enrique Quintela Vaca Díez	Santa Cruz	MNR
Jorge Landívar Roca	Santa Cruz	ADN
Juan Carlos Durán	Santa Cruz	MNR
Carlos Farah Aquin	Beni	ADN
Guillermo Aponte Burela	Beni	PS-Aponte
Hans Dellien Salazar	Beni	PDC
Eugenio Von Beck Parada	Pando	ADN
Leopoldo Fernández	Pando	ADN
Ñuflo Chávez Ortiz	Pando	MNR

=== Chamber of Deputies ===
1989–1993 members of the Chamber of Deputies:

Deputy	Department	Party
Enrique Toro Tejada	Chuquisaca	ADN
Gastón Moreira Ostria	Chuquisaca	ADN
Jorge Landívar Rua	Chuquisaca	ADN
Miguel Urioste Fernández de Córdova	Chuquisaca	MIR-BL
Julio Arias Soto	Chuquisaca	MIR-BL
Antonio Germán Gutiérrez Gantier	Chuquisaca	PS-1
Gastón Encinas Valverde	Chuquisaca	MIR
Francisco Javier Santiago Arana Bustillos	Chuquisaca	MIR
Juan José Padilla Nava	Chuquisaca	MIR
Luis Morgan López Baspineiro	Chuquisaca	MIR
Antonio Hassenteufel Salazar	Chuquisaca	MNR
Ciro Humboldt	Chuquisaca	MNR
Joaquín Argandoña Ortega	Chuquisaca	MNR
Antonio Ormachea Méndez	La Paz	ADN
Carolina Toledo Canedo	La Paz	ADN
Fernando Kieffer Guzmán	La Paz	ADN
Jorge Monje Zapata	La Paz	ADN
Raúl Boada Rodríguez	La Paz	ADN
Roberto Vega Hermosa	La Paz	ADN
Benjamín Miguel Harb	La Paz	PDC
Remedios Loza	La Paz	CONDEPA
Andrés Soliz Rada	La Paz	CONDEPA
Juan Jorge Medina Pineda	La Paz	CONDEPA
Juan Cleto Tórrez Chuquimia	La Paz	CONDEPA
Gonzalo Bilbao la Vieja	La Paz	CONDEPA
Julio Mantilla Cuéllar	La Paz	CONDEPA
Gonzalo Ruiz Paz	La Paz	CONDEPA
Carlos Eduardo García Suárez	La Paz	CONDEPA
Pastor Manzano Arce	La Paz	CONDEPA
Ramiro Velasco Romero	La Paz	PS-1
Emma Obleas Vda de Tórrez	La Paz	MIR
Gonzalo Quiroga Zubieta	La Paz	MNR
Guido Riveros Franck	La Paz	MIR
Luis Angel Vásquez Villamor	La Paz	MIR
Marco Antonio Oviedo Huerta	La Paz	MIR
Douglas Ascarrunz Eduardo	La Paz	MNR
Emilio López Arteaga	La Paz	MNR
María Teresa Paz Prudencio	La Paz	MNR
Edwin Rodríguez Aguirre	La Paz	MNR
Guillermo Bedregal Gutiérrez	La Paz	MNR
Carlos Pérez Guzmán	La Paz	MNRI-Siglo XX
Guido Camacho Rodríguez	Cochabamba	ADN
Tito Hoz de Vila	Cochabamba	ADN
Walter Soriano Lea Plaza	Cochabamba	ADN
Willy Céspedes Olmos	Cochabamba	ADN
Jorge Agreda Valderrama	Cochabamba	PDC
Rafael Puente Calvo	Cochabamba	Independent
Alfonso Ferrufino	Cochabamba	MIR-BL
Remberto Montenegro Ortiz	Cochabamba	MIR-BL
Gonzalo Mercado Gumucio	Cochabamba	MIR
Luis Gonzales Quintanilla	Cochabamba	MIR
René Recacochea Salinas	Cochabamba	MIR
Armando de la Parra Soria	Cochabamba	PCB (ML) (Note: Allied with the MIR)
Juan Pereira Fiorilo	Cochabamba	MNR-V
Carlos Bustos Larrabure	Cochabamba	MNR
Edgar Sandoval Daza	Cochabamba	MNR
Germán Quiroga Gómez	Cochabamba	MNR
Julio Valenzuela Gonzáles	Cochabamba	MNR
Franklin Anaya Vásquez	Cochabamba	MNRI-Siglo XX
Raúl Vargas Altamirano	Oruro	ADN
Reynaldo Vásquez Sempértegui	Oruro	ADN
Walter Alarcón Rojas	Oruro	ADN
Carlos Raúl Borth Irahola	Oruro	MIR
Heriberto Mamani Apaza	Oruro	MIR
Ramiro Argandoña Valdez	Oruro	MIR
Severino Jaita Oyola	Oruro	MNR-V
Reynaldo Peters Arzabe	Oruro	MNR
Genaro Frontanilla Vistas	Oruro	MNR
Agustín Ameller Gatica	Oruro	PCB (ML) (Note: Allied with the MNR)
Antonio Pardo Guevara	Potosí	ADN
Edgar Barrientos Cazazola	Potosí	ADN
Lino Pérez Estrada	Potosí	ADN
Wilson Antonio Lora Espana	Potosí	ADN
Humberto Zambrana Zenteno	Potosí	PDC
Luis Antonio Fernández Fagalde	Potosí	MIR-BL
Simón Reyes	Potosí	PCB
Filemón Escóbar	Potosí	POR-U
Alfredo Soraide Vargas	Potosí	MIR
Edgar Lazo Loayza	Potosí	MIR
Jebner Zambrana Roman	Potosí	MIR
José Ernesto Tórrez Obleas	Potosí	MIR
Sergio Medinacelli Soza	Potosí	MIR
Walter Villagra Romay	Potosí	PCB (ML) (Note: Allied with the MIR)
Guillermo Condori Ramos	Potosí	MNR
Johny Prada Uribe	Potosí	MNR
Martín Quiroz Alcala	Potosí	MNR
Raúl Gallo Ibáñez	Potosí	MNR
Oscar Bonifaz Gutiérrez	Potosí	MNR
Mario Arce Torres	Tarija	ADN
Emma Navajas De Alandia	Tarija	PDC
Arturo Liebers Valdivieso	Tarija	MIR
Hugo Carvajal Donoso	Tarija	MIR
Leopoldo López Cossío	Tarija	MIR
Elio Vaca Villarroel	Tarija	MNR
Luis Lema Molina	Tarija	MNR
Javier Campero Paz	Tarija	MNR
Manuel Paz Soruco	Tarija	MNR
Carlos Caher Harb	Santa Cruz	ADN
Hedim Céspedes Cossío	Santa Cruz	ADN
Luz Pilar Barrancos de Castro	Santa Cruz	ADN
Neisa Roca Hurtado	Santa Cruz	ADN
Sixto Nelson Fleig Saucedo	Santa Cruz	ADN
William Benjamín Vaca Moreno	Santa Cruz	ADN
Carlos Dabdoub Arrien	Santa Cruz	MIR
Hormando Vaca Diez	Santa Cruz	MIR
Mario Rueda Peña	Santa Cruz	MIR
Rolando Aróstegui Quiroga	Santa Cruz	MIR
Clovis Rodríguez Ramírez	Santa Cruz	MNR
Olga Banegas de Flores	Santa Cruz	MNR
Ronald Nieme Méndez	Santa Cruz	MNR
Hugo Velasco Rosales	Santa Cruz	MNR
Joaquín Monasterios Pinkert	Santa Cruz	MNRI-Siglo XX
Edil Sandoval Morón	Santa Cruz	MNRI-Siglo XX
Alfredo Cuéllar Vargas	Santa Cruz	PDB
Elena Velasco de Urresti	Beni	ADN
Fernando Iriarte Suárez	Beni	ADN
Manlio Roca Melgar	Beni	ADN
Walter Guiteras Denis	Beni	ADN
Jorge Kholer Salas	Beni	MIR
José Hashimoto Pinto	Beni	MNR
Miguel Majluf Morales	Beni	MNR
Guillermo Richter Ascimani	Beni	PCB (ML) (Note: Allied with the MNR)
Alex Arteaga Chávez	Beni	PDB
David Baustista Sánchez	Pando	ADN
Elda Escalante Arzadum	Pando	ADN
Miguel Becerra Suárez	Pando	ADN
Emigdio Flores Calpiñeiro	Pando	MIR
Ernesto Machicado Algiro	Pando	MNR
Iran Arab Fadul	Pando	MNR
Fernando Barthelemy Martínez	Pando	MNR
