= Moisés Torres (politician) =

Bolivian politician (1949–2021)

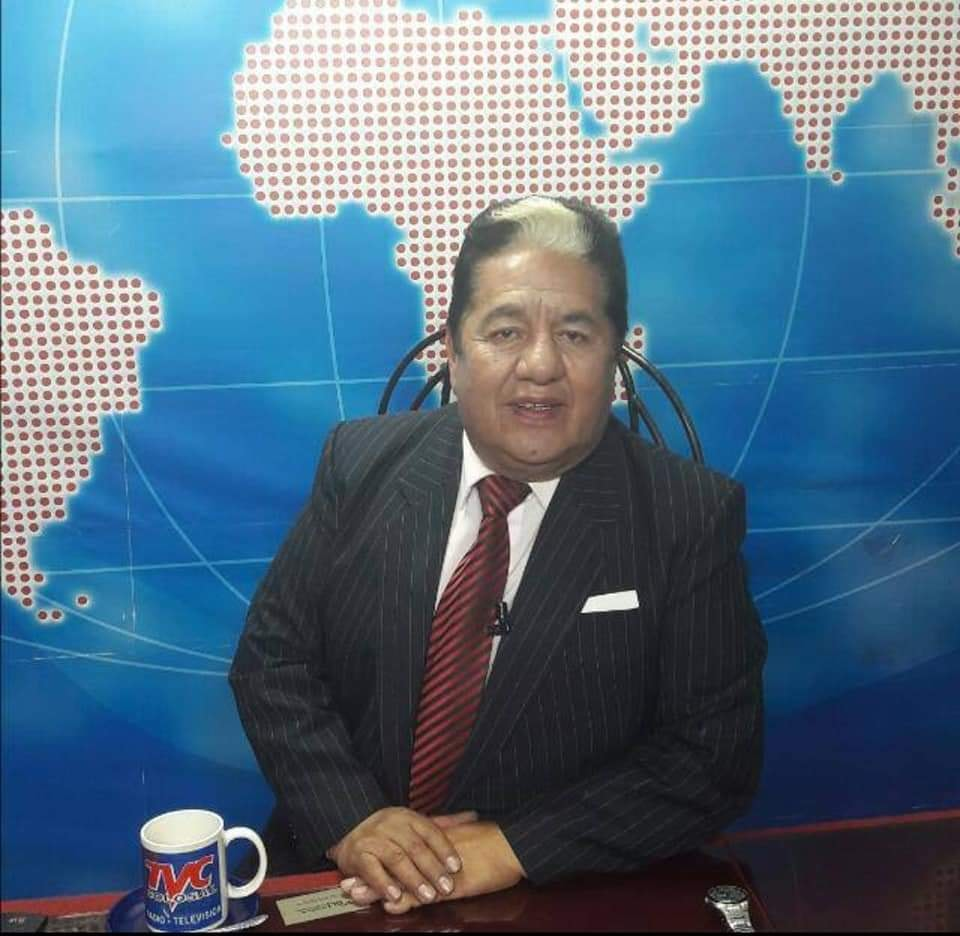

Member of the Chamber of Deputies of Bolivia
- In office 6 August 1997 – 6 August 2002
- Constituency: Chuquisaca Department

Personal details
- Born: 1949 Sucre, Bolivia
- Died: 4 August 2021 (aged 71–72) Sucre, Bolivia
- Party: CONDEPA

Moisés Torres (1949 – 4 August 2021) was a Bolivian politician, journalist, and professor. A member of the party Conscience of Fatherland, he represented the Chuquisaca Department in the Chamber of Deputies from 1997 to 2002.

== Early life and education ==
Torres was born in Sucre in 1949. He graduated from secondary school in 1967 and attended the Escuela Superior de Formación de Maestros Mariscal Sucre, from where he graduated with a degree in teaching in 1978. He also worked as a journalist and became the owner of "Radio Colosal", which he founded in 1983. He also became the owner of Radio Televisión Popular.

== Political career ==
Torres entered politics in 1995, after he was invited to join Conscience of Fatherland (CONSEPA) by Carlos Palenque. He ran for Mayor of Sucre in 1996 but was unsuccessful, finishing sixth in the final vote tally, although he won a seat on the city council. He resigned from this position in 1997 to run for a seat in the Chamber of Deputies. He was elected, representing the Chuquisaca Department, although he was the only member of CONSEPA to win a parliamentary seat in the department. He ran for re-election in 2002, but was unsuccessful due to fragmentation within CONSEPA. He returned to journalism following this defeat.

After an eight-year retirement, Torres returned to politics in 2010 to run for Mayor of Sucre for the second time. This time, he represented the citizen group Frente Para la Victoria (FPV), although he was again unsuccessful and only earned 3.7% of the vote. He subsequently retired from politics for the final time.

== Death ==
Moisés Torres died of complications from COVID-19 in Sucre on 4 August 2021, at the age of 72.
