= 1989 Bolivian general election =

- Registered: 2,137,285
- Turnout: 73.64% (▼8.33pp)
- Presidential election
- 7 May 1989 (popular vote) 6 August 1989 (Congress vote)

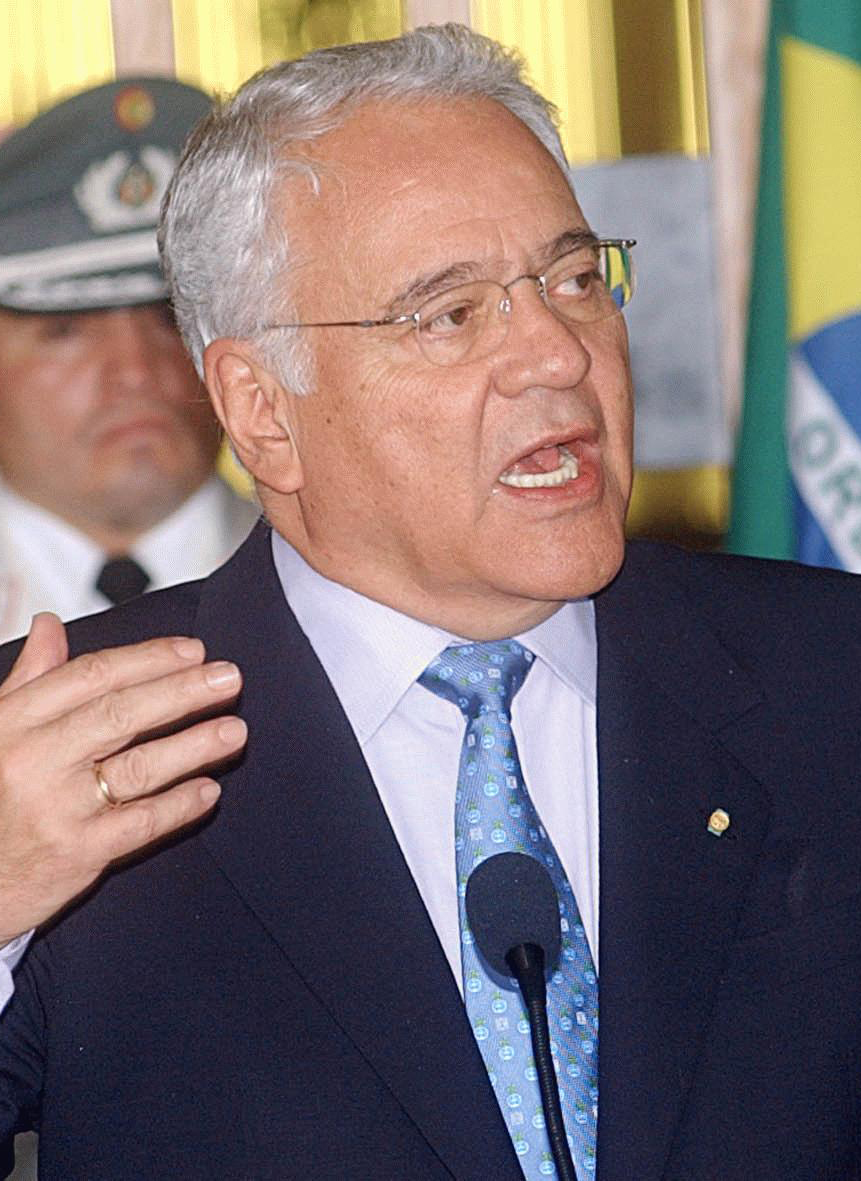

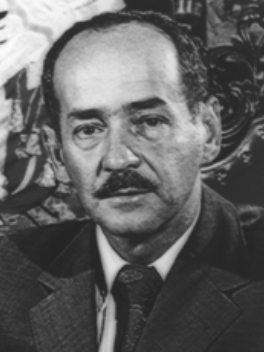

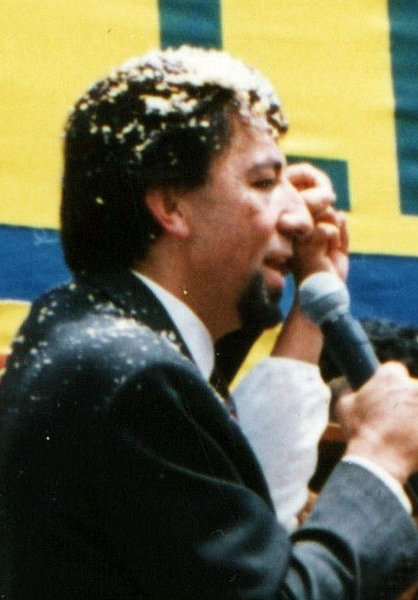
Nominee	Jaime Paz Zamora	Gonzalo Sánchez de Lozada	Hugo Banzer
Party	MIR	MNR	ADN
Running mate	Gustavo Fernández Saavedra	Wálter Guevara	Luis Ossio
Electoral vote	97	50
Popular vote	309,033	363,113	357,298
Percentage	21.83%	25.65%	25.24%
Nominee	Carlos Palenque	Antonio Araníbar Quiroga
Party	CONDEPA	IU
Running mate	Jorge Escobari Cusicanqui	Wálter Delgadillo Terceros
Popular vote	173,459	113,509
Percentage	12.25%	8.02%
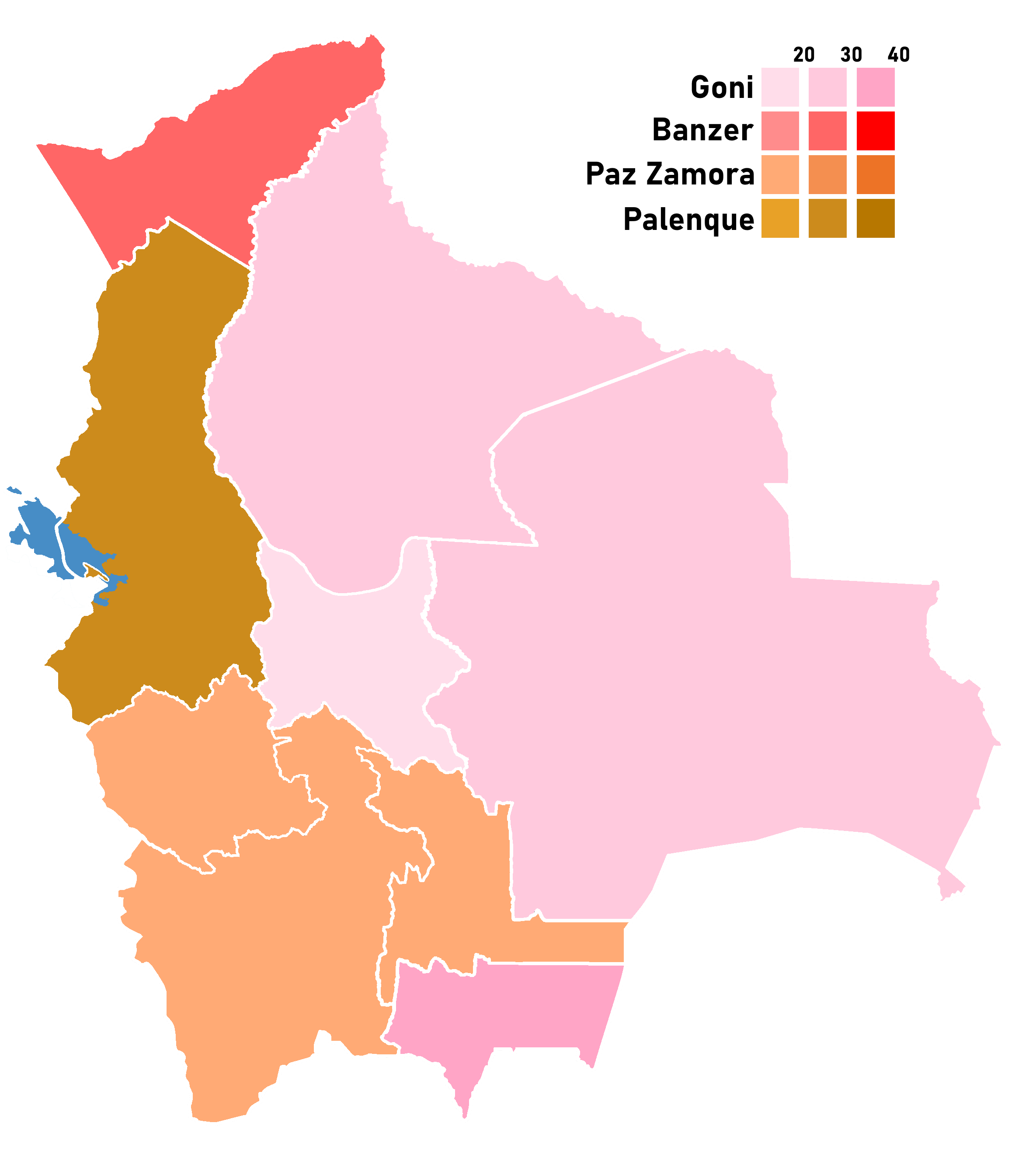
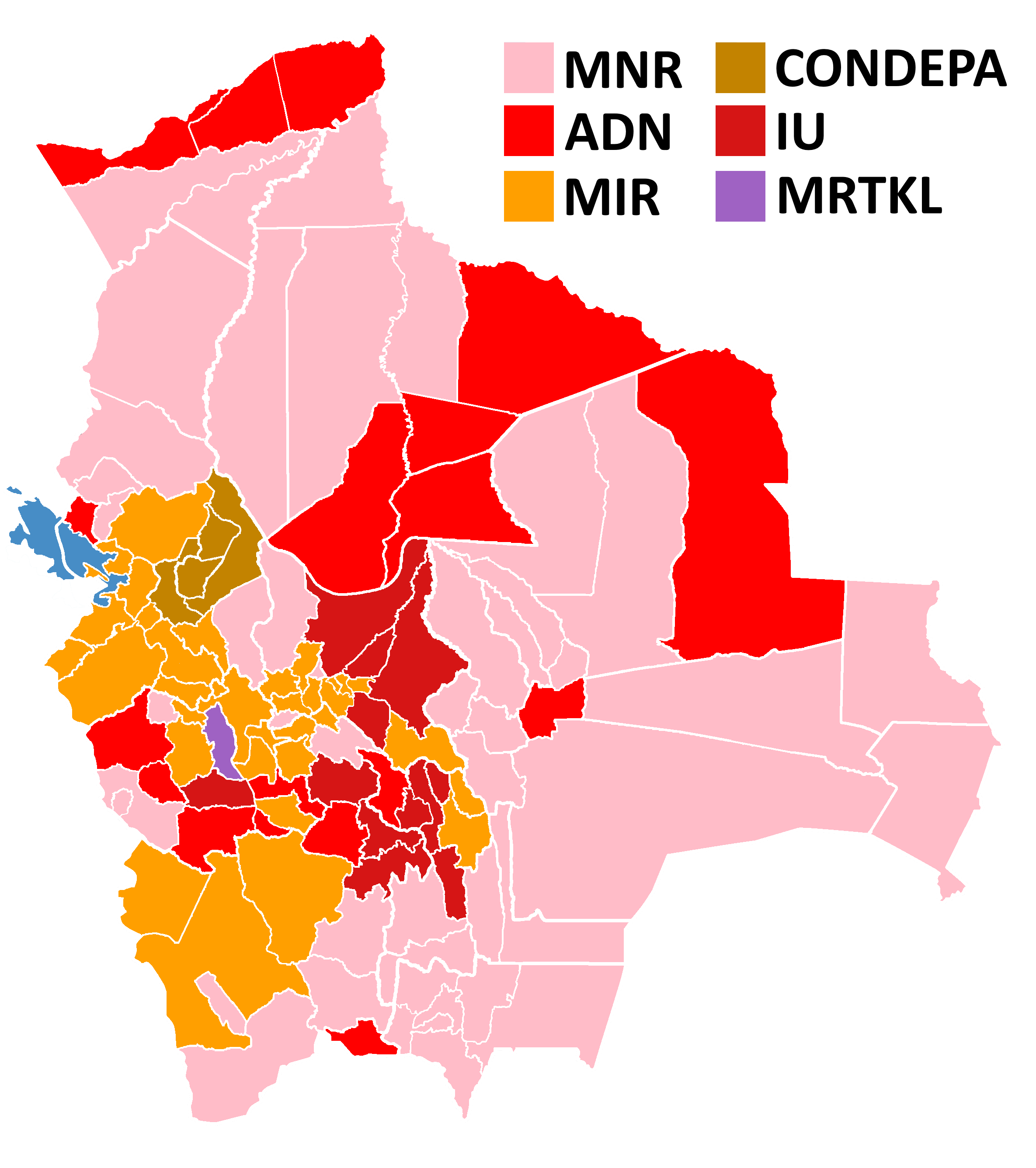
President before election
Víctor Paz Estenssoro
MNR
Elected President
Jaime Paz Zamora
MIR

General elections were held in Bolivia on 7 May 1989. As no candidate for the presidency received over 50% of the vote, the National Congress was required to elect a president on 6 August. Although the Revolutionary Nationalist Movement had received the most votes, its candidate for President Gonzalo Sánchez de Lozada was defeated by Jaime Paz Zamora of the Revolutionary Left Movement (MIR) in the congressional vote, despite the MIR only finishing third in the public vote.

== Campaign ==
In the initial months of 1989, the Revolutionary Nationalist Movement (MNR) tried in vain to postpone the election date, arguing that the deadline for electoral registration restricted citizen participation. In December 1988, the party's delegation in Congress had managed to amend the electoral law of 1986. Arguing that the new registration requirements, which limited registration to citizens who possessed cédulas de identidad (national identity cards), constituted a violation of universal suffrage, the MNR pushed through legislation that added birth certificates and military service cards as valid registration documents. Nationalist Democratic Action (ADN) refused to go along with its ally and eventually charged the MNR with conducting fraudulent registrations. By mid-February this issue had triggered the rupture of the pacto.

The end of the pacto revealed an old reality about Bolivian politics. To achieve power, broad electoral alliances must be established; yet, electoral alliances have never translated into stable or effective ruling coalitions. On the contrary, electoral alliances have exacerbated the tensions built into a complex system. Thus, once in power, whoever controls the executive must search for mechanisms or coalitions such as the pacto to be able to govern. This search was the single most important challenge facing Bolivian politicians into the 1980s.

As expected, every political party was forced to scramble for new allies. The ADN joined forces with the now minuscule Christian Democrats by naming Luis Ossio as Banzer's running mate in an effort to attract other political elements. Banzer led every major poll, and the ADN repeatedly called for Congress to respect the first majority to emerge from the May 7 election.

The situation was more complex in the MNR where, after a bitter internal struggle, Gonzalo Sánchez de Lozada, a pragmatic former Minister of Planning and Coordination and prominent entrepreneur, captured the party's nomination. The MNR's strategy was to develop Sánchez de Lozada's image as a veteran movimientista (movement leader) to capture populist support. At the same time, party strategists intended to attract support from outside the party by building on the candidate's entrepreneurial background. The task of converting the candidate into an old party member apparently succeeded: old-line populist politicians dominated the first slots on the party's legislative lists. The naming of former president Walter Guevara Arze as the vice presidential candidate was perceived as further evidence of the party's success in influencing the candidate.

Following a similar electoral logic, the MIR sought to broaden its base of support by establishing ties with several parties, including Carlos Serrate Reich's 9 April Revolutionary Vanguard, the Revolutionary Front of the Left, and a number of dissidents from the MNRI. Paz Zamora, the MIR's candidate, led in some polls, and most analysts agreed that he would pose a significant threat to the MNR and ADN.

The left attempted a comeback following the disastrous experience of the UDP years. Headed by Antonio Aranibar's Free Bolivia Movement, the left grouped into a broad front labelled the United Left (IU). The IU brought together splinter factions of the MIR, the Socialist Party-1, and the Communist Party, and it counted on the support of organized labor, especially the COB. Given the historical divisions within the Bolivian left, however, the IU was not perceived to be a serious contender. If it could maintain unity beyond the 1989 elections, observers believed that its impact might be greater than anticipated.

The main newcomer to national electoral politics, although no stranger to La Paz politics, was Carlos Palenque. Popularly known as El Compadre ("the comrade"), Palenque was a former folksinger turned radio and television owner and talk show host. His "popular" style of broadcasting had always enjoyed widespread appeal in the working-class and marginal neighborhoods surrounding La Paz. For at least a decade, Palenque had been regarded as a possible candidate for mayor of La Paz; during the 1987 municipal elections, his name was under consideration by the MNR.

Palenque's move into national politics was prompted by the closing down of his television station for airing accusations made by an infamous drug trafficker, Roberto Suárez Gómez, against the Bolivian government. To promote his candidacy, Palenque founded Conscience of the Fatherland (Conciencia de Patria—Condepa, a name taken from the Reason for Fatherland—Radepa military society that formed the 1943–1944 Bolivian government junta), which grouped together a bizarre strain of disaffected leftists, populists, and nationalists who had defected from several other parties.

Ten parties and fronts contested the election, which was held as scheduled on May 7, 1989. The results, a virtual three-way tie among the MNR, ADN, and MIR, were not surprising. As expected, Congress once again was given the task of electing the next president from the top three contenders. But the slight majority (a mere 5,815 votes) obtained by the MNR's candidate, Sánchez de Lozada, was surprising to observers, as was the unexpected victory by Palenque in La Paz Department. His showing was significant in a number of ways. First, it demonstrated that none of the major political parties had been able to attract lower middle-class and proletarian urban groups, who had flocked to El Compadre; Palenque had wisely targeted marginal and displaced sectors of La Paz. Second, Condepa's showing reflected the growth of racial and ethnic tension in Bolivian electoral politics. For the first time in the history of the Bolivian Congress, for example, a Chola (an indigenous woman who moved to the city and dressed in urban garb) would serve as a deputy for La Paz Department.

Claims of fraud from every contender, especially in the recounting of the votes, clouded the legitimacy of the process. At one stage, fearing an agreement between the ADN and MIR, the MNR called for the annulment of the elections. Indeed, negotiations were well advanced between the MIR and ADN to upstage the relative victory obtained by the MNR. Between May and early August, the top three finishers bargained and manipulated in an attempt to secure control of the executive branch.

The composition of Congress exacerbated the tensions between the parties in contention. Because seventy-nine seats are needed to elect a president, compromise was indispensable. In mid-1989, however, it was unclear whether the political system in Bolivia had matured enough to allow for compromise.

== Results ==
Party	Presidential candidate	Votes	%	Seats			
Party	Presidential candidate	Votes	%	Chamber	+/–	Senate	+/–
Revolutionary Nationalist Movement	Gonzalo Sánchez de Lozada	363,113	25.65	40	–3	9	–7
Nationalist Democratic Action	Hugo Banzer	357,298	25.24	38	–3	8	–2
Revolutionary Left Movement	Jaime Paz Zamora	309,033	21.83	33	+18	8	+7
Conscience of Fatherland	Carlos Palenque	173,459	12.25	9	New	2	New
United Left	Antonio Aranibar Quiroga	113,509	8.02	10	–	0	–
Socialist Party – 1	Roger Cortéz Hurtado	39,763	2.81	0	–5	0	0
Túpac Katari Revolutionary Liberation Movement	Víctor Hugo Cárdenas	22,983	1.62	0	–2	0	0
Katarist United Liberation Front	Jenaro Flores Santos	16,416	1.16	0	New	0	New
Bolivian Socialist Falange	–	10,608	0.75	0	–3	0	0
National Left Movement	Luis Sandoval Morón	9,687	0.68	0	New	0	New
Total		1,415,869	100.00	130	0	27	0
Valid votes		1,415,869	89.97				
Invalid/blank votes		157,921	10.03				
Total votes		1,573,790	100.00				
Registered voters/turnout		2,137,285	73.64				
Source: Nohlen

=== By department ===
Department	ADN	MNR	MIR	CONDEPA	Others
Beni	38.00%	35.76%	15.24%	1.32%	9.68%
Chuquisaca	23.00%	21.86%	25.45%	0.90%	28.78%
Cochabamba	25.45%	26.16%	25.45%	2.49%	20.45%
La Paz	20.91%	18.80%	17.46%	30.08%	12.75%
Oruro	25.46%	25.42%	29.39%	2.92%	16.81%
Pando	38.62%	37.10%	15.19%	0.81%	8.28%
Potosi	23.11%	24.43%	26.22%	1.72%	24.52%
Santa Cruz	33.44%	35.02%	22.43%	0.97%	8.13%
Tarija	23.85%	41.12%	23.97%	0.81%	10.26%
Source: Constituency-Level Election Archive

=== Congressional ballot ===
MIR's Paz Zamora was supported by Nationalist Democratic Action and Conscience of Fatherland, whilst the MNR's Sánchez was not supported by any other party. The United Left abstained from the vote. For the support of the ADN, the MIR chose to elect Hugo Banzer's running mate Luis Ossio (PDC) as vice president rather than Gustavo Fernández Saavedra, Paz Zamora's running mate.

Candidate	Party	Votes	%
Jaime Paz Zamora	Revolutionary Left Movement	97	65.99
Gonzalo Sánchez de Lozada	Revolutionary Nationalist Movement	50	34.01
Total		147	100.00
Total votes		147	–
Registered voters/turnout		157	93.63
Source: Morales

== See also ==
- Bolivian National Congress, 1989–1993

== Bibliography ==
- G, Carlos D. Mesa (2003). Presidentes de Bolivia: entre urnas y fusiles : el poder ejecutivo, los ministros de estado (in Spanish). Editorial Gisbert.
