= Vaca (surname) =

- Language: Spanish

Origin
- Meaning: "Cow"
- Region of origin: Bolivia, Ecuador, Mexico, Argentina

Other names
- Variant forms: Baca, Vacas, de Vaca

Vaca is a Spanish language surname, literally meaning "cow". The surname originated in Valderas, León in Spain. It may refer to:

== People ==
- Claudia Vaca (born 1984), Bolivian poet and essayist
- Cristóbal Vaca de Castro (1492–1566), Spanish colonial administrator
- Daniel Vaca (born 1978), Bolivian footballer
- Danny Vaca (born 1990), Ecuadorian footballer
- Doyle Vaca (born 1979), Bolivian footballer
- Edder Vaca (born 1985), Ecuadorian footballer
- Eduardo Vaca (1944–1998), Argentine politician
- Emmanuel García Vaca (born 1989), Mexican footballer
- Ervin Vaca (born 2004), Bolivian footballer
- Farides Vaca (born 1969), Bolivian politician
- Francisco Vaca (born 1951), Bolivian politician
- Henry Vaca (born 1998), Bolivian footballer
- Hormando Vaca Díez (1949–2010), Bolivian politician
- Getulio Vaca (born 1984), Bolivian footballer
- Joaquín Botero Vaca (born 1977), Bolivian footballer
- Jorge Vaca (born 1959), Mexican boxer
- José María Vaca de Guzmán (1744–1816), Spanish statesman and poet
- Joselito Vaca (born 1984), Bolivian footballer
- Jusepa Vaca (1589-1653), Spanish actress
- Karel Vaca (1919–1989), Czech artist
- Laura Vaca (born 1953), Bolivian swimmer
- Leonardo Vaca (born 1995), Bolivian footballer
- Nina Vaca, Ecuadorian–American entrepreneur
- Pedro Vaca, (born 1961), Bolivian cyclist
- Ramiro Vaca (born 1999), Bolivian footballer
- Rafael Vaca (born 1934), Mexican cyclist
- Sabino Vaca Narvaja (born 1975), Argentine politician
- Václav Vaca (born 1948), Czech artist
