= Facundo Hurtado Castellón =

Bolivian politician (born 1950)

Facundo Hurtado Castellón (born November 27, 1950, Oruro) is a Bolivian politician and journalist. Hurtado Castellón represented the journalists at the newspaper El Diario in the La Paz Press Workers Trade Union (STPLP) and was the STPLP delegate to the Press Workers Federation of Bolivia (FTPB). As of 2002, he served as a member of the editorial board of the newspaper El Patriota.

In 1997 he was elected to the Chamber of Deputies, as the CONDEPA candidate in the single-member constituency Nr. 7 (which covers areas of the Murillo province). His alternate was Zenón Yupanqui Alejo. Hurtado Castellón was the head of the Journalists' and Social Communication Council of CONDEPA. He was also the National Election Campaign Press Chief of the party. He was a member of the commission of the campaign "Palenque 97".

Hurtado Castellón contested the parliamentary constituency no. 7 once again in the 2002 election, but as a UCS candidate. His candidate for alternate was Victor Severo Quispe Santander.
