= Verónica Palenque =

Bolivian psychologist, journalist, academic and politician

Member of the Chamber of Deputies from La Paz
- In office 6 August 1997 – 6 August 2002
- President: Hugo Banzer; Jorge Quiroga

Personal details
- Born: Verónica Palenque Yanguas; 25 July 1967 (age 58) La Paz, Bolivia
- Political party: Conscience of Fatherland
- Children: Verónica Barrientos Palenque
- Parent(s): Carlos Palenque; Marta Yanguas
- Education: Universidad Católica Boliviana; Higher University of San Andrés

Verónica Palenque Yanguas (born 25 July 1967) is a Bolivian psychologist, businesswoman, journalist, television presenter, university professor, and politician. She is the eldest daughter of politician and journalist Carlos Palenque (El Compadre). She is currently the general manager of Palenque Comunicaciones, a holding company that includes Radio Carlos Palenque AM 1,200, a monthly magazine and Palenque TV (Channel 47).

== Biography ==
Palenque was born in La Paz on 25 July 1967. She is the daughter of the Bolivian journalist and politician Carlos Palenque. She did her primary and secondary studies in her hometown. She continued with her higher studies entering the career of psychology at the Universidad Católica Boliviana (UCB). Later, she obtained a master's degree in Philosophy and Political Science at CIDES, Mastery in Security, Defense and Development at the School of High Military Studies (Higher University of San Andrés) and a doctorate in Contemporary Political Processes at the University of Salamanca in Spain, in addition to other degrees in diplomas and specializations.

== Career ==
=== Media career ===
Palenque started her media career at the age of 18 in 1985. That year, she hosted the program "Hablando con los Niños" on Bolivia TV. In 1986, she hosted the program "Hablando con ..." on the same channel. In 1987, at the age of 20, her daughter Verónica Barrientos Palenque was born. In 1992, she started working at Channel 4 RTP to create the program "Todo Shopping" and later the programs "Hola Verónica" in 1993 and La Tribuna Libre del Pueblo in 1996.

=== Political career ===
Palenque served as a deputy for the Conscience of Fatherland representing the Department of La Paz in the National Congress, holding the position from 1997 to 2002. After her departure, Palenque did not enter politics again.

=== Return to public life ===
In 2000, Palenque founded Radio Carlos Palenque A.M. 1,200 and in 2010, she created her own channel called Palenque TV (Channel 47), where she conducts the programs "Sabor a Tierra", a political, social and economic analysis program, "La Tribuna", a space of solidarity and orientation to the people and a feminine debate called "Diosas" where they talk about topics never discussed before.

In 2015, Palenque celebrated 30 years of her journalistic career on Bolivian television. She is currently President of the Association of Radio Broadcasters of La Paz ASBORA and First Vice President of the football club The Strongest.
