= Augusto Valda Vargas =

Bolivian politician (born 1957)

Augusto Valda Vargas (born August 28, 1957, Suqusniyuk) is a Bolivian politician and journalist. He holds a master's degree in Andean Linguistics. Valda Vargas has served as secretary of the Constructors Federation of Chuiquisaca, as general secretary of the Agrarian Trade Union and president of the Native Language Communicator's Association of Chuquisaca. He was a member of the Revolutionary Left Movement (MIR) until 1985.

In 1997 he was elected to the Chamber of Deputies, as the Free Bolivia Movement (MBL) candidate in the single-member constituency No. 3 (which covers areas of the Oropeza and Yamparaez provinces). His alternate was José F. Gonzales Ramos.
