= Manuel Suárez =

Manuel Suárez may refer to:

- Manuel Suárez (athlete) (1920–2001), Spanish Olympic hurdler
- Manuel Suárez Ávila (born 1968), Bolivian politician
- Manuel Suárez (Chilean footballer) (born 1972), Chilean football manager and former goalkeeper
- Manuel Suárez (fencer) (born 1950), Cuban Olympic fencer
- Manuel Suárez Fernández (1895–1954), Spanish Dominican friar and Catholic priest
- Manuel Suárez (geologist), a discoverer of Chilesaurus
- Manuel Suárez (Peruvian footballer) (1940–2012), Peruvian footballer
- Manuel Suárez (rower) (born 1989), Cuban rower
- Manuel Suárez (Spanish footballer) (1895–1936), Spanish footballer
- Manuel Suárez y Suárez (1896–1987), Spanish immigrant to Mexico, entrepreneur and patron of the arts
- Manuel Isidoro Suárez (1799–1846), Argentine Army colonel
