= 1997 Bolivian general election =

- Registered: 3,252,501
- Turnout: 71.36% (▼0.80pp)
- Presidential election
- 1 June 1997 (popular vote) 6 August 1997 (Congress vote)
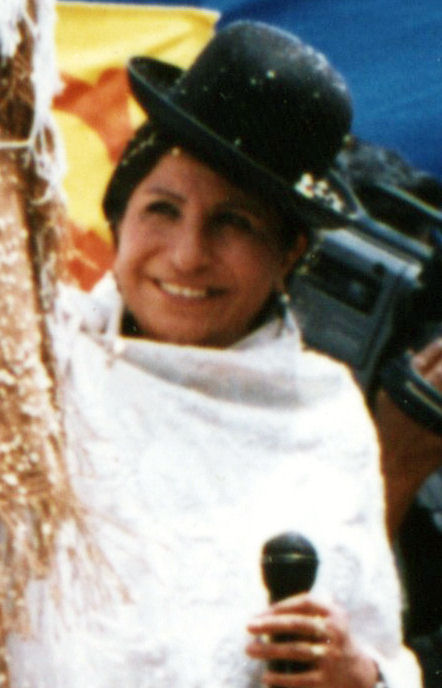

| Nominee | Hugo Banzer | Juan Carlos Durán | Remedios Loza |
| Party | ADN–PDC–NFR | MNR | CONDEPA |
| Running mate | Jorge Quiroga | Percy Fernández | Gonzalo Ruiz Paz |
| Electoral vote | 118 | 50 |
| Popular vote | 484,705 | 396,235 | 373,528 |
| Percentage | 22.26% | 18.20% | 17.16% |
| Nominee | Jaime Paz Zamora | Ivo Kuljis |
| Party | MIR–FRI | UCS |
| Running mate | Samuel Doria Medina | Juan Chahín |
| Popular vote | 365,005 | 350,728 |
| Percentage | 16.77% | 16.11% |
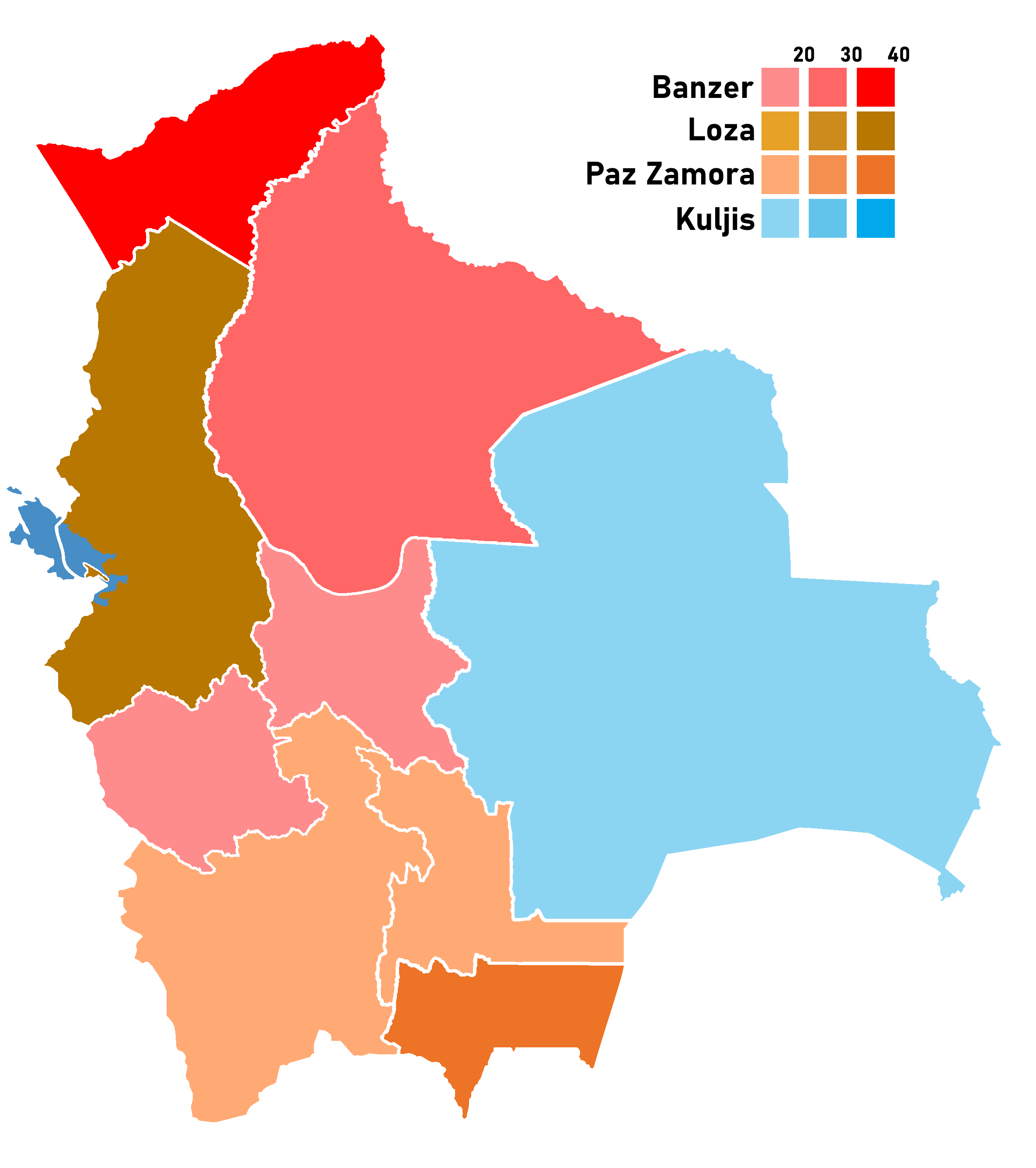
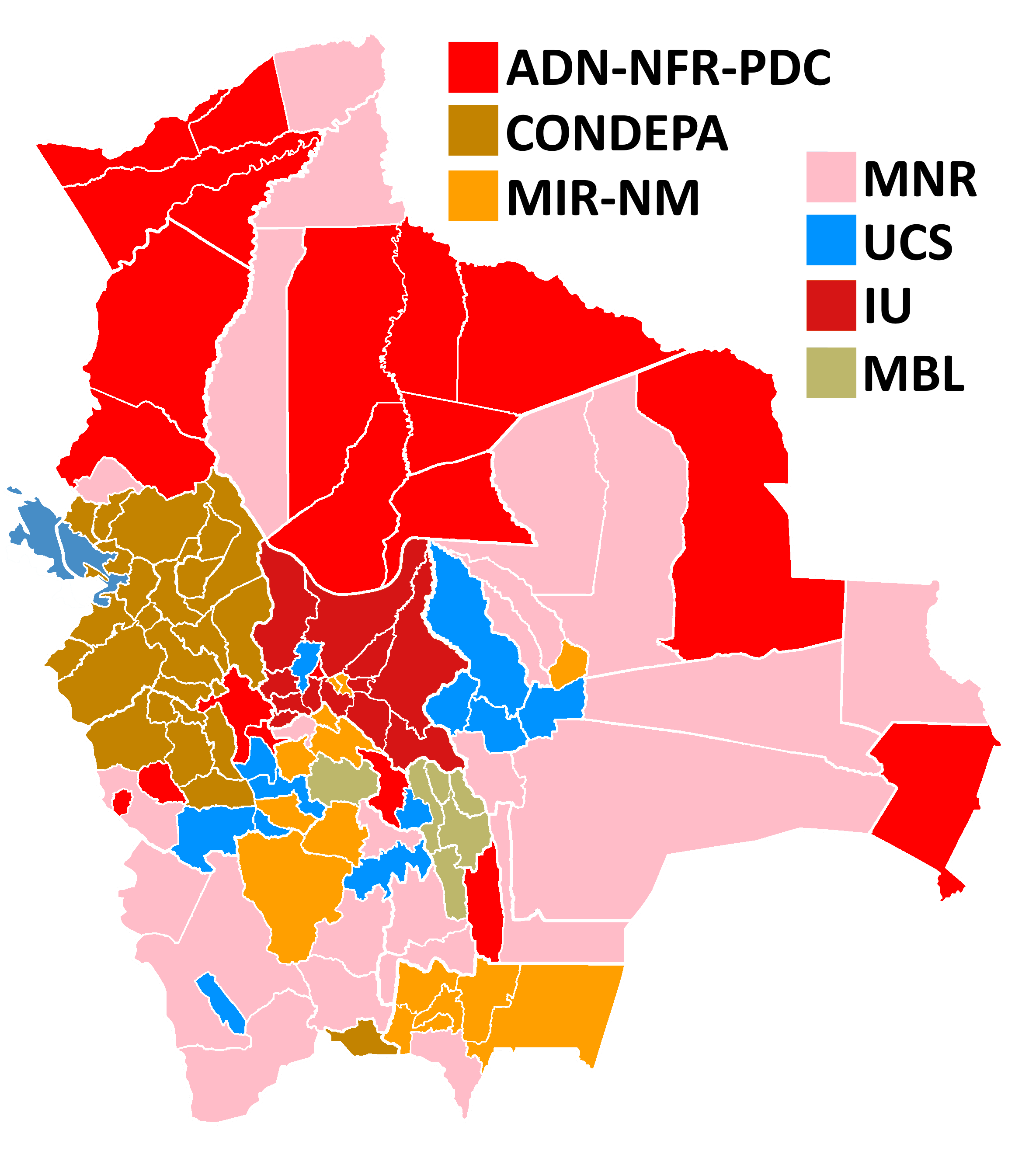
President before election
Gonzalo Sánchez de Lozada
MNR
Elected President
Hugo Banzer
ADN
- Chamber of Deputies
- 1 June 1997
- All 130 seats in the Chamber of Deputies
| Party | Seats | +/– |
|---|---|---|
| ADN–PDC–NFR | 32 | −3 |
| MNR | 26 | −26 |
| MIR–FRI | 23 | +23 |
| UCS | 21 | +1 |
| CONDEPA | 19 | +6 |
| MBL | 5 | −2 |
| IU | 4 | +4 |
This lists parties that won seats. See the complete results below.
- Chamber of Senators
- 1 June 1997
- All 36 seats in the Chamber of Senators
| Party | Seats | +/– |
|---|---|---|
| ADN–PDC–NFR | 11 | +3 |
| MIR–FRI | 7 | +7 |
| MNR | 4 | −13 |
| CONDEPA | 3 | +2 |
| UCS | 2 | −5 |
This lists parties that won seats. See the complete results below.

General elections were held in Bolivia on 1 June 1997. As no candidate for the presidency received over 50% of the vote, the National Congress was required to elect a president on 4 August. Hugo Banzer of Nationalist Democratic Action (ADN) was subsequently elected. Whilst the ADN emerged as the largest party in Congress, it failed to win a majority of seats, and formed a coalition government with the Revolutionary Left Movement, Conscience of Fatherland and the Solidarity Civic Unity.

== Electoral system ==
A number of electoral reforms were introduced in 1994. The double simultaneous vote (DSV) system, under which voters cast a single vote for president, Chamber of Deputies and Chamber of Senators, was modified to introduce a mixed-member proportional representation for the Chamber of Deputies. Voters still had a DSV vote that determined the presidency, members of the Chamber of Senators and the seat distribution of the Chamber of Deputies, but had an additional vote to determine the winners of 68 single-member constituencies for the Chamber. The other 62 seats in the Chamber became leveling seats to ensure that the proportion of seats held by each party was equivalent to the percentage of its vote share in the DSV vote, and were elected by closed list proportional representation in nine multi-member constituencies. A further reform in 1997, shortly before the elections, introduced a 3% electoral threshold and determined that seat allocation for the proportional Chamber seats would be carried out by the d'Hondt method. The 27 seats in the Chamber of Senators were elected in nine three-member constituencies using the DSV vote; the party with the most votes was awarded two seats and the runner-up one.

As a result of modifications to the constitution in 1994 and 1995, the voting age was reduced to eighteen, while presidential and congressional terms were increased from four to five years.

== Campaign ==
Incumbent president Gonzalo Sánchez de Lozada chose René Blattmann, minister of justice and human rights, as the MNR's presidential candidate. Blattmann's reformations to the judicial system had gained him great popularity among the population with him holding a 34% electoral preference to Hugo Banzer's 14% upon the announcement of his candidacy in December 1996. However, René Blattmann surprisingly renounced his candidacy at the end of January 1997. Juan Carlos Durán became the new MNR candidate but the damage to the party's electoral campaign was irreversible.

Hugo Banzer, who had run in the past five elections, had stated in 1993 that he would not present himself again as a candidate. Nevertheless, Banzer announced his 1997 candidacy anyway. Former president Jaime Paz Zamora of the MIR also announced his intention to seek a second term.

The "neo-populist" Max Fernández of the UCS and Carlos Palenque of CONDEPA had seen their parties' best performances in 1993. However, the premature death of both leaders (Fernández in a plane crash in 1995, Palenque of a heart attack in March 1997, less than three months before the election) hurt their parties' chances of winning. Jhonny Fernández, Max Fernández's son, was not yet of legal age to run, leading the UCS to present as their candidate Ivo Kuljis, who incidentally had been Carlos Palenque's CONDEPA running mate in 1993. CONDEPA, in turn, presented Remedios Loza, making her the first female presidential candidate in Bolivia history. The fact that Loza was Aymara won her some support among Bolivia's marginalized indigenous population.

Economic and social issues dominated the campaign, with all major parties promising to continue the free market policies implemented by outgoing President Gonzalo Sánchez de Lozada. Whilst Juan Carlos Durán emphasised the free market reforms, Hugo Banzer promised to improve the lives of the indigenous population.

== Results ==
=== President ===
Ultimately, the divided electoral field and the woes of the MNR resulted in Hugo Banzer claiming a narrow plurality vote victory of 22.26%, the lowest margin of victory for any presidential candidate in Bolivian history.

As no candidate reached the required 50% majority, the National Congress convened to elect the president. Members of both chambers voted on the president. Banzer was supported by his ADN-NFR-PDC political alliance as well as by the MIR, CONDEPA, and UCS. Juan Carlos Durán would only receive the support of the MNR. The four IU and five MBL deputies abstained.

| Candidate | Running mate | Party | Popular vote | | Congressional vote | |
| Candidate | Running mate | Party | Votes | % | Votes | % |
|---|---|---|---|---|---|---|
| Hugo Banzer | Jorge Quiroga | ADN–PDC–NFR | 484,705 | 22.26 | 118 | 79.73 |
| Juan Carlos Durán | Percy Fernández | Revolutionary Nationalist Movement | 396,235 | 18.20 | 30 | 20.27 |
| Remedios Loza | Gonzalo Ruiz Paz | Conscience of Fatherland | 373,528 | 17.16 | | |
| Jaime Paz Zamora | Samuel Doria Medina | Revolutionary Left Movement | 365,005 | 16.77 | | |
| Ivo Kuljis Fuchner | Juan Chahín | Solidarity Civic Unity | 350,728 | 16.11 | | |
| Alejo Véliz | Marcos Domic Ruiz | United Left | 80,806 | 3.71 | | |
| Miguel Urioste Fernández | Marcial Fabricano | Free Bolivia Movement | 67,244 | 3.09 | | |
| Jerjes Justiniano Talavera | Sonia Montaño Ferrufino | Bolivian Socialist Vanguard | 30,212 | 1.39 | | |
| Ramiro Barrenechea | Juan de la Cruz Villca Choque | Patriotic Convergence Axis | 18,327 | 0.84 | | |
| Eudoro Galindo | Ángel Cardona Ayoroa | Bolivian Democratic Party | 10,381 | 0.48 | | |
| Total | | | 2,177,171 | 100.00 | 148 | 100.00 |
| Valid votes | | | 2,177,171 | 93.80 | 148 | 100.00 |
| Invalid/blank votes | | | 143,946 | 6.20 | 0 | 0.00 |
| Total votes | | | 2,321,117 | 100.00 | 148 | 100.00 |
| Registered voters/turnout | | | 3,252,501 | 71.36 | 157 | 94.27 |
Source: Nohlen

=== Chamber of Deputies ===
| Party | List | | | Constituency | | | Total seats | +/– |
| Party | Votes | % | Seats | Votes | % | Seats | Total seats | +/– |
|---|---|---|---|---|---|---|---|---|
| ADN–PDC–NFR | 484,705 | 22.26 | 14 | 457,470 | 22.16 | 18 | 32 | – |
| Revolutionary Nationalist Movement | 396,235 | 18.20 | 14 | 368,777 | 17.86 | 12 | 26 | –26 |
| Conscience of Fatherland | 373,528 | 17.16 | 7 | 289,828 | 14.04 | 12 | 19 | +6 |
| Revolutionary Left Movement | 365,005 | 16.77 | 11 | 358,004 | 17.34 | 12 | 23 | – |
| Solidarity Civic Unity | 350,728 | 16.11 | 16 | 290,472 | 14.07 | 5 | 21 | +1 |
| United Left | 80,806 | 3.71 | 0 | 81,001 | 3.92 | 4 | 4 | +4 |
| Free Bolivia Movement | 67,244 | 3.09 | 0 | 130,095 | 6.30 | 5 | 5 | –2 |
| Bolivian Socialist Vanguard | 30,212 | 1.39 | 0 | 34,034 | 1.65 | 0 | 0 | New |
| Patriotic Convergence Axis | 18,327 | 0.84 | 0 | 32,493 | 1.57 | 0 | 0 | New |
| Bolivian Democratic Party | 10,381 | 0.48 | 0 | 22,079 | 1.07 | 0 | 0 | New |
| Total | 2,177,171 | 100.00 | 62 | 2,064,253 | 100.00 | 68 | 130 | 0 |
| Valid votes | 2,177,171 | 93.80 | | 2,064,253 | 89.12 | | | |
| Invalid votes | 67,203 | 2.90 | | 52,452 | 2.26 | | | |
| Blank votes | 76,743 | 3.31 | | 199,496 | 8.61 | | | |
| Total votes | 2,321,117 | 100.00 | | 2,316,201 | 100.00 | | | |
| Registered voters/turnout | 3,252,501 | 71.36 | | 3,252,501 | 71.21 | | | |
Source: Nohlen, OEP, Election Passport, FUNDEMOS

=== Chamber of Senators ===
| Party | Votes | % | Seats | +/– |
|---|---|---|---|---|
| ADN–PDC–NFR | 484,705 | 22.26 | 11 | – |
| Revolutionary Nationalist Movement | 396,235 | 18.20 | 4 | –13 |
| Conscience of Fatherland | 373,528 | 17.16 | 3 | +2 |
| Revolutionary Left Movement | 365,005 | 16.77 | 7 | – |
| Solidarity Civic Unity | 350,728 | 16.11 | 2 | +1 |
| United Left | 80,806 | 3.71 | 0 | 0 |
| Free Bolivia Movement | 67,244 | 3.09 | 0 | 0 |
| Bolivian Socialist Vanguard | 30,212 | 1.39 | 0 | New |
| Patriotic Convergence Axis | 18,327 | 0.84 | 0 | New |
| Bolivian Democratic Party | 10,381 | 0.48 | 0 | New |
| Total | 2,177,171 | 100.00 | 27 | 0 |
| Valid votes | 2,177,171 | 93.80 | | |
| Invalid/blank votes | 143,946 | 6.20 | | |
| Total votes | 2,321,117 | 100.00 | | |
| Registered voters/turnout | 3,252,501 | 71.36 | | |
Source: Nohlen

== See also ==
- Bolivian National Congress, 1997–2002

== Bibliography ==
- Mesa Gisbert, Carlos D. (2003). Presidentes de Bolivia: entre urnas y fusiles : el poder ejecutivo, los ministros de estado (in Spanish). Editorial Gisbert.
