= Jaalil Melgar =

Bolivia politician

Jaalil Raacichd Melgar Mustafá (October 7, 1953 (age 71) Santa Cruz de la Sierra) is a Bolivian politician and lawyer. In 1996 he became General Secretary of the municipality of Santa Cruz de la Sierra, as well as Secretary of Industry and Commerce of the municipality. In 1997 he was elected to the Chamber of Deputies, as the UCS candidate in the single-member constituency No. 53 (which covers areas of the Andrés Ibañez province). His alternate was Juan Cancio Quisbert Huanca. He was elected President of the Chamber of Deputies. In 2000, he published a book titled La fuerza de la verdad ('The force of truth') regarding the first half of his parliamentary tenure.

As of 2002, he served as the president of the Consultative Council of UCS, the Lawyers' cell of UCS in Santa Cruz, and the Professionals' cell of UCS in Santa Cruz. In 2004, after having left UCS, he was the leading candidate of the 'Arena' citizens' grouping (a group led by former ADN parliamentarian Hugo Suárez Arana Feeney) for the municipal council of the town of Cotoca.

After retiring from political life, Melgar Mustafá began running a family restaurant outside of Cotoca.
