= Gonzalo Aguirre Villafán =

Bolivian politician

Gonzalo Aguirre Villafán (born February 8, 1951, in Sucre) is a Bolivian politician. A company administrator by profession, Aguirre Villafán obtained post-graduate degrees in Integral Development Planification (Rehovot, Israel) and Agrarian Administration (Kibbutz Shefayim). He was the president of the Bolivian University Confederation (CUB) between 1978 and 1982. In 1985 he founded PROAGRO, an institution he directed until 1993. He was the manager of the Chuiquisaca Development Corporation (CORDECH) between 1993 and 1995. Between 1996 and 1997 he served as the General Secretary of the Chuquisaca Prefecture.

In 1997 he was elected to the Chamber of Deputies, as the Free Bolivia Movement (MBL) candidate in the single-member constituency No. 4 (which covers areas of the Zudañez, Tomina and Belisario Boeto provinces). His alternate was Félix García Cáceres. He served as president of the Defense Commission in parliament. In the 2002 parliamentary election, he again contested the No. 4 single-member constituency on behalf of MBL. He was defeated by a Revolutionary Left Movement (MIR) candidate by 5,800 to 5,600 votes. The MBL cried foul and claimed that there had been irregularities in the vote in the constituency. Three weeks later Aguirre Villafán and a group of local mayors left MBL to join the Revolutionary Nationalist Movement (MNR). In a document addressed "to the People of Bolivia" the dissidents claimed that MBL had ceased to function as a relevant political instrument of the people.
