= Guillermo Klinsky =

Bolivia politician

Saúl Guillermo Klinsky Callaú (27 September 1927 in Santa Cruz de la Sierra – 22 June 2014), was a Bolivian politician. A driver by profession, Klinsky Callaú was an executive member of the Driver Confederation of Bolivia and a National Dean of Transport. He also founded the November 16 Federation in Santa Cruz.

In 1997 he was elected to the Chamber of Deputies from Santa Cruz through the proportional representation vote as a Civic Solidarity Union (UCS) candidate. Denny Guzmán Campero was his alternate. In 2000 he was appointed head of the UCS organization in the Santa Cruz Department. Klinsky Callaú stood for re-election 2002, but lost his seat.
