= Juan Huanca Colque =

Bolivian politician

Juan Huanca Colque (b. December 27, 1966, Pucara) is a Bolivian politician.

Between 1993 and 1995 he served as Provincial Organizing Secretary of CONDEPA. In 1995 he became the head of the provincial organization of the party, and he following year he became the head of the party organization in the parliamentary constituency Nr. 21 (which covers areas of the provinces of Loayza, Aroma and Gualberto Villarroel). In 1997 he was elected to the Chamber of Deputies, as the CONDEPA candidate in the single-member constituency Nr. 21. His alternate was Francisca Cárdenas Luna.
