= Luis Jorge Mayser Ardaya =

Bolivia politician (1928–2025)

Luis Jorge Mayser Ardaya (Spanish: [luˈis ˈxorxe maiˈseɾ aɾˈðaʝa]; 29 July 1928 – 1 February 2025) was a Bolivian politician, rancher and writer. He was the general secretary of the Bolivian Socialist Falange (FSB), a nationalist party that opposed both communism and liberalism. Mayser joined FSB at the age of 12, and continued through all of his life. He even met the leader of FSB, Óscar Únzaga de la Vega, and collaborated with him many times.

== Life and career ==
Mayser was born in San Ignacio de Velasco, Santa Cruz on 29 July 1928. He was elected to the Chamber of Deputies in 1997, from the single-member constituency 58 in Santa Cruz, covering areas in the provinces of Velasco, Chiquitos, Ángel Sandóval and Germán Busch, on a Nationalist Democratic Action (ADN) ticket. At the time, he was the sole FSB parliamentarian.

In 2004, Mayser was awarded the title "hijo ilustre" (outstanding son) by the Santa Cruz de la Sierra municipal council, for his role in founding the Comité Pro Santa Cruz. Mayser has united regional committees from various provinces of Santa Cruz Department, and led actions that derived in the foundation of the Civic Committee for Santa Cruz (Comité Cívico pro Santa Cruz) in October 1950.

Mayser died on 1 February 2025, at the age of 96.

== Bibliography ==
Mayser was the author of Alto Paraguá: verdaderas guerrillas bolivianas (High Paraguá: True Bolivian Guerrillas, 2008), an account of the struggle of the FSB against the Revolutionary Nationalist Movement government. He also authored Santa Cruz y sus provincias. Another book wrote by him was Nacimiento del Comité pro Santa Cruz (2007), in which he tells the story of how this regional institution was born.
