= Jorge Torres Obleas =

Bolivian politician and engineer

Jorge Torres Obleas (born May 24, 1957, in La Paz) is a Bolivian politician and engineer. Holding master's degrees in Electrical Engineering and Economic Planning, Torres Obleas has worked as a consultant in various Latin American countries. He has also served as a lecturer at the Universidad Mayor de San Andrés in La Paz.

Since 2009, he has been dedicated to academic activities at Universidad César Vallejo (UCV) in Peru, where he teaches and has served as Director of the Graduate School in Lima as well as various professional schools.He led the academic implementation of UCV’s first virtual programs and the public licensing process for the university’s graduate units nationwide. Since 2022, he has served as Academic Director of UCV Virtual, overseeing the university’s online programs and leading projects with state-of-the-art technologies in virtual learning environments. These initiatives aim to democratize education and, in particular, expand access to high-quality university education for populations in vulnerable regions of Peru and beyond.

Torres Obleas was a member of parliament (Chamber of Deputies) between 1989 and 1993, and served as the president of the Commission on Environment and Natural Resources as well as presiding over the Commission on Economic Planning. Following his parliamentary tenure, he was coordinator in charge of formulating the National Governability Programme 1993–1994.

Torres Obleas was the director of the daily newspaper Hoy between 1994 and 1995. He has also been a columnist for newspapers such as La Razón, La Estrella del Oriente and El Deber.

He was re-elected to the Chamber of Deputies in 1997, through the proportional representation vote in La Paz as a Revolutionary Left Movement (MIR) candidate. His alternate was Beatríz Peinado de Solíz. As of 2002, he was a member of the Executive Committee of MIR and the president of the Potosí Foundation.

Torres Obleas served as Minister of Economic Development in the second cabinet of Gonzalo Sanchez de Lozada 2002–2003.

Torres Obleas left Bolivia in 2009, avoiding standing trial on accusation of involvement in the "Black October" killings (a military crackdown on protesters in 2003, in which more than 60 people died). He was granted asylum by the Peruvian government.
