= Angelo Porcel =

Bolivian politician

Raúl Angelo Porcel Gonzales (November 6, 1954, Sucre) is a Bolivian politician and journalist. Porcel was a member of the Potosí Regional Committee of the Christian Democratic Party (PDC) between 1977 and 1980. He was the executive secretary of the University Workers Trade Union at the UTF between 1978 and 1980, after which he served as the executive secretary of the Bank Employees Federation of Potosí between 1982 and 1993. In the bank employees trade union movement, he was the conflict secretary of the Bank Workers Confederation of Bolivia between 1983 and 1985.

Porcel became a member of the Political Committee of the Revolutionary Left Movement (MIR) in 1996. Between 1996 and 1997 he served as a municipal council member in Potosí. In 1997 he was elected to the Chamber of Deputies, as the MIR candidate in the single-member circumscription 38 (which covers areas of the Tomás Frías province). His substitute was Edwin Rodríguez Espejo. He sought reelection in the 2002 parliamentary election in the same constituency.
