= Daniel Santalla =

Bolivian politician

Daniel Santalla Torres

Minister of Labour
- In office 2 June 2011 – 22 January 2015
- President: Evo Morales
- Preceded by: Félix Rojas

Deputy in the Bolivian Chamber of Deputies
- In office 1993–2002
- Constituency: La Paz (uninominal seat)

Personal details
- Born: Guaqui, La Paz, Bolivia
- Other political affiliations: Conscience of Fatherland
- Occupation: Trade unionist

Daniel Santalla Torres is a Bolivian politician and former trade unionist who served as Bolivia's Minister of Labour from 2011 to 2015.

== Biography ==
Santalla was born in Guaqui, La Paz. He graduated with a degree in political science from the Universidad Mayor de San Andres in La Paz. He was a union leader at the politically active Said Factory for 25 years, rising to serve as an officer of the National Confederation of Factory Workers and as the General Secretary of the Bolivian Workers' Center (COB). He became a deputy from a district in La Paz department in the National Congress of Bolivia in 1993 with the Conscience of Fatherland Party, serving for two terms until 2002. Following Félix Rojas' departure from office as Minister of Labor amid charges of corruption in the Ministry, Evo Morales tapped Santalla to lead the ministry in 2011.
