= Manuel Suárez Ávila =

Manuel Suárez Ávila (born 12 February 1968, Trinidad) is a Bolivian politician.

Suárez Ávila studied political science. He was a councilor at the Bolivian Embassy in Madrid in 1995, and a councilor at the Bolivian mission at the United Nations in Geneva 1995-1997.

He was elected to the Chamber of Deputies in 1997, through the proportional representation vote in Beni as a Revolutionary Nationalist Movement (MNR) candidate. His alternate was Martha T. Gutiérrez de Anderson. Suárez Ávila headed the Permanent Ethics Committee in the parliament, which oversaw the expulsion from the parliament of deputy Evo Morales Ayma in 2002.

Suárez Ávila served as interim Minister of the Presidency in the cabinet of Carlos Mesa.
