= Francisco Vaca =

Bolivian politician (born 1951)

Francisco Vaca Gutiérrez (born July 24, 1951, in Tarija) is a Bolivian politician.

Vaca studied architecture, and obtained a post-graduate degree from the Universidad Andina in Sucre. He was a municipal councilor in Tarija 1991–1992, and served as interim mayor of the city during the same period. Between 1996 and 1997 he was a councilor of the Tarija Department.

In 1997 he was elected to the Chamber of Deputies, as the Revolutionary Left Front (FRI) candidate in the single-member constituency Nr. 46 (which covers areas of the Cercado province). His alternate was Amado Baldivieso Arroyo.
