= Solidarity Civic Unity =

Solidarity Civic Unity Unidad Cívica Solidaridad
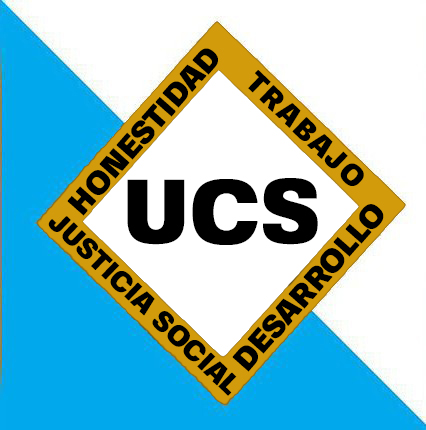
- Leader: Jhonny Fernández
- Founded: 15 August 1989
- Headquarters: Santa Cruz de la Sierra, Bolivia
- Ideology: Conservatism; Populism
- Political position: Centre-right to right-wing
- National affiliation: Creemos
- Regional affiliation: Union of Latin American Parties
- Chamber of Deputies: 0 / 130

Party flag

Solidarity Civic Unity (Spanish: Unidad Cívica Solidaridad, UCS) was a political party in Bolivia. The party was founded on 15 August 1989 by Max Fernández, and is currently led by his son, Jhonny Fernández.

UCS was part of the "Megacoalition" that supported the presidency of Hugo Banzer from 1997 to 2001. The coalition also included Banzer's Nationalist Democratic Action (ADN), the Revolutionary Left Movement (MIR), and Conscience of Fatherland (CONDEPA).

At the 2002 Bolivian general election, the party won 5.3% of the popular vote and five out of 130 seats in the Chamber of Deputies but no Senate seats.

== Election results ==
=== Presidential elections ===
Election	Presidential nominee	Votes	%	Votes	%	Result
Election	Presidential nominee	First round		Second round		Result
1993	Max Fernández	226,816	13.77%			Lost ✗
1997	Ivo Kuljis	350,728	16.11%			Lost ✗
2002	Jhonny Fernández	153,210	5.51%			Lost ✗
2005	Did not contest					
2009	Did not contest					
2014	Did not contest					
2019	Víctor Hugo Cárdenas	25,283	0.41%			Annulled ✗
2020	Luis Fernando Camacho (Creemos)	862,186	14.00%			Lost ✗
2025	Jhonny Fernández	89,253	1.67%			Lost ✗

=== Chamber of Deputies and Senate elections ===
Election	Party leader	Votes	%	Chamber seats	+/-	Position	Senate seats	+/-	Position	Status
1993	Max Fernández	226,816	13.77%	20 / 130	New	▲4th	1 / 27	New	▲3rd	Coalition
1997	Jhonny Fernández	350,728	16.11%	21 / 130	▲1	▼5th	2 / 27	▲1	▼5th	Coalition
2002	Jhonny Fernández	In coalition with FSB		5 / 130	▼16	▼6th	0 / 27	▼2	▼6th	Opposition
2005	Did not contest			0 / 130	▼5	—N/a	0 / 27	0	—N/a	Extra-parliamentary
2009	Did not contest			0 / 130	0	—N/a	0 / 36	0	—N/a	Extra-parliamentary
2014	Did not contest			0 / 130	0	—N/a	0 / 36	0	—N/a	Extra-parliamentary
2019	Jhonny Fernández	24,011	0.40%	0 / 130	0	▲5th	0 / 36	0	▲4th	Annulled
2020	Jhonny Fernández	As part of Creemos		16 / 130	▲16	▲3rd	4 / 36	▲4	▲2rd	Opposition
2025	Jhonny Fernández	As part of Force of the People		0 / 130	▼16	▼7th	0 / 36	▼4	▼5th	Extra-parliamentary

== See also ==
- Category:Solidarity Civic Unity politicians
