= Leftwing Revolutionary Nationalist Movement – 20th Century =

The Leftwing Revolutionary Nationalist Movement – 20th Century (Spanish: Movimiento Nacionalista Revolucionario de Izquierda - Siglo XX, abbreviated MNRI-Siglo XX) was a political party in Bolivia. MNRI-Siglo XX was founded in August 1984, after a fraction of technocrats broke away from Hernán Siles Zuazo's ruling Revolutionary Nationalist Leftwing Movement (MNRI). The main leader of MNRI-Siglo XX was Mario Velarde Dorado, former Minister of Foreign Affairs. The party dissolved itself as it merged with the Revolutionary Nationalist Movement.

== Political outlook ==
The founders of MNRI-Siglo XX accused MNRI of sectarianism and opportunism, said to be the causes behind the debacle of UDP. The new party identified itself as the 'revolutionary tendency' that had emerged from MNRI. The manifesto of the party declared it as seeking 'the hegemony of the working class and popular sectors in the national liberation process'. The party stated that it sought to promote a mixed economy, with a strong cooperative sector. In international politics, the party claimed to represent anti-colonial and anti-imperialist viewpoints, favouring non-alignment.

== Leadership ==
The National Command of MNRI-Siglo XX consisted of Mario Velarde Dorado, Franklin Anaya Vásquez, Orlando Cossio Romero, Marcelo Barrón Rondón, Reynaldo Mercado Uribe, Joaquín Monasterio Pinckert, Enrique Ipiña Melgar, Marcos Tufiño Banzer, Marcial Tamayo Sáenz, José Rivero Vargas, Jorge Rivero Vargas, Gladys San Martín de Rodríguez, María Escobar, Casta Jaimes, Sandra Urquidi Collins, Martha Arévalo, Jorge Rioja Pérez, Guido Menacho, and Guillermo Bazoberry.
