= Emigdio Flores =

Bolivian politician (born 1950)

Emigdio Flores Calpiñeiro (born July 30, 1950, Cobija) is a Bolivian politician and sociologist, educated at the French Paul Valéry University.

== Biography ==
Flores Calpiñeiro was a professor at the Federal University of Acre (Brazil) from 1982 to 1988. During this period, he served as a technical manager at the Acre State Planning Commission. Between 1984 and 1986 he coordinated the Integral Rural Development Programme of Acre. He directed the Working Group of the PLANACRE, the Acre State Development Plan, 1986–1987.

Flores Calpiñeiro was elected to the Bolivian parliament in 1989, 1993 and 1997. 1989-1990 he was the president of the Commission on Environment and Natural Resources. 1993-1994 he was the president of the Science and Technology Commission. In 1997 he was elected from Pando, through the proportional representation vote as a Revolutionary Left Movement (MIR) candidate. During this tenure, he was also the president of the Amazonic Parliament.

As of 2002, he was the second-in-command in MIR in Pando and a member of the national Political and Executive Committee of MIR.
