= Juan Carlos Riss =

Bolivian politician and economist

Juan Carlos Riss Cecin (born April 14, 1955, in Cobija) is a Bolivian politician. An economist by profession, Riss Cecin served as a parliamentarian in the Chamber of Deputies 1989–1993, Senator 1993–1997 and again in the Chamber of Deputies (elected from Pando through proportional representation on the list of the Revolutionary Nationalist Movement). Furthermore, he served as the prefect of Pando 1995–1996.

As of 2002, Riss Cecin was the president of the "Pando" mutual aid scheme, General Manager of CORDEPANDO (Pando Development Corporation) and Manager of Teléfonos Automáticos de Cobija. He served as president of CORDEPANDO 1984–1985 and 1985–1988.
