= Hormando Vaca Díez =

Bolivian politician

Hormando Vaca Díez (April 30, 1949 – February 9, 2010 in Warnes, Santa Cruz) was the President of the Senate of Bolivia, the upper house of the Bolivian National Congress, from 2003 to August 2005.

He was President of the Chamber of Deputies from August 1997 to August 1998.

In line for the post of president after Carlos Mesa's resignation, he declined amid protests against him, in a televised speech where he stated that the recent protests were caused by Carlos Mesa and Evo Morales. He died on February 9, 2010, in a quinta in the city of Warnes, due to a heart attack.
