= President of the Chamber of Deputies of Bolivia =

Presiding officer of the lower chamber of the National Congress of Bolivia

The president of the Chamber of Deputies is the presiding officer of the lower chamber of the National Congress of Bolivia. The president is currently elected for a one-year term.

Below is a list of office-holders.

Name	Took office	Left office	Notes
José Mariano Serrano	10 June 1825	6 October 1825	President of general assembly
Casimiro Olañeta	25 May 1826	1826	
Matías Terrazas	1826	1826	
Juan Manuel Mercado	1826	1826	
Eusebio Gutiérrez	1826	December 1826	
José María Pérez de Urdininea	December 1826	December 1826	
Mariano Guzmán	December 1826	August 1828 - ?	
Crispin Díez de Medina	1828	1828 - ?	
Narciso Dulón	?	? - 1831	
Miguel María de Aguirre	24 June 1831	July 1831 - ?	
Casimiro Olañeta	? - August 1831	August 1831 - ?	
José María Dalence	September 1831	1831 - ?	
Mariano Enrique Calvo	?	1832	
José Eustaquio Eguivar	1832	6 November 1832	
José Ballivián	? - October 1833	November 1834 - ?	
Manuel Estéban Ponce de León	?	?	
José Lorenzo Maldonado	? - 1835	1835 - ?	
Fermín Eyzaguirre	?	?	
Manuel Sánchez de Velasco	?	?	
José Mariano Serrano	? - June 1839	October 1839	
José Maria Linares	October 1839	November 1839	
Gregorio Reinolds	November 1839	November 1839 - ?	
Manuel Fernando Bacaflor	? - October 1840	November 1840 - ?	
Manuel Escobar	? - April 1843	April 1843	
Manuel Hermenegildo Guerra	April 1843	June 1843	President of the national convention
José Lorenzo Maldonado	? - 1844	1845 - ?	
Rafael Bustillos	?	October 1846	
Mariano Ballivián	October 1846	1847 - ?	
Manuel de la Cruz Méndez	? - 1847	1847 - ?	
José María Linares	? - September 1848	September 1848 - ?	
Manuel Macedonio Salinas	?	?	
Hilarión Fernandez	? - October 1848	October 1848 - ?	
Juan Crisóstomo Unzueta	? - October 1850	October 1850 - ?	
Melchor Urquidi	July 1851	August 1851	President of the national convention
Juan de la Cruz Cisneros	August 1851	November 1851	President of the national convention
Emeterio Villamil	1857	1861	
Manuel José Cortés	? - June 1861	June 1861 - ?	
José Manuel de la Reza	? - July 1861	July 1861 - ?	
Adolfo Ballivián	? - August 1861	August 1861 - ?	
Manuel Laguna	?	?	
Policarpo Eyzaguirre	? - 1863	1863	
José Vicente Dorado	1863	1863 - ?	
Lucas Mendoza de La Tapia	? - August 1864	October 1864	
Agustín Aspiazu	October 1864	1868 - ?	
Manuel José Rivera	August 1868	October 1868	
José Raimundo Taborga	? - October 1868	September 1870 - ?	
Ricardo Mujía	?	?	
Tomás Frías Ametller	? - June 1871	July 1871 - ?	President of the constituent assembly
Agustín Aspiazu	? - August 1871	September 1871 - ?	President of the constituent assembly
Mariano Reyes Cardona	? - October 1871	October 1871 - ?	President of the constituent assembly
José Manuel del Carpio	? - August 1872	September 1872	
Mariano Baptista	September 1872	October 1872	
Tomás Frías Ametller	October 1872	November 1872	
Juan de Dios Bosque	November 1872	December 1872	
José Manuel Carpio	?	1873	
Daniel Calvo Gómez	? - May 1873	May 1873	
José Manuel Rendon	May 1873	June 1873 - ?	
Genaro Palazuelos	? - October 1873	November 1873 - ?	
Belisario Salínas	? - August 1874	September 1874 - ?	
Agustín Aspiazu	? - September 1874	October 1874	
Martín Lanza	October 1874	November 1874	
Serapio Reyes Ortiz	November 1874	December 1874 - ?	
Belisario Salinas	July 1877	November 1877	
Mariano Reyes Cardona	November 1877	December 1877 - ?	
Antonio Quijarro	? - February 1878	February 1878 - ?	
Ricardo José Bustamante	? - July 1878	July 1878 - ?	
Rudecindo Carvajal	May 1880	June 1880 - ?	President of the national convention
Nataniel Aguirre	? - October 1880	October 1880	President of the national convention
Mariano Baptista	October 1880	August 1881	President of the national convention
Juan Francisco Velarde	August 1882	August 1883	
Belisario Boeto	August 1883	August 1884	
Isaac Tamayo	August 1884	August 1886	
Jenaro Sanjinés	August 1886	August 1888	
Manuel José Fernandez	August 1888	August 1889	
Jenaro Sanjinés	August 1889	August 1890	
Daniel G. Quiroga	August 1890	August 1891	
Lisandro Quiroga	August 1891	August 1892	
Joaquín Eusebio Herrero	August 1892	August 1894	
Sabino Pinilla Vargas	August 1894	August 1895	
Federico Zuazo	August 1895	August 1896	
José Santos Machicado	August 1896	August 1898	
José María Urdininea	August 1898	November 1898	
Pastor Sainz Cossío	October 1899	May 1900	President of the national convention
Belisario Salinas	May 1900	August 1900	President of the national convention
Luis Sainz	August 1900	August 1901	
Carlos V. Romero	August 1901	August 1902	
Venancio Jiménez	August 1902	August 1903	
Benedicto Goytia	August 1903	August 1904	
José Santos Quinteros	August 1904	August 1905	
Manuel Vergara	August 1905	October 1905	
Benjamin Calderón	October 1905	August 1906	
Constantino Morales	August 1906	November 1906	
Rosendo Villalobos	November 1906	August 1907	
Rafael Berthin	August 1907	December 1907	
C. Flores Quintela	December 1907	August 1908	
Angel Díez de Medina	August 1908	October 1908	
Isaac Araníbar	October 1908	August 1909	
Belisario Velasco V.	August 1909	December 1909	
Adolfo Ortega	December 1909	February 1910	
Julio Calvo	August 1910	1910 - ?	
José Carrasco Torrico	? - August 1910	September 1911 - ?	
Ricardo Cortés	? - October 1911	November 1911 - ?	
José Antezana	? - 1912	1912 - ?	
José Carrasco Torrico	? - August 1913	August 1913 - ?	
Carlos Calvo Calbimontes	1914	1915	
José Gutiérrez Guerra	? - August 1915	November 1915 - ?	
Plácido Sánchez Balcázar	? - 1916	December 1916 - ?	
José Luis Tejada Sorzano	? - August 1917	December 1917 - ?	
Abdón Saavedra	August 1918	August 1919	
Carlos Calvo Calbimontes	August 1919	February 1920 - ?	
José María Escalier	December 1920	June 1921	President of the national convention
Manuel Rigoberto Paredes Iturri	November 1921	1923	
Pedro Gutiérrez	1923	1924	
David Alvéstegui	? - November 1924	1925	
Flavio Abastoflor	? - October 1925	March 1926 - ?	
Héctor Suárez Ramos	1926	1927	
Constantino Carrión Valencia	1927	1928	
Daniel Bilbao Rioja	1928	August 1929 - ?	
Carlos Salinas Aramayo	?	17 December 1929	
Franz Tamayo	February 1931	August 1931	
Gustavo Ríos Bridoux	August 1931	August 1932	
Enrique González Duarte	August 1932	August 1933	
Franz Tamayo	August 1933	March 1935	
José Barrero	March 1935	August 1935	
Fidel Anze Soria	August 1935	May 1936	
Renato Riverin	May 1938	October 1938	President of the national convention
Rafael de Ugarte	April 1940	August 1941	
Jorge Aráoz Campero	August 1941	August 1942	
Demetrio Canelas	August 1942	August 1943	
Enrique Baldivieso	August 1943	December 1943	
Franz Tamayo	August 1944	December 1944	President of the national convention
Julián Montellano	July 1945	October 1945	President of the constitutional assembly
José Antonio Arze	March 1947	August 1947	
Antonio Landívar Ribera	August 1947	December 1948	
Alberto Salinas López	December 1948	August 1949	
Luis Ponce Lozada	August 1949	August 1950	
Lucio Lanza Solares	August 1950	November 1950	
Renán Castrillo Justiniano	August 1956	August 1957	
Juan Sanjinés Ovando	August 1957	May 1958 - ?	
Germán Quiroga Galdo	August 1958	August 1959	
Juan Sanjinés Ovando	? - September 1959	December 1959 - ?	
Ernesto Ayala Mercado	August 1960	August 1961	
Edil Sandoval Morón	August 1961	August 1962	
Jorge Flores Arías	August 1962	August 1963	
Juan Sanjinés Ovando	August 1963	November 1964	
Jorge Ríos Gamarra	August 1966	August 1968	
Franz Ondarza Linares	August 1968	August 1969	
Jorge Ríos Gamarra	August 1969	September 1969	
Lidia Gueiler Tejada	August 1979	November 1979	
José Zegarra Cerruto	November 1979	July 1980	
Samuel Gallardo Lozada	October 1982	August 1983	
Gualberto Claure Ortuño	August 1983	August 1984	
Samuel Gallardo Lozada	August 1984	August 1985	
Gastón Encinas Valverde	August 1985	August 1986	
Willy Vargas Vacaflor	August 1986	August 1988	
Walter Soriano Lea Plaza	August 1988	August 1989	
Fernando Kieffer Guzmán	August 1989	August 1991	
Gastón Encinas Valverde	August 1991	August 1993	
Guillermo Bedregal Gutiérrez	August 1993	August 1994	
Javier Campero Paz	August 1994	August 1995	
Guillermo Bedregal Gutiérrez	August 1995	August 1996	
Georg Prestel Kern	August 1996	August 1997	
Hormando Vaca Diez	August 1997	August 1998	
Hugo Arturo Carvajal Donoso	August 1998	August 2000	
Jaalil Melgar Mustafá	August 2000	August 2001	
Luis Vásquez Villamor	August 2001	August 2002	
Guido Áñez Moscoso	August 2002	August 2003	
Oscar Arrien Sandoval	August 2003	August 2004	
Mario Cossío	August 2004	August 2005	
Norah Soruco de Salvatierra	August 2005	January 2006	
Edmundo Novillo Aguilar	January 2006	January 2010	
Héctor Enrique Arcé Zaconeta	January 2010	January 2012	
Rebeca Delgado	January 2012	January 2013	
Betty Tejada	January 2013	January 2014	
Marcelo Elío Chávez	January 2014	January 2015	
Gabriela Montaño	21 January 2015	18 January 2019	
Víctor Borda	18 January 2019	14 November 2019	
Sergio Choque	14 November 2019	3 November 2020	
Freddy Mamani Laura	3 November 2020	4 November 2022	
Jerges Mercado Suárez	4 November 2022	3 November 2023	
Israel Huaytari Martínez	3 November 2023	29 October 2024	
Omar Yujra	29 October 2024	6 November 2025	
Roberto Castro Salazar	6 November 2025	Incumbent	

== See also ==
- President of the Senate of Bolivia
