= Free Bolivia Movement =

Political party in Bolivia

Free Bolivia Movement Movimiento Bolivia Libre
- Founded: 15 January 1985
- Ideology: Progressivism
- Political position: Centre-left
- Regional affiliation: COPPPAL
- Colours: Orange, Yellow

The Free Bolivia Movement (Spanish: Movimiento Bolivia Libre) is a progressive political party in Bolivia. The party was formed on 15 January 1985, following a split in MIR. Initially the party was known as MIR Bolivia Libre. At the legislative elections in 2002, the party won in alliance with the Nationalist Revolutionary Movement 26.9% of the popular vote and 36 out of 130 seats in the Chamber of Deputies and 11 out of 27 seats in the Senate.
