= Chamber of Deputies (Bolivia) =

Lower house of the Plurinational Legislative Assembly

Coordinates: 16°29′46″S 68°07′59″W

Chamber of Deputies Cámara de Diputados

Type
- Type: Lower house of the Plurinational Legislative Assembly

History
- Founded: 1831

Leadership
- President of the Chamber of Deputies: Roberto Castro Salazar, PDC since 6 November 2025

Structure
- Seats: 130
- Political groups: Government (75): PDC (49); Unity (26); Supported by (44): Libre (39); APB Súmate (5); Opposition (11): AP (8); MAS-IPSP (2); Bia Yuqui (1)

Elections
- Voting system: Two vote seat linkage compensation mixed electoral system (Mixed-member proportional representation) - the list votes are the same as votes for president and Senate elections (DSV)
- Last election: 17 August 2025
- Next election: By 2030

Meeting place
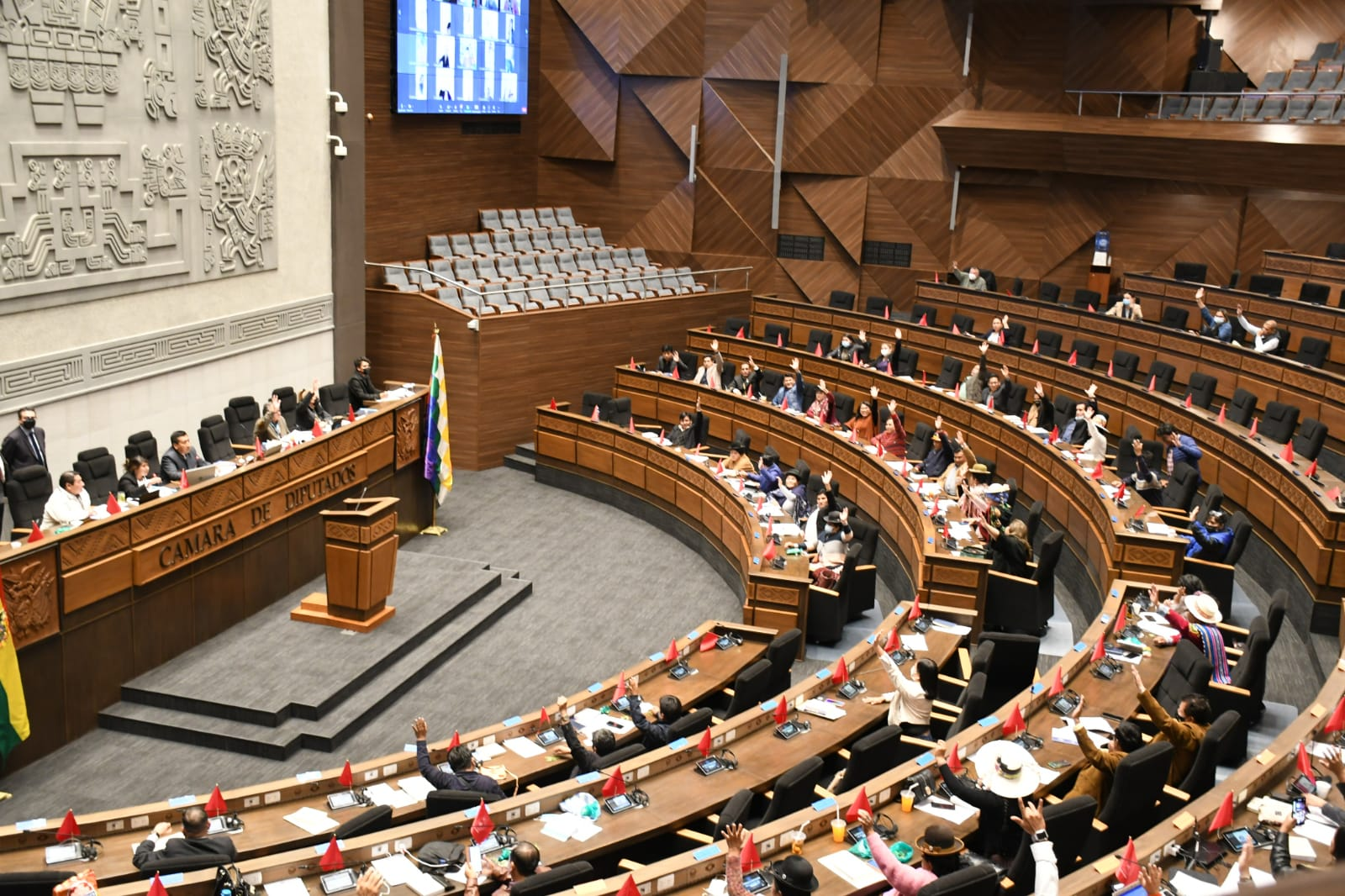
- Legislative Palace

Website
- diputados.bo

The Chamber of Deputies (Spanish: Cámara de Diputados) is the lower chamber of the Plurinational Legislative Assembly, the bicameral legislature of Bolivia. Like the upper chamber, the Senate, it meets in La Paz, the seat of government. It is an elected body consisting of 130 members and their substitutes, known as deputies.

== Deputies ==
Deputies serve five-year terms, and must be aged at least 25 on the day of the election.

=== Electoral system ===
The Chamber of Deputies comprises 130 seats (including the seven special seats), elected using a seat linkage based mixed compensatory system using a two votes: 63 deputies are elected by first-preference plurality to represent single-member electoral districts, 60 are elected by closed list party-list proportional representation from party lists on a departmental basis (in districts of varying sizes corresponding to Bolivia's nine departments with a threshold of 3%). The list seats in each region are awarded proportionally based on the vote for the presidential candidates, subtracting the number of single-member districts won (to provide mixed-member proportional representation via additional member system). The remaining seven seats are reserved indigenous seats elected by the usos y costumbres. A voter can only vote in one of either the normal constituencies or special constituencies (coexistence).

The election uses the same votes as the votes for the President and the Senate, making it a double (triple) simultaneous vote. Voters may therefore not split their ticket between these elections, but they may vote for a candidate of a different list in the election of the Chamber as the deputies from the single-member districts are elected using separate votes.

Party lists are required to alternate between men and women, and in the single-member districts, men are required to run with a female alternate, and vice versa. At least 50% of the deputies from single-member districts are required to be women.

== Elections ==
=== 2025 election ===
Party / coalition	Popular vote	%	MPs	
Party / coalition	Popular vote	%	Seats	+/–
Christian Democratic Party	1,683,891	32.15	49	▲29
Libre – Liberty and Democracy	1,397,226	26.68	39	0
Unity	1,039,426	19.85	26	▲26
Popular Alliance	439,388	8.39	8	New
Autonomy for Bolivia – Súmate	347,574	6.64	5	New
Movimiento al Socialismo	166,917	3.19	2	▼73
Force of the People	86,154	1.65	0	▼16
Liberty and Progress ADN	76,349	1.46	0	0
