= Nationalist Democratic Action =

Bolivian political party

Nationalist Democratic Action Acción Democrática Nacionalista
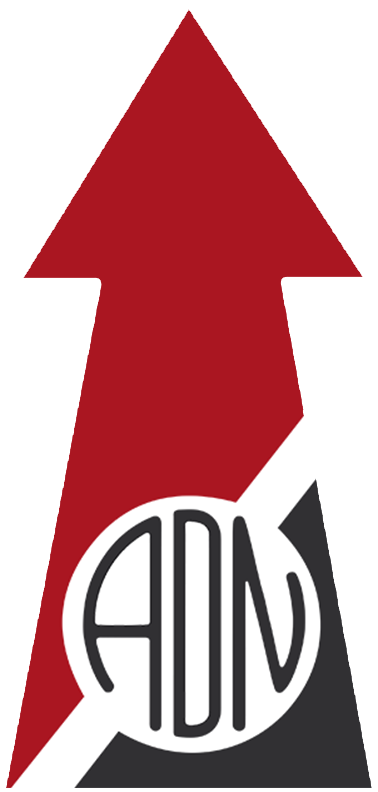
- Abbreviation: ADN
- Leader: Óscar Daza Márquez
- Founder: Hugo Banzer
- Founded: 23 March 1979
- Dissolved: 12 January 2026
- Headquarters: La Paz
- Ideology: Conservatism
- Political position: Right-wing
- National affiliation: Social Democratic Power (2005-2008)
- International affiliation: International Democrat Union (until 2001)
- Colours

Nationalist Democratic Action (Spanish: Acción Democrática Nacionalista, ADN) was a right-wing political party in Bolivia led by Óscar Daza Márquez. The ADN was founded on March 23, 1979, by the military dictator Hugo Banzer after he stepped down from power. As leader of the ADN, Banzer ran in the 1979, 1980, 1985, 1989, 1993, and 1997 presidential elections.

== History ==
Hugo Banzer obtained third place in the presidential elections of 1979 and 1980, and won a plurality of the 1985 vote, but, since he did not attain the 50% necessary for direct election, Congress selected the chief executive. Its choice was the second-place finisher, Víctor Paz Estenssoro. Banzer's party at that point opted for supporting the MNR in a coalition government. Indeed, ADN would go on to claim authorship to some of the major neoliberal economic reforms instituted by President Paz to curb galloping hyperinflation, repress labor unions, and reduce the size of the government. Banzer finished second in the 1989 elections, but supported in Congress the third-place finisher, the left-leaning Jaime Paz Zamora, who became President with ADN help. The party again governed as the main support of a ruling coalition, this time under Paz Zamora. Banzer's ADN again finished second in 1993, this time to the MNR's Gonzalo Sánchez de Lozada.

Finally, in 1997, Banzer Suárez became the constitutionally-elected President of Bolivia, at the age of 71. He was the first former dictator in Latin America's recent history to transition successfully to democratic politics and return to power by way of the ballot box. During his tenure, he launched—under the guidelines outlined by the United States—a program to fight drug-trafficking in Bolivia, which called for the eradication of coca, a controversial strategy. He also had some trouble with the unions, but nonetheless did nothing to rule in a conciliatory and non-arbitrary manner. He was diagnosed with lung cancer on June 27, 2001, and even though he had earned a five-year term (he had himself agitated to legally enlarge the presidential term) Banzer resigned on August 7, 2001. He was succeeded by his vice-president, Jorge Quiroga. Banzer's health declined rapidly thereafter, and he died on May 5, 2002.

Quiroga then became leader and heir apparent of the ADN, but when he ran for President in the 2005 elections, he did so as the candidate for a new right-of-center coalition known as Social and Democratic Power (PODEMOS), which included the bulk of Banzer's former ADN organization. His main opponent was the leftist Evo Morales of the Movement Towards Socialism. Morales won the election and Quiroga finished a distant second place, receiving 28.6% of the vote. In the mid-2000s, it appeared that ADN has become a defunct former party, replaced by Quiroga's new PODEMOS organization, although its structures, ideology, and supporters remained basically the same. However, as of 2015, it was still a legal political party in Bolivia.

== Election results ==
=== Presidential elections ===
Election	Presidential nominee	Votes	%	Votes	%	Result
Election	Presidential nominee	First round		Second round		Result
1979	Hugo Banzer	218,857	14.89%	22 (Note: After no candidate won more than 50% of the vote in the general election, the National Congress was required to elect the president in an indirect second round.)	15.28%	Lost ✗
1980	Hugo Banzer	220,309	16.83%	29	18.47%	Lost ✗
1985	Hugo Banzer	493,735	32.83%	51	35.17%	Lost ✗
1989	Hugo Banzer	357,298	25.24%			Lost ✗
1993	Hugo Banzer	346,865	21.05%			Lost ✗
1997	Hugo Banzer	484,705	22.26%	118	79.73%	Elected ✓
2002	Ronald MacLean Abaroa	94,386	3.40%			Lost ✗
2005	Jorge Quiroga	821,745	28.59%			Lost ✗
2009	Did not contest					
2014	Did not contest					
2019	Did not contest					
2020	Did not contest					
2025	Pavel Aracena	77,576	1.45%			Lost ✗

=== Chamber of Deputies and Senate elections ===
Election	Party leader	Votes	%	Chamber seats	+/-	Position	Senate seats	+/-	Position	Status
1979	Hugo Banzer	218,857	14.89%	19 / 117	New	▲3rd	3 / 27	New	▲3rd	Opposition
1980	Hugo Banzer	220,309	16.83%	24 / 130	▲5	3rd	6 / 27	▲3	3rd	Opposition
1985	Hugo Banzer	493,735	32.83%	41 / 130	▲17	▲2nd	10 / 27	▲3	▲2nd	Coalition
1989	Hugo Banzer	357,298	25.24%	38 / 130	▼3	2nd	8 / 27	▼2	▼3rd	Coalition
1993	Hugo Banzer	As part of AP		35 / 130	▼3	2nd	8 / 27	0	▲2nd	Opposition
1997	Hugo Banzer	In coalition with PDC and NFR		32 / 130	▼3	▲1st	11 / 27	▲3	▲1st	Coalition
2002	Jorge Quiroga	94,386	3.40%	4 / 130	▼28	▼7th	0 / 27	▼11	▼7th	Opposition
2005	Jorge Quiroga	As part of PODEMOS		43 / 130	▲39	▲2nd	16 / 27	▲16	▲2nd	Opposition
2009	Did not contest			0 / 130	▼43	—N/a	0 / 27	▼16	—N/a	Extra-parliamentary
2014	Did not contest			0 / 130	0	—N/a	0 / 36	0	—N/a	Extra-parliamentary
2019	Did not contest			0 / 130	0	—N/a	0 / 36	0	—N/a	Annulled
2020	Did not contest			0 / 130	0	—N/a	0 / 36	0	—N/a	Extra-parliamentary
2025	Gabriel Gutiérrez	As part of LyP		0 / 130	0	▲7th	0 / 36	0	▲5th	Extra-parliamentary
