= Conscience of Fatherland =

Political party in Bolivia

Conscience of Fatherland Conciencia de Patria
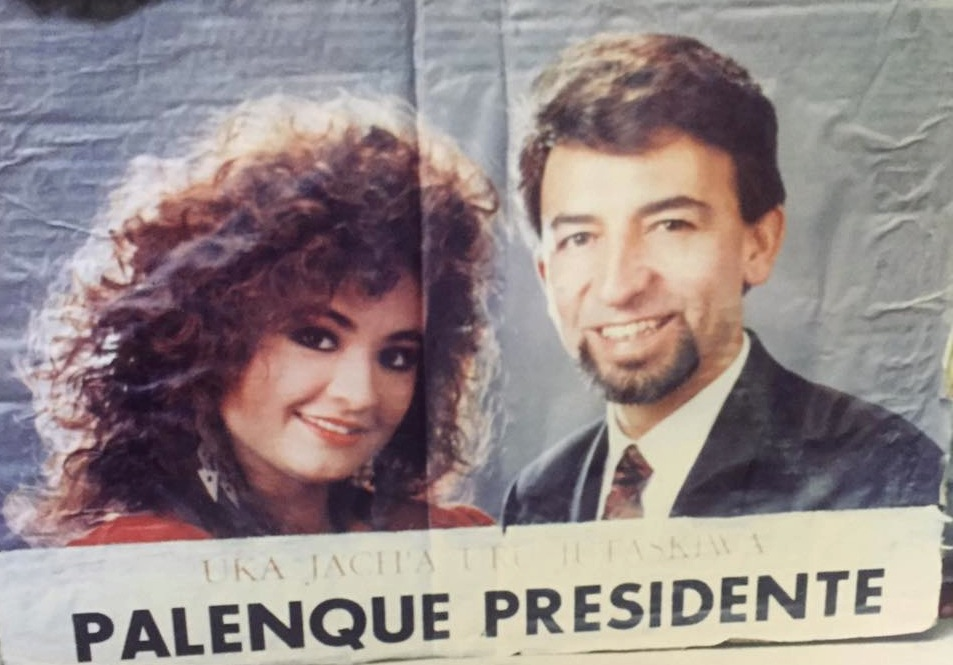
- 1997 campaign poster
- Abbreviation: CONDEPA
- Leader: Carlos Palenque
- Founded: 21 September 1988
- Dissolved: 2002
- Headquarters: La Paz
- Ideology: Left-wing populism; Indigenismo
- Political position: Left-wing
- Chamber of Deputies (1997): 19 / 130
- Chamber of Senators (1997): 3 / 27

Conscience of the Fatherland (Spanish: Conciencia de Patria, abbreviated CONDEPA) was a populist political party in Bolivia in the late 20th and early 21st centuries. The party was led by Carlos Palenque.

== Goals ==
CONDEPA was founded in Tiwanaku on September 21, 1988. The party was primarily based in the La Paz Department.

CONDEPA was the first major party in Bolivia that appealed to the cultural identity of the Aymaras, the indigenous majority of the country. It borrowed katarista symbols and used the wiphala flag. Palenque often used references to Aymara culture in his campaigns.

== Election history ==
The party won strong support amongst urban poor, amongst Aymaras that had migrated to the urban centres.

CONDEPA lost the mayoral post of La Paz in 1995.

At the time of the 1999 elections the CONDEPA was a party in crisis. It was discredited by having entered into Hugo Banzer's government. The party had suffered the death of its leader Carlos Palenque, and divisions had erupted amongst his successors. Moreover, the influence of the mass media connected to the party had decreased significantly. As the party lost the municipal contest in El Alto in these elections, it lost its last remaining political stronghold in the country.

Ahead of the 2002 general election, CONDEPA launched Nicolás Valdivia as its presidential candidate and Esperanza Huanca as vice-presidential candidate. CONDEPA lost all of its 22 seats in the Congress of Bolivia in the elections. The implosion of CONDEPA enabled the nascent Movement for Socialism to gain a wide following amongst indigenous urban poor. CONDEPA-Patriotic Movement lost its registration at the National Electoral Court shortly after the 2002 election.

== See also ==
- List of political parties in Bolivia
