= Rebeca Delgado =

Bolivian politician (born 1966)

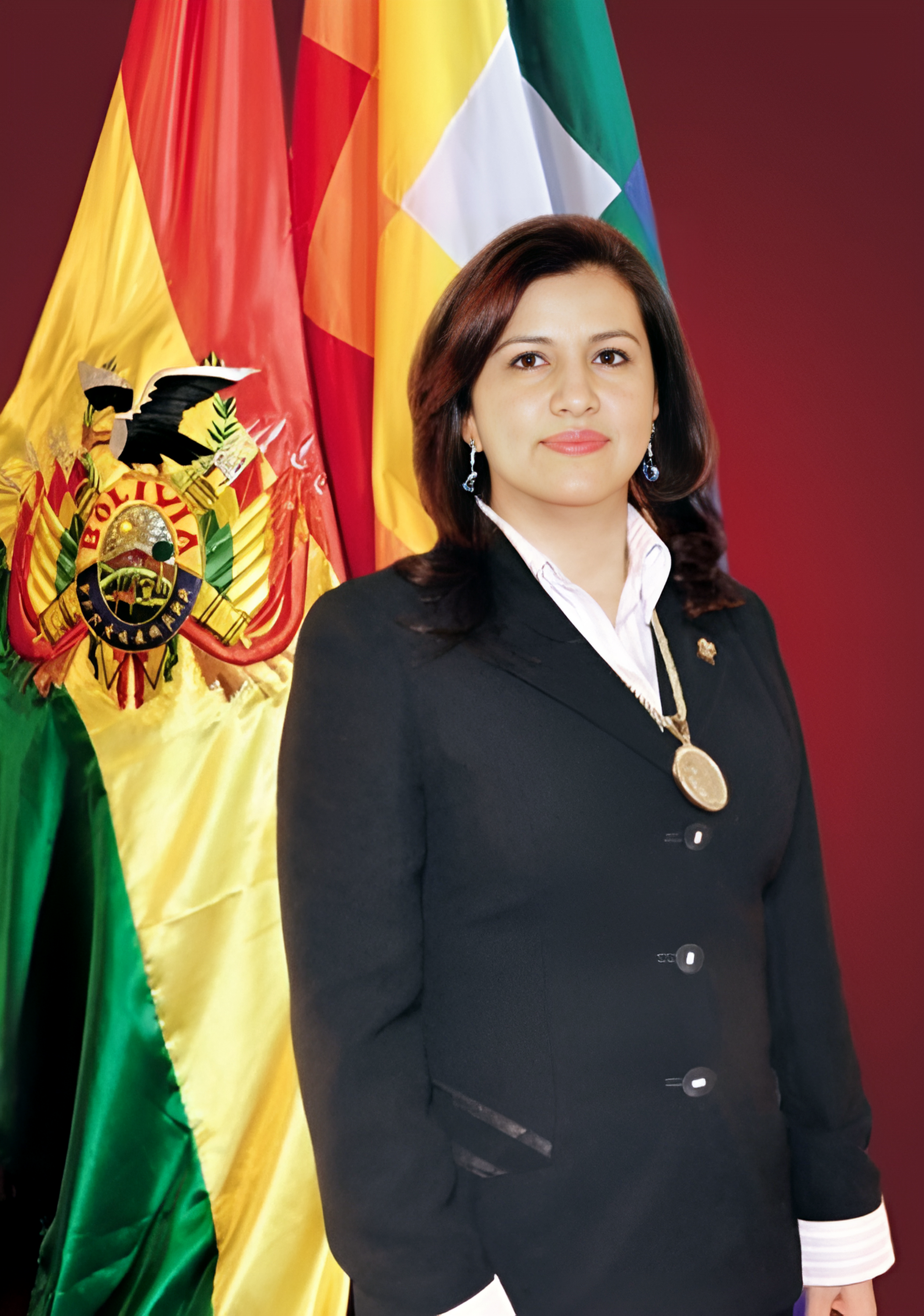
- Official portrait, 2012

President of the Chamber of Deputies
- In office 20 January 2012 – 18 January 2013
- Preceded by: Héctor Arce
- Succeeded by: Betty Tejada

Member of the Chamber of Deputies from Cochabamba
- In office 19 January 2010 – 16 December 2014
- Substitute: Samuel Pereira
- Preceded by: Sabina Orellana
- Succeeded by: Romina Pérez
- Constituency: Party list

Vice Minister of Government Coordination
- In office 16 June 2008 – 23 April 2009
- President: Evo Morales
- Minister: Juan Ramón Quintana
- Preceded by: Héctor Arce
- Succeeded by: Martín Burgoa (acting)

Constituent of the Constituent Assembly from Cochabamba
- In office 6 August 2006 – 14 December 2007
- Constituency: Party list

Personal details
- Born: Rebeca Elvira Delgado Burgoa; 1 June 1966 (age 60) La Paz, Bolivia
- Party: Freedom of Thought for Bolivia (2014–2015)
- Other political affiliations: Movement for Socialism (2006–2013)
- Education: Higher University of San Simón
- Occupation: Educator; lawyer; magistrate; politician

Rebeca Elvira Delgado Burgoa (born 1 June 1966) is a Bolivian academic, lawyer, magistrate, and politician who served as president of the Chamber of Deputies from 2012 to 2013. As a member of the Movement for Socialism, she served as a party-list member of the Chamber of Deputies from Cochabamba from 2010 to 2014. Prior to her election to the lower chamber, Delgado served as a party-list member of the Constituent Assembly from Cochabamba from 2006 to 2007 and was vice minister of government coordination from 2008 to 2009. Delgado's near-decade-long political and legislative tenure was preceded by a fifteen-year career as a public servant, during which time she worked as a public defender and examining magistrate, was a magistrate on the Departmental Electoral Court of Cochabamba, and served as the Ombudsman's Office's delegate for the fight against corruption in Cochabamba.

Born in La Paz and raised in Cochabamba, Delgado graduated as a lawyer at the Higher University of San Simón. She ventured into public activity through the field of human rights, supporting the Departmental Human Rights Assembly during her days as a law student. She worked as coordinator for public defense in Cochabamba and as an examining magistrate before being selected to serve on the department's Departmental Electoral Court, part of the first group of women to hold seats on the bench. Delgado became politically involved during the first government of Evo Morales when she was invited to run for a seat in the Constituent Assembly, tasked with drafting the country's current Constitution. She continued in public administration following the assembly's closure, serving as presidential delegate in Cochabamba, vice minister of government coordination, and head of the Departmental Coordinator of Autonomies.

In 2009, Delgado was elected to represent Cochabamba in the Chamber of Deputies, and was elected to the presidency of the lower chamber in 2012. Delgado's tenure saw a deterioration in relations between herself and the administration due to her willingness to challenge executive interference in legislative matters, briefly upending the subservient role the legislature had begun to take starting from Morales's second term. Delgado was not reelected to the presidency and spent the remainder of her term as persona non grata within her own party, assuming leadership over a nascent group of "freethinkers" that defected from the ruling party in the latter years of the 1st Plurinational Legislative Assembly. In late 2014, she launched a bid for the Cochabamba mayoralty on behalf of her own party, Freedom of Thought for Bolivia. However, her candidacy was disqualified due to a controversial judicial ruling that barred most outgoing legislators from running for local public office. Delgado took her grievance to the United Nations, which in 2018 ruled that the government had violated her civil and political rights.

== Early life and career ==
Rebeca Delgado was born on 1 June 1966 in La Paz to Alfredo Delgado and Rebeca Burgoa. Delgado's mother was raised in Charazani, the cultural center of the Kallawaya, an itinerant group native to the Saavedra Province. Her father was the son of a local landlord from the rural town of Pumujri in the adjoining Camacho Province. Orphaned as a child, Alfredo Delgado spent much of his youth in the care of the area's Kallawaya community, to whom he later bequeathed his inherited land titles in gratitude. Her parents' rural roots led Delgado to heavily identify with Kallawaya culture as a child, with the family often returning to vacation in Pumujri, where she participated in indigenous festivities and traditions.

Delgado concluded her primary studies in La Paz before moving with her family to Cochabamba, where she attended the city's Catholic Handmaids institute. She studied law at the Higher University of San Simón, graduating with a master's in criminal science and a diploma in higher education with a specialization in human rights. During her time in university, Delgado made her first forays into the public sector, serving as a volunteer member of the Departmental Human Rights Assembly's legal commission. Upon graduating, she briefly worked as a university professor at the Bolivian Catholic University and the Bolivian Private University before moving on to serve as coordinator for public defense of Cochabamba, her first official public function. It was while exercising this position in the 1990s that Delgado first became acquainted with cocalero activist Evo Morales when she was assigned to assume the defense of the region's coca growers.

In the ensuing years, Delgado worked as an examining magistrate and was an active member of several women's organizations. In 1991, during the period of judicial reform spearheaded by René Blattmann—which for the first time prioritized the appointment of impartial professionals over fulfilling partisan quotas—Delgado was nominated by these women's organization to serve as a magistrate on Cochabamba's Departmental Electoral Court. The hard-fought push for women's representation in the judiciary meant that not only was Delgado part of the first group of women to serve on the court, but the body actually held a female majority. Upon the conclusion of her term, Delgado was appointed to work for the Ombudsman's Office as its delegate for the fight against corruption in Cochabamba.

== Constituent Assembly ==
=== Election ===
Throughout her fifteen years of public service, Delgado remained on the sidelines of partisan politics, a situation that changed in late 2005, when her name was put forward by several women's organizations as a potential candidate for a seat in the newly-formed Constituent Assembly on behalf of the Movement for Socialism (MAS-IPSP). Delgado received the formal invitation in 2006, accepted, and was elected on the MAS's party list in that year's constituent elections. The postulation of retired former magistrates to contest elective office was a not uncommon tactic among political parties of the day, taking advantage of the good public image individuals like Delgado had accrued as impartial arbiters of the law.

=== Tenure ===
As a constituent, Delgado chaired the assembly's Justice Commission, applying her legal knowledge to the process of writing and drafting articles in the new Constitution related to judicial matters. Of particular note was the decision to open up the designation of the country's highest judicial officials to popular vote, with candidates pre-selected by the Legislative Assembly. Though intended to alleviate the crisis of judicial independence the country faced at the time, Delgado later lamented that the legislature's ability to pre-select candidates made the judiciary subject to the whims of "buddies and friends" in the Legislative Assembly. Years later, she called for amendments to the Constitution allowing for popular participation in the pre-selection of judicial candidates. Regardless of its shortfalls, Delgado regarded her term in the Constituent Assembly as her "strongest political moment and proof of political commitment".

== Government official ==
Half a year after the closure of the Constituent Assembly, Delgado was appointed to serve as the government's presidential delegate in Cochabamba, charged with coordinating government actions with the region's social sectors. Added to this was the mission of acting as a liaison between executive and departmental authorities, a task of particular import when managing relations between the government and opposition-led regions like Cochabamba. Delgado's prominent position as a regional authority led President Morales to consider appointing her as the department's acting prefect in replacement of Manfred Reyes Villa, whom voters had recently recalled. For a while, she remained the president's preferred pick among a crowded field of possible candidates and was one of the final two contenders for the position, together with David Herrera, who enjoyed the support of the department's social movements. Ultimately, however, neither were chosen, with Morales instead designating Rafael Puente to hold the post.

Just a month after being sworn in as a presidential delegate, Delgado was reassigned to head the Vice Ministry of Government Coordination. In her service as vice minister, Delgado assisted in drafting and elaborating supreme decrees issued by the executive branch, contributed to the process of implementing the new Constitution, and successfully developed a system for monitoring the performance of public management. In April 2009, having spent the past two years in public administration, Delgado resigned and returned to Cochabamba to focus on her family. She was quickly substituted by Martín Burgoa, who served in an acting capacity until Wilfredo Chávez was appointed as Delgado's permanent replacement in May. The following month, Delgado returned to public service in a more localized role, being appointed to head the Departmental Coordinator of Autonomies of Cochabamba, a position focused on developing the department's newly granted political autonomy, including drafting its autonomous statute.

== Chamber of Deputies ==
=== Election ===
A month and a half into her new position, Delgado was informed that the MAS's departmental directorate, together with local social organizations, had agreed to nominate her as a candidate in that year's general elections. She topped the MAS's party list in Cochabamba and was elected to represent the department in the Chamber of Deputies, becoming one of roughly a tenth of former constituents who continued national political careers following the conclusion of their terms in the Constituent Assembly.

=== Tenure ===
Entering parliament, Delgado was selected to serve as chair of the MAS caucus in the Chamber of Deputies, a decision in line with Morales's stated gender equity criteria for leadership positions. She continued as the MAS's standard-bearer in the lower chamber for half a year before unexpectedly resigning at the end of May, citing coordination issues with the body's president, Héctor Arce. The primary highlight of Delgado's early term was in the international sphere, where she served as vice president and later president of the Andean Parliament, the first Bolivian woman to assume either position. Her presidency focused on combating the illicit drug trade in the region and restructuring the Andean Integration System in support of the more than ten million migrants from Andean Community member states residing in the United States and European Union.

==== President of the Chamber of Deputies ====
In January 2012, the MAS's Cochabamba caucus presented Delgado as their nominee for the presidency of the Chamber of Deputies, challenging incumbent Héctor Arce for the post. After a prolonged period of arduous debate lasting several hours, the broader MAS caucus in the Chamber of Deputies designated Delgado to succeed Arce as the body's president. She defeated the two-term incumbent by a margin of twenty-five votes, owing to Arce's lack of support among multiple departmental caucuses. Delgado was sworn in on 20 January, in tandem with the inauguration of Gabriela Montaño as president of the Senate. Their shared term holds the distinction of being the first time in Bolivian history that both chambers of the Legislative Assembly were simultaneously presided by women.

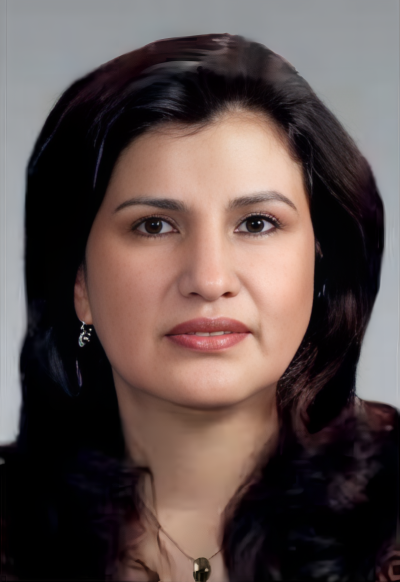
Official portrait, 2014

Delgado's presidency prioritized the passage of laws benefiting the most marginalized sectors of society. Her tenure saw the Chamber of Deputies approve legislation aimed at guaranteeing equal conditions for disabled persons and combating human trafficking, and though she opposed the legal recognition of same-sex marriage, viewing it as contravening the Constitution, she did not rule out the possibility of regulating civil unions and division of property. In April, the chamber unanimously passed the Law Against Harassment and Political Violence Against Women, a historic piece of legislation seeking to guarantee the free exercise of women's political rights.

Regarding longstanding accusations of legislative "submission" before the executive branch, Delgado rebutted that many bills sent by the president and his team often saw up to eighty percent of their text amended and modified before final approval by the chamber. Delgado's relative willingness to challenge executive interference sparked controversy late into the year following disagreements over an asset forfeiture bill. The legislation, drafted by Minister of Government Carlos Romero, sought to expand the government's ability to seize and sell off illicitly-acquired property. Though constitutional experts expressed concern over the bill's perceived infringement on the right to property, the government nonetheless demanded that the legislature pass it without modifications. Despite approval from the Senate, the bill stalled in the Chamber of Deputies, with Delgado stating that some sixty percent of the law's text would have to be modified for constitutionality. The ensuing public spat continued through the month, with Delgado calling on Romero to exercise more responsibility when drafting laws. Romero, in turn, lambasted Delgado for having "[never] developed a serious proposal in her life", asserting that he would not argue with a person he considered politically and academically beneath him. Ultimately, President Morales ordered the bill's withdrawal from parliament, announcing his intent to present it before the Plurinational Constitutional Court for review. (Note: In 2013, the court found seven articles of the bill unconstitutional. Delgado highlighted her vindication but considered that the entire bill should have been thrown out to allow for the elaboration of a new law.)

Delgado's much-publicized face-off with the minister of government soured relations between herself and the executive branch, and though some groups within the MAS and the opposition expressed support for her continuation as president, the political damage done proved insurmountable. Early into the new year, Morales expressed discontent with the "many problems" Delgado's presidency had brought, pointing out that compared to Arce's prior terms, Delgado's tenure was "[the] first time there was disconnect between the executive branch and the legislative branch". Vice President Álvaro García Linera was more explicit, commenting that if individuals like Delgado wanted to be "freethinkers", they could leave the party. Having lost the confidence of party leaders, the Cochabamba caucus opted not to nominate Delgado for a second term, and she was replaced by Betty Tejada as president of the Chamber of Deputies. Delgado's status as persona non grata within her own party continued beyond her failure to be reelected to the presidency. In its yearly reallocation of legislative positions, Delgado found herself left out of any and all of the chamber's commissions and committees, and her participation in party meetings was limited only to those held by her own departmental caucus, a situation she described as punishment for thinking freely. In his analysis of Delgado's post-presidency prospects, analyst Marcelo Silva stated she had been effectively relegated to "the MAS's freezer".

==== Defection from the MAS ====
For the remaining two years of her term, Delgado assumed a markedly antagonistic position in relation to the ruling party. She became a leading advocate of the "freethinkers", a faction of MAS defectors that criticized the ruling party's methods and practices without breaking with the government's left-wing ideological position nor aligning with the conservative opposition. This small but not insignificant group grew steadily in the closing years of the Legislative Assembly, including among its ranks at least ten deputies and some senators. Though never able to break the MAS majority in either legislative chamber, Delgado's movement was able to tip the scales in the Chamber of Deputies, where the ruling party lost its supermajority. (Note: Apart from the preexisting elected opposition led by National Convergence with thirty-seven deputies, followed by the National Unity Front with three and the Social Alliance at two, the MAS had also lost the support of several legislators from the Fearless Movement and the caucus of indigenous deputies, both of whom entered parliament with the ruling party before breaking with it for various reasons.) It thus also lost the ability to make decisions that necessitated the support of two-thirds of both chambers. By that point, however, analysts noted that so late into the Legislative Assembly's term, major decisions requiring two-thirds majority, such as appointing officials and constitutional reforms, were unlikely, reducing the significance of the opposition's achievement.

In late 2013, Delgado's group signed an agreement with the National Council of Ayllus and Markas of Qullasuyu (CONAMAQ) to promote legislation supporting Bolivia's indigenous population. Later that year, CONAMAQ secured an alliance with the Green Party (PVB-IEP) to support Rafael Quispe as a candidate for the presidency in the 2014 general election. Following the announcement, Quispe expressed interest in expanding CONAMAQ's existing pact with Delgado's bloc to include them in the new coalition. The MAS dissidents, however, pronounced their discomfort with the idea of moving forward with Quispe as a candidate, instead lobbying for Delgado to head the PVB's ticket. Ultimately, internal disputes over the coalition's presidential ballot forced Delgado to seek different political partners. She found them in Juan del Granado's Fearless Movement (MSM), with whom her bloc—now organized into the Freedom of Thought for Bolivia (LPB)—signed an electoral pact. Following the agreement, Delgado was invited to accompany del Granado as his running mate; however, she rejected the offer, stating that her aim was establishing a long-term alternative progressive political project for the country, not seeking a candidacy. Delgado also declined to seek another term in the Legislative Assembly, preferring to work towards consolidating a candidacy in Cochabamba at the municipal or departmental level.

== Later career and retirement ==
The MSM's disappointing electoral performance, garnering less than three percent of the national popular vote, lost the party its legal status, leaving it unable to contest the 2015 regional elections. By that point, Delgado had already distanced herself from the party's electoral campaign, stating that a lack of coordination and mutual mistrust between herself and del Granado had harmed their ability to develop a shared political project. As a result, by September, Delgado had already shifted her focus toward consolidating LPB's legal status. Following the October general elections, Delgado moved forward with announcing her bid for the Cochabamba mayoralty, resigning her seat in the Legislative Assembly to focus on the race. With the MSM out of the running and LPB still lacking legal status, (Note: The Departmental Electoral Tribunal of Cochabamba eventually granted LPB legal status in December, days after Delgado had already consolidated an alternative electoral alliance.) Delgado turned to other fronts to sponsor her candidacy. She eventually reached an agreement with the opposition National Unity Front (UN) alongside the Revolutionary Left Front (FRI) and Solidarity Civic Unity (UCS) to form the United for Cochabamba (UNICO) alliance. With that, Delgado quickly emerged as the favorite in the polls to become Cochabamba's next municipal mayor.

That all came crashing down in December when the Supreme Electoral Tribunal (TSE) issued Circular 071/2014, a controversial ruling that barred nearly all legislators from the outgoing assembly from running in the 2015 elections. The electoral court argued that for the last two years, the primary residence of these individuals had been the seat of government in La Paz and not their respective regions, contravening the Constitution's residency requirements for candidates. According to sociologist Salvador Romero: "above all, this measure affected candidates who had broken with the MAS and were running for local office; it joined [other] controversial rulings that ... discredited the TSE for its [apparent] bias in favor of the ruling party". In January, the TSE disqualified Delgado's candidacy, along with those of other prominent MAS defectors Eduardo Maldonado, Ever Moya, and Edwin Tupa, all of whom had been running for the mayoralty of their respective department's capital cities.

In response to her disqualification, Delgado filed a lawsuit against the government before the United Nations Human Rights Committee. The case Delgado v. Bolivia was closed in 2018, with the international body ruling in favor of Delgado, stating that the Bolivian government had violated her civil and political rights, for which it was ordered to pay "adequate compensation", including legal expenses at the national and international level. In addition, the court ruled that Bolivia, as a signatory of the International Covenant on Civil and Political Rights, "has the obligation to adopt the necessary measures to prevent similar violations from being committed in the future", thus expressly prohibiting the government from ever issuing a resolution similar to the TSE's 2014 circular. For Delgado, the precedent set was "the most important thing", though, in the ensuing years, she continued to fight to receive economic damages owed, even as the government asserted that that section of the UN's ruling was "eminently recommendatory". Beyond that, Delgado retired from partisan political life, returning to her origins as an academic.

== Electoral history ==
Electoral history of Rebeca Delgado
Year	Office	Party	Alliance	Votes			Result	Ref.
Year	Office	Party	Alliance	Total	%	P.	Result	Ref.
2006	Constituent	Movement for Socialism	None	286,143	60.37%	1st	Won	(Note: Presented on an electoral list. The data shown represents the share of the vote the entire party/alliance received in that constituency.)
2009	Deputy	Movement for Socialism	None	569,237	68.82%	1st	Won	
2015	Mayor	Freedom of Thought	United for Cochabamba	Disqualified			Lost	
Source: Plurinational Electoral Organ | Electoral Atlas

== Publications ==
- Delgado, Rebeca; et al. (2010). Chivi, Idón (ed.). Bolivia, Nueva Constitución Política del Estado: Conceptos Elementales para su Desarrollo Normativo (in Spanish). La Paz: Vicepresidencia del Estado Plurinacional de Bolivia. ISBN 978-99954-735-6-3. OCLC 713917995.

Bolivian Constituent Assembly
Seat established	Constituent of the Constituent Assembly from Cochabamba; 2006–2007	Seat dissolved
Government offices
Preceded by Katia Gumucio	Presidential Delegate for Cochabamba; 2008	Succeeded by Rafael Puente
Preceded by Héctor Arce	Vice Minister of Government Coordination; 2008–2009	Succeeded by Martín Burgoa; Acting
Chamber of Deputies of Bolivia
Preceded by Sabina Orellana	Member of the Chamber of Deputies from Cochabamba; 2010–2014	Succeeded by Romina Pérez
Preceded by César Navarro	Leader of the Chamber of Deputies; Movement for Socialism Caucus; 2010	Succeeded by Emeliana Aiza
Preceded by Héctor Arce	President of the Chamber of Deputies; 2012–2013	Succeeded by Betty Tejada
Diplomatic posts
Preceded by Wilbert Bendezú	President of the Andean Parliament; 2011–2012	Succeeded by Héctor Helí Rojas
