= Marcela Revollo =

Bolivian politician (born 1964)

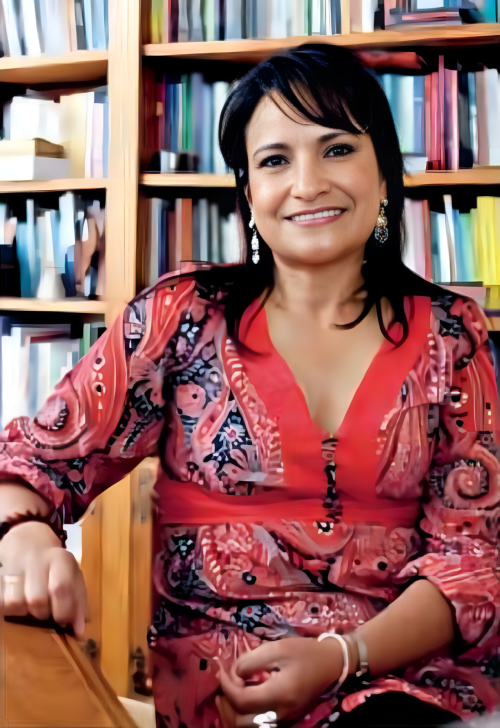
- Official portrait, 2010

Member of the Chamber of Deputies from La Paz circumscription 10
- In office 19 January 2010 – 18 January 2015
- Substitute: José Ángel Callao
- Preceded by: Javier Bejarano
- Succeeded by: Sonia Brito (Note: Redistribution; circumscription 8.)
- Constituency: La Paz

Constituent of the Constituent Assembly from La Paz
- In office 6 August 2006 – 14 December 2007
- Constituency: Party list

Personal details
- Born: Miriam Marcela Revollo Quiroga; 18 July 1964 (age 62) Cochabamba, Bolivia
- Party: Fearless Movement (1999–2014)
- Other political affiliations: Revolutionary Left Movement – Mass Front (1984–1990)
- Spouse: Juan del Granado (m. 1989)
- Education: Higher University of San Simón; Higher University of San Andrés
- Occupation: Educator; politician; sociologist

Miriam Marcela Revollo Quiroga (born 18 July 1964) is a Bolivian academic, politician, and sociologist who served as a member of the Chamber of Deputies from La Paz, representing circumscription 10 from 2010 to 2015. Though Revollo's political career is closely linked to that of her husband, longtime La Paz Mayor Juan del Granado, her political origins are independent of marriage. A graduate of the higher universities of San Simón and San Andrés, Revollo entered political life as an activist in the student movement and was a steadfast advocate for the inclusion of women in the country's democratic process. Together with her husband, she founded the Fearless Movement, with which she was elected as a party-list member of the Constituent Assembly from La Paz from 2006 to 2007. As a parliamentarian, she continued to work toward the advancement of women's causes, largely supporting the social policies enacted by the ruling Movement for Socialism, even as she simultaneously criticized many of the administration's illiberal practices.

== Early life and career ==
Marcela Revollo was born on 18 July 1964 in Cochabamba to Carlos Revollo and Esther Quiroga. She graduated with a bachelor's degree in sociology from the Higher University of San Simón before moving to La Paz to attend the Higher University of San Andrés, where she completed a master's in political science and a doctorate in developmental science. Revollo became involved in political life from the age of 17 as an activist in the student movement, aligned with the broader left-wing currents that protagonized the tail end of the country's transition from dictatorship to democracy. She joined the Revolutionary Left Movement – Mass Front (MIR-MASAS), a far-left splinter group of the larger Revolutionary Left Movement (MIR). As a member of this organization, Revollo—then 22 years old—became acquainted with Juan del Granado, a recognized political leader within the MIR-MASAS and, at the time, the lead prosecutor in the trial of responsibilities against the ousted dictator Luis García Meza. The two were wed three years later and had two children: Gabriela and Andrés.

In the ensuing years, Revollo devoted herself to teaching and research, combining left-wing ideals with feminist theories, focusing on women's rights and combatting gender violence. In the political field, these concepts developed into the demand for a female quota on party lists and legal sanctions for gender-based political violence. To promote these causes, she worked in tandem with both international agencies and local consultancies contracted by the State. Regarding the latter instance, the work of many governments of the time in opening up their agendas to the demands of progressive groups allowed left-wing intellectuals like Revollo to participate in statecraft despite their more critical view toward other government policies, such as their neoliberal economic orientations.

== Political career ==
Revollo's political career was closely linked to that of her husband, del Granado, who, after achieving the conviction of García Meza, went on to serve in the Chamber of Deputies before being elected mayor of La Paz in 1999. Together with del Granado, Revollo was a founding member of the Fearless Movement (MSM), with which her husband governed the capital for over a decade. Starting from the 2005 elections, the MSM entered an electoral pact with the Movement for Socialism (MAS-IPSP), through which many of the party's leaders attained elective positions in Congress and the Constituent Assembly. Among them was Revollo, who in 2006 was elected on the MAS party list to represent La Paz in the Constituent Assembly.

Revollo repeated the victory in 2009 when she was nominated to run for a seat in the Chamber of Deputies. As part of its shared alliance with the MAS, candidacies in the middle and upper-class districts encompassing the city of La Paz were reserved for members of the MSM, a party that enjoyed greater support among the city's urban population. Revollo won handily in circumscription 10, a district del Granado had represented years prior. Once in the Legislative Assembly, the alliance between the MAS and MSM quickly collapsed as a result of the former's decision to contest the 2010 municipal elections alone. From parliament, Revollo took charge of the small group of MSM deputies elected for the 2010–2015 term, establishing a breakaway opposition caucus in the Chamber of Deputies, for which the ruling party sought her removal from office for violating the legislature's anti-defection statutes. Revollo, for her part, challenged the MAS to call a recall referendum to define whether she and her colleagues should lose their seats. Ultimately, the chamber's Ethics Commission ruled against sanctioning Revollo for political defection on technical grounds.

For the duration of her term, Revollo took a pragmatic approach to legislating, supporting the MAS's social project, including making important contributions to legislation in favor of women and the environment, even as she simultaneously criticized the ruling party for its illiberal practices. Although the MSM ran its own slate of candidates for the 2014 general election, Revollo opted not to seek reelection as a parliamentarian. Following the MSM's electoral defeat and subsequent loss of its legal status, both del Granado and Revollo retired from politics, with the latter returning to postgraduate teaching at the Higher University of San Andrés.

== Electoral history ==
Electoral history of Marcela Revollo
Year	Office	Party	Alliance	Votes			Result	Ref.
Year	Office	Party	Alliance	Total	%	P.	Result	Ref.
2006	Constituent	Fearless Movement	Movement for Socialism	558,886	63.82%	1st	Won	(Note: Presented on an electoral list. The data shown represents the share of the vote the entire party/alliance received in that constituency.)
2009	Deputy	Fearless Movement	Movement for Socialism	49,078	57.45%	1st	Won	
Source: Plurinational Electoral Organ | Electoral Atlas

== Publications ==
- Revollo Quiroga, Marcela; Dávila Torres, Amanda; Ascarrunz Seoane, Beatriz (1994). Las Cifras de la Violencia: Violencia Doméstica Registrada en Cochabamba (in Spanish). La Paz: Subsecretaría de Asuntos de Género. OCLC 37665141.
- ———————————; Ascarrunz Seoane, Beatriz (1994). Las Cifras de la Violencia: Violencia Doméstica Registrada en La Paz (in Spanish). La Paz: Subsecretaría de Asuntos de Género. OCLC 35193904.
- ——————————— (1995). Las Cifras de la Violencia: Violencia Doméstica Registrada en Bolivia (IVR-Mujer) (in Spanish). La Paz: Subsecretaría de Asuntos de Género. OCLC 35701456.
- ——————————— (1996). Los Jueces y la Sana Crítica, una Visión de Género: Juzgamiento en Familia (in Spanish). La Paz: Subsecretaría de Asuntos de Género. OCLC 40552567.
- ——————————— (1996). Mujer, Costumbre y Violencia en la Ciudad de El Alto (in Spanish). La Paz: Centro de Información y Desarrollo de la Mujer. OCLC 37510865.
- ——————————— (2001). Mujeres bajo Prueba: La Participación Electoral de las Mujeres antes del Voto Universal (1938–1949) (in Spanish). La Paz: Eureka Ediciones. OCLC 51544228.

Bolivian Constituent Assembly
Seat established	Constituent of the Constituent Assembly from La Paz; 2006–2007	Seat dissolved
Chamber of Deputies of Bolivia
Preceded by Javier Bejarano	Member of the Chamber of Deputies from La Paz circumscription 10; 2010–2015	Succeeded by Sonia Brito
