= Gardenia Arauz =

Bolivian politician (born 1972)

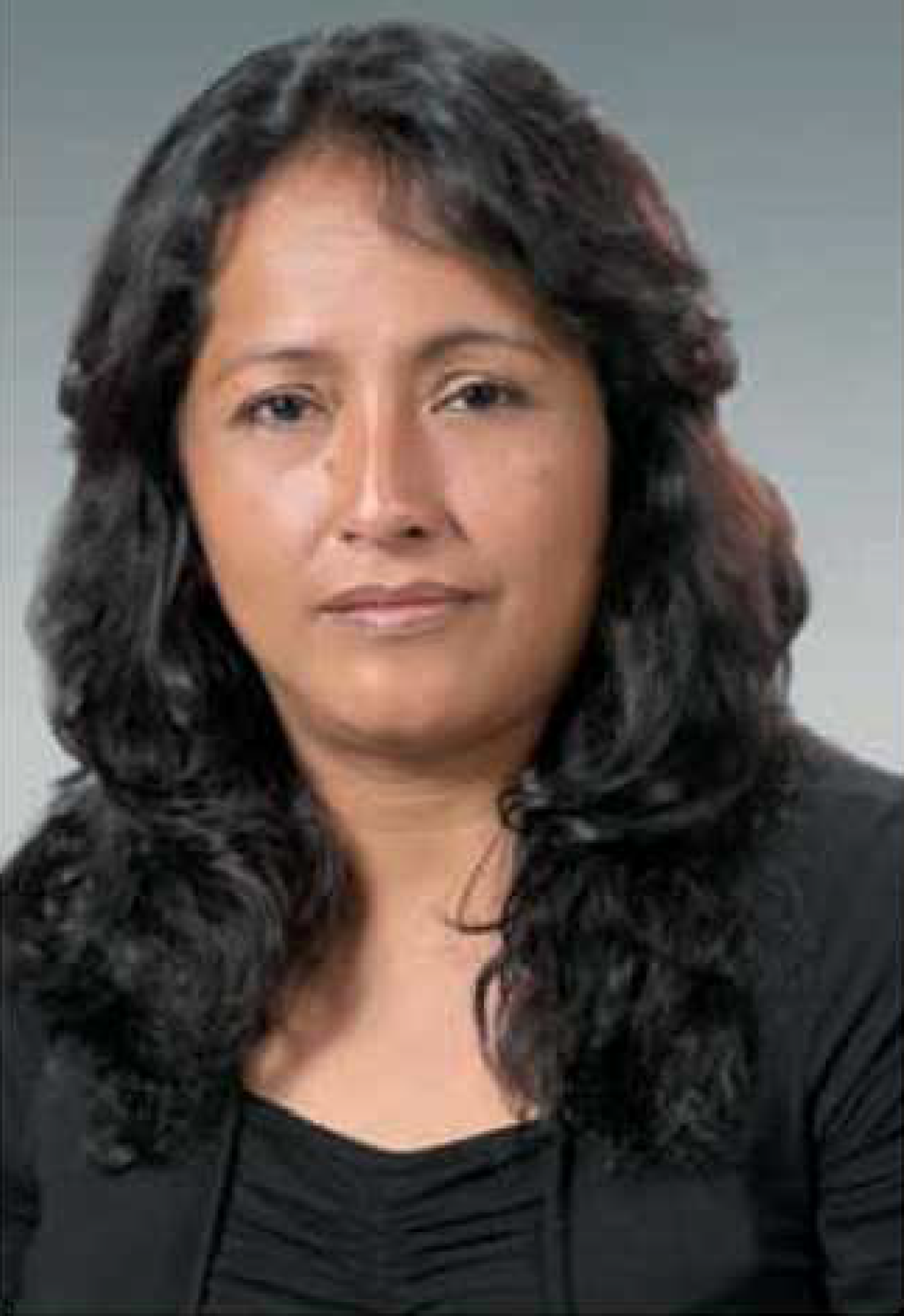
- Official portrait, 2014

Member of the Chamber of Deputies from Beni circumscription 63
- Substitute
- In office 25 January 2010 – 14 July 2014
- Deputy: Antonio Molina
- Preceded by: Elvio Gil
- Succeeded by: Circumscription abolished
- Constituency: Ballivián; Vaca Díez; Yacuma

Personal details
- Born: María Gardenia Arauz Menacho; 13 March 1972 (age 54) San Borja, Beni, Bolivia
- Party: Third System Movement (2020–2021)
- Other political affiliations: Movement for Socialism (until c. 2012); Freedom of Thought for Bolivia (2014–2015)
- Occupation: Politician; trade unionist

María Gardenia Arauz Menacho (born 13 March 1972) is a Bolivian politician and trade unionist who served as a substitute member of the Chamber of Deputies from Beni, representing circumscription 63 from 2010 to 2014.

Born in San Borja, Arauz played an active role in union organizing around the Ballivián Province, culminating in her election as head of the region's peasants' federation in 2008. The wide-ranging alliance between the Movement for Socialism and the country's social movement organizations soon led her to join the party, and in 2009, she was elected to the Chamber of Deputies in representation of it.

In the course of her tenure, Arauz grew disaffected by the stringent leadership structure of the ruling party. Together with other "freethinking" legislators, she formed her own front, Freedom of Though for Bolivia. As part of its alliance with the Fearless Movement, Arauz sought reelection in 2014 but failed to achieve it. A subsequent bid for deputy governor of the Ballivián Province in 2021 also did not pan out.

== Early life and career ==
Gardenia Arauz was born on 13 March 1972 in San Borja, Beni, to Aquiles Arauz Guzmán and Oralea Menacho Moreno. Arauz completed her primary and secondary schooling in her home city before traveling to La Paz to pursue higher education; she attended three years of dentistry studies but ultimately left university without completing a degree. On her return to San Borja, she set up shop as a hairdresser.

Arauz began taking part in local associative and union activities in the Ballivián Province around 2005; she held membership in the province's rice producers association and was elected to chair its peasants' federation in 2008.

== Chamber of Deputies ==
=== Election ===
Arauz's beginnings in union organizing coincided with the rise to government of the Movement for Socialism (MAS-IPSP) backed by trade syndicates and social movement organizations. The organic alliance between these organized groups and the party led many individuals to hold dual positions within both; Arauz, for example, chaired the MAS's Commission on Organizations.

In 2009, with the MAS, Arauz was nominated to contest a seat in the Chamber of Deputies, accompanying Antonio Molina as his substitute. The pair ran to represent circumscription 63 of Beni, a district encompassing large portions of the Arauz's native Ballivián Province, as well as sections of neighboring Vaca Díez and Yacuma. In a closely contested race, they narrowly won the election.

=== Tenure ===
Over the course of her term, the lack of individual autonomy given by the MAS to its parliamentarians to conduct legislative work led Arauz to grow critical of the party. In 2012, she denounced that, the previous year, the then-president of the lower chamber, Héctor Arce, had attempted to dissuade her from inspecting alleged tax evasion at the Manquiri Mining Company. In retaliation for her non-compliance, she was referred to the Ethics Commission, where a disciplinary process for "undue oversight" was opened against her. The incident culminated in Arauz's decision to quit the party.

In defecting, Arauz joined a sizable number of disaffected lawmakers that split from the ruling party throughout 2010–2015 legislative term—both in the Senate and Chamber of Deputies. Specifically, Arauz was among the faction of self-styled "freethinkers" that consolidated around the leadership of Rebeca Delgado. The group formalized its status in 2014 with the formation of a new party, Freedom of Though for Bolivia (LPB), which aligned itself with another ex-MAS ally, the Fearless Movement (MSM), for that year's general election. The pact garnered LPB's members select candidacies on the MSM's parliamentary lists; Arauz was given the top slot on its slate of Chamber of Deputies candidates in Beni, for which she resigned her seat as a substitute. In a highly polarized electoral climate, the MSM failed to find its footing among the electorate; Arauz's reelection bid fell through, accompanying a nationwide underperformance for the party, which culminated in its dissolution as a legally-recognized entity.

=== Commission assignments ===
- Territorial Organization of the State and Autonomies Commission (2014)
- Education and Health Commission
  - Health, Sports, and Recreation Committee (2010–2011)
- Human Rights Commission
  - Human Rights and Equal Opportunities Committee (2012–2013)
- Amazon Region, Land, Territory, Water, Natural Resources, and Environment Commission (2011–2012, 2013–2014)

== Later political career ==
Following her 2014 defeat, Arauz took a brief hiatus from politics, returning in 2021 to contest local office. She ran to serve as deputy governor of her home Ballivián Province, attaining the nomination of the Third System Movement (MTS) to do so. The party, born of a separate faction of MAS dissidents led by Félix Patzi, achieved important victories in the Amazonian departments of Beni and Pando by "loaning" its acronym to individually popular local candidates. Nevertheless, Arauz was not among those victors.^{[§]}

== Electoral history ==
Electoral history of Gardenia Arauz
Year	Office	Party	Alliance	Votes			Result	Ref.
Year	Office	Party	Alliance	Total	%	P.	Result	Ref.
2009	Substitute deputy	Movement for Socialism		9,980	46.87%	1st	Won	
2014	Deputy	Freedom of Thought	Fearless Movement	2,567	1.44%	4th	Lost	(Note: Presented on an electoral list. The data shown represents the share of the vote the entire party/alliance received in that constituency.)
2021	Deputy governor	Third System Movement		3,925	15.20%	3rd	Lost	
Source: Plurinational Electoral Organ | Electoral Atlas

Chamber of Deputies of Bolivia
Preceded by Elvio Gil	Substitute Member of the Chamber of Deputies from Beni circumscription 63; 2010–2014	Circumscription abolished
