= Romina Pérez =

Bolivian diplomat and politician (born 1958)

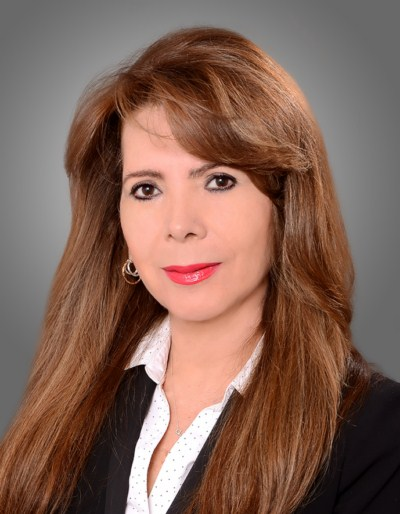

Ambassador of Bolivia to Iran
- Incumbent
- Assumed office 4 February 2021
- President: Luis Arce
- Preceded by: Position established
- In office 3 June 2019 – 15 November 2019
- President: Evo Morales
- Preceded by: Walter Yañez (Note: As chargé d'affaires.)
- Succeeded by: Position dissolved

Member of the Chamber of Deputies from Cochabamba
- In office 18 January 2015 – 3 June 2019
- Substitute: Ademar Valda
- Preceded by: Rebeca Delgado
- Succeeded by: Grover Cuevas
- Constituency: Party list

Personal details
- Born: Romina Guadalupe Pérez Ramos; 17 November 1958 (age 67) Cochabamba, Bolivia
- Party: Movement for Socialism
- Other political affiliations: Communist
- Education: Higher University of San Simón
- Occupation: Diplomat; politician; sociologist

Romina Guadalupe Pérez Ramos (born 17 November 1958) is a Bolivian academic, diplomat, politician, and sociologist who served as ambassador of Bolivia to Iran from 2019 to 2020 and since 2021. A member of the Movement for Socialism, she previously served as a party-list member of the Chamber of Deputies from Cochabamba from 2015 to 2019. Pérez graduated as a sociologist from the Higher University of San Simón before completing postgraduate studies in the European Union. She comes from a generation of leftist academics who entered political activity as activists against the military dictatorships of the 1970s and 80s, as well as the neoliberal democratic governments that succeeded them. Her work in the field of women's and ethnic rights led her to join multiple NGOs, including the Center for Legal Studies and Social Research, through which many academics and intellectuals became politically linked with the Movement for Socialism. In 2014, she won a seat in the Chamber of Deputies on the party's electoral list but did not complete her term, being appointed ambassador to Iran in mid-2019.

== Early life and career ==
Romina Pérez was born on 17 November 1958 in Cochabamba. She studied at the Higher University of San Simón, graduating with a bachelor's in sociology and a master's in planning, elaboration, and evaluation of sustainable development projects, in addition to a diploma in political science from San Simón's Center for Higher University Studies. From 2009 to 2011, she undertook postgraduate studies abroad, receiving an Erasmus Mundus scholarship to attend the universities of Copenhagen, Granada, and Rennes, where she completed a double master's in public health. Through a separate scholarship, Pérez also attended the University of Bologna, completing courses in health administration and social work management.

Pérez comes from a generation of intellectuals and researchers mainly educated in social and human sciences whose political trajectories were defined by their left-wing sympathies. She entered political activity as an activist against the ultra-conservative military dictatorships of the 1970s and 80s and, from 1982, in opposition to the neoliberal democratic governments that succeeded them. In her adolescence, Pérez joined the communist youth, which later resulted in her exile to the Soviet Union for some time. Returning to Bolivia, she worked alongside the country's mineworkers—one of the Communist Party's primary sectoral bases of support—compiling their history, political agitations, and class struggles. The finished audio literary works were donated to the archives of the Syndical Federation of Bolivian Mineworkers.

== Political career ==
From 1985 to 1988, Pérez served as vice president of the Bolivian University Confederation and represented Bolivia at the International Union of Students. Throughout the 1990s, she worked as a university professor at various public and private institutions. As with numerous prominent leftist academics around this time, Pérez's career at the turn of the twentieth century shifted its emphasis away from class struggle and toward the full realization of women's and ethnic rights. From 1996 to 1998, she served as director of gender in the municipal governments of Cochabamba and Santa Cruz de la Sierra, was a consultant for various indigenous organizations, and held positions at multiple NGOs, including the Permanent Assembly of Human Rights and the Center for Legal Studies and Social Research. The latter, a left-wing institution aligned with the indigenous movement, "became a 'nursery' for intellectual and political cadres of the Movement for Socialism (MAS-IPSP)", many of whom got their start in the 2006–2007 Constituent Assembly. Such was the case with Pérez, who was appointed as a delegate to the Constituent Assembly on behalf of the Cochabamba prefecture. Upon the assembly's closure, she continued to serve in the prefecture as its director of gender until 2008.

Pérez's association with the MAS solidified in 2014 when the party nominated her as a candidate for a seat in the Chamber of Deputies. She topped the party's electoral list in the Cochabamba Department, providing for an easy entry into the chamber. In addition to ordinary parliamentary work, Pérez spent much of her tenure serving as a member of the mixed special commission that investigated the privatization and capitalization process that occurred between 1990 and 2001, a post in line with her opposition to the neoliberal economic practices of the day. The commission ultimately determined that the sale of State-owned enterprises in that period cost the country US$21 billion in economic damages. In the international sphere, she served as a member of the Parliamentary Confederation of the Americas and was vice president and, from 2018, president of the body's Women Parliamentarians Network.

== Diplomatic career ==
Nearing the conclusion of her term in 2019, Pérez was designated to serve as ambassador to Iran, a country with which Bolivia under Evo Morales strengthened bilateral relations due to shared political positions, especially regarding the United States's "meddling" in international affairs. However, her brief tenure in Tehran was cut short not long thereafter due to the political crisis her home country suffered in November, an event Pérez denounced as a coup d'état. Within days of its assumption, the conservative transitional government that succeeded Morales terminated eighty percent of his administration's ambassadorial staff, and in mid-2020, it closed the country's embassy in Iran, ostensibly as a cost-saving measure. When Bolivia reinitiated relations with Iran following the MAS's return to power, Pérez was ratified as the country's ambassador.

Pérez's second term as head of the Bolivian legation in Tehran coincided with a series of women's rights demonstrations that wracked the West Asian country following the violent death of Mahsa Amini in late 2022. Referring to the unrest, Iran's state news agency reported that Pérez, on behalf of the Bolivian government, had condemned the protests, stating that the "riots" had been "perpetrated by British and American Zionists". The ambassador's polemic statements caused controversy back home, with opposition politicians and feminist organizations demanding her removal from office. In response, the Bolivian Foreign Ministry quickly recalled Pérez to La Paz to "receive a report and evaluate the circumstances" of her statements. For her part, Pérez denied ever making such declarations, assuring that her words had been "distorted", for which she demanded that Iranian media outlets rectify the discrepancy. Days later, the Islamic Republic News Agency issued a clarification, stating that it had made an "inaccurate interpretation of the ambassador's words".

== Electoral history ==
Electoral history of Romina Pérez
Year	Office	Party	Votes			Result	Ref.
Year	Office	Party	Total	%	P.	Result	Ref.
2014	Deputy	Movement for Socialism	637,125	66.67%	1st	Won	(Note: Presented on an electoral list. The data shown represents the share of the vote the entire party/alliance received in that constituency.)
Source: Plurinational Electoral Organ | Electoral Atlas

Chamber of Deputies of Bolivia
Preceded by Rebeca Delgado	Member of the Chamber of Deputies from Cochabamba; 2015–2019	Succeeded by Grover Cuevas
Preceded by Víctor Borda	First Vice President of the Chamber of Deputies; 2017–2018	Succeeded by Lino Cárdenas
Diplomatic posts
Preceded by Walter Yañez as chargé d'affaires	Ambassador of Bolivia to Iran; 2019	Position dissolved
Position established	Ambassador of Bolivia to Iran; 2021–present	Incumbent
