= Gisela López =

Bolivian Minister of Communication (2017–2019)

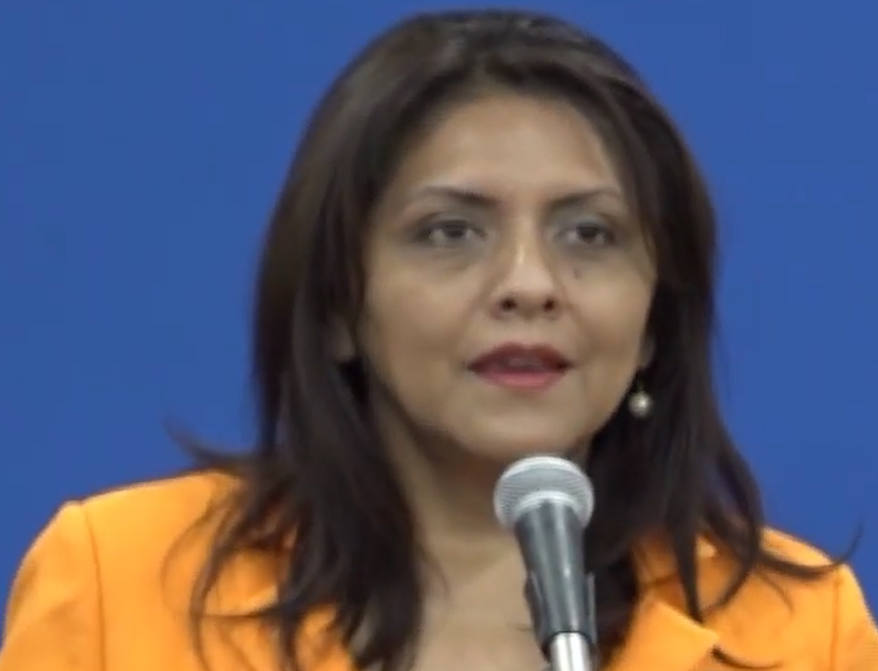

Minister of Communication
- In office 23 January 2017 – 23 January 2019
- President: Evo Morales
- Preceded by: Marianela Paco
- Succeeded by: Manuel Canelas

Vice Minister of Municipal and Departmental Autonomies
- In office 18 June 2013 – 2 February 2015
- President: Evo Morales
- Preceded by: Gregorio Aro
- Succeeded by: Emilio Rodas

Personal details
- Born: Gisela Karina López Rivas; 1968 (age 57–58) Santa Cruz de la Sierra, Bolivia
- Party: Movement for Socialism
- Education: Evangelical Bolivian University
- Occupation: Journalist; politician

Gisela Karina López Rivas (born 1968) is a Bolivian journalist and politician who served as minister of communication from 2017 to 2019. A member of the Movement for Socialism, she previously served as vice minister of municipal and departmental autonomies from 2013 to 2015.

== Biography ==
Gisela López was born in Santa Cruz de la Sierra in 1968. She began her education in 1974, completing a baccalaureate in her hometown in 1985. In 1986, she entered the Evangelical Bolivian University to study social communication, graduating as a journalist in 1991.

Over ten years, López dedicated herself to print media. In 2004, she received the National Journalism Award for her report Etnias en extinción. The Evangelical Bolivian University also presented her with a career recognition award in 2017.

López ventured into television and radio, carrying out critical and investigative journalism.

== Vice Minister of Autonomy (2013–2015) ==
On 18 June 2013, the Minister of Autonomy, Claudia Peña Claros, named Gisela López as her vice minister. López held the position until 2 February 2015, when she was replaced by Emilio Rodas.

== Minister of Communications of Bolivia (2017–2019) ==
On 23 January 2017, President Evo Morales appointed López Minister of Communications, replacing Marianela Paco.

She remained in charge of the ministry for two years, until she was succeeded as minister by Manuel Canelas on 23 January 2019.

Political offices
Preceded by Gregorio Aro	Vice Minister of Municipal and Departmental Autonomies; 2013–2015	Succeeded by Emilio Rodas
Preceded by Marianela Paco	Minister of Communication; 2017–2019	Succeeded by Manuel Canelas
