= Betty Tejada =

President of the Bolivian Chamber of Deputies (2013–2014)

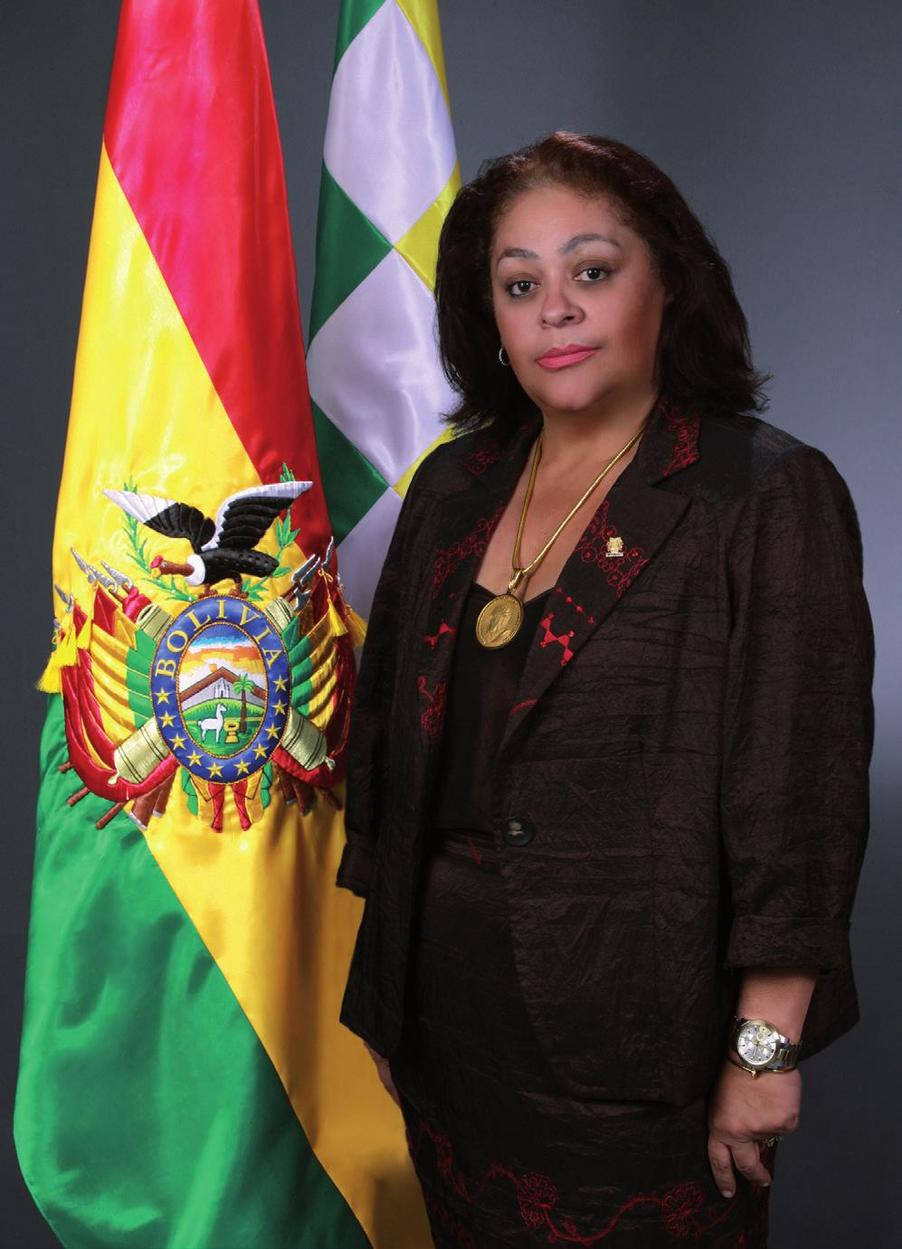
- Official portrait, 2013

President of the Chamber of Deputies
- In office 18 January 2013 – 21 January 2014
- Preceded by: Rebeca Delgado
- Succeeded by: Marcelo Elío

Member of the Chamber of Deputies from Santa Cruz
- In office 22 January 2010 – 2 January 2015
- Substitute: Mauro Peña
- Preceded by: Alejandro Colanzi
- Succeeded by: Eliane Capobianco
- Constituency: Party list
- In office 2 August 2002 – 22 January 2006
- Substitute: Eduardo Prudencio
- Preceded by: Helen Hayes
- Succeeded by: Arminda Méndez
- Constituency: Party list

Substitute Member of the Chamber of Deputies from Santa Cruz
- In office 6 August 1997 – 2 August 2002
- Deputy: Roberto Landívar
- Preceded by: Neptaly Mendoza
- Succeeded by: Mary Rocabado
- Constituency: Party list

Personal details
- Born: Betty Asunta Tejada Soruco; 5 June 1959 (age 67) Santa Cruz de la Sierra, Bolivia
- Party: Movement for Socialism (after 2005)
- Other political affiliations: New Republican Force (before 2004)
- Spouse: Ramón Prada
- Children: María Nela; María Cecilia; María Laura
- Education: Higher University of San Andrés
- Occupation: Ecologist; lawyer; politician

Betty Asunta Tejada Soruco (born 5 June 1959) is a Bolivian ecologist, lawyer, and politician who served as president of the Chamber of Deputies from 2013 to 2014. A member of the Movement for Socialism, she served as party-list member of the Chamber of Deputies from Santa Cruz from 2010 to 2015. Prior to that, she served in the same position from 2002 to 2006 and as a substitute party-list member of the Chamber of Deputies from Santa Cruz under Roberto Landívar from 1997 to 2002, on behalf of New Republican Force.

== Early life and career ==
Betty Tejada was born on 5 June 1959 to a middle-class family in Santa Cruz de la Sierra. While her mother was a housewife, her father was one of the first electrical engineers in the city and a founding member of the Rural Electrification Cooperative, Santa Cruz's first electric association. Upon completing primary studies in that city, Tejada moved to La Paz, where she graduated high school before attending the Higher University of San Andrés to study law. Her education was briefly suspended by the 1980 coup d'état of Luis García Meza, during which time many documents were burned, causing her to lose a year of studies. Upon the university's reopening, Tejada returned to classes, graduating with a diploma in ecological economics.

After that, Tejada returned to Santa Cruz, where she devoted her career to social services and environmental activities. During this time, Tejada worked to channel funds for the Modelo daycare center in the La Ramada barrio and founded the Santa Cruz Somos Todos urban movement. Additionally, she is the founder of multiple environmental groups, including the Salpi Collective, dedicated to conserving the Piray River. Together with other women's rights activists, she co-founded the Santa Cruz Women's Christian Association and founded the Nuevo Poder feminist group.

At age 19, Tejada married Ramón Prada, who served as prefect of the Santa Cruz Department during the administration of Hugo Banzer. Together they had three children: María Cecilia, María Laura, and María Nela. The latter is the incumbent minister of the presidency, serving in the administration of Luis Arce since 2020.

== Chamber of Deputies ==
=== Substitute deputy (1997–2002) ===
Tejada became active in politics through her membership in Nuevo Poder. For the 1997 general elections, the group formed a series of alliances with the country's major parties in a bid to facilitate greater women's representation in Congress. Tejada joined the New Republican Force (NFR) and was elected as a substitute deputy from Santa Cruz under Roberto Landívar on the party's electoral list. In early 2000, during the NFR's internal democratization process, the party appointed Tejada as its temporary departmental chief in Santa Cruz. Once proper internal elections were held the following year, she was voted into a full term in that position.

=== First term (2002–2006) ===
In the 2002 general elections, Tejada was elected as a titular member of the Chamber of Deputies from Santa Cruz. However, she questioned the decision of the NFR's leader, Manfred Reyes Villa, to ally the party with the abortive government of Gonzalo Sánchez de Lozada. Her presence as one of multiple openly critical voices against party leadership led the NFR to support her ouster as departmental head through the election of Jaime Rivero in 2004. Tejada refused to recognize Rivero's "illegal election", claiming that her functions were not set to expire for another two years. Tejada's public disagreements with Reyes Villa resulted in a permanent rupture between herself and the NFR when the party expelled her from its ranks. For the duration of her term, she supported the administration of Sánchez de Lozada's successor, Carlos Mesa, who attempted to govern without partisan support, instead seeking to attract individual legislators to form a parliamentary majority, though he was ultimately unsuccessful.

=== Second term (2010–2015) ===
In 2005, Tejada became one of several former rightists who joined the ranks of the emergent Movement for Socialism (MAS-IPSP). Though she was absent from the 2005 elections, Tejada was convinced by former ombudsman Ana María Romero to run as a candidate for the MAS in the 2009 elections. After being elected, Tejada served three consecutive terms on the Commission for Autonomies and Decentralization between 2010 and 2012. During this time, Tejada also continued her environmental advocacy, drafting at least five laws relating to the environment throughout her term.

In January 2013, the MAS caucus chose not to ratify Rebeca Delgado as president of the Chamber of Deputies due to disagreements over an asset forfeiture bill. After four hours of extensive debate, the party elected Tejada to succeed Delgado on 17 January. She was sworn in the following day. Tejada's management lasted just over a year, and she was succeeded by Marcelo Elío on 21 January 2014. Nearing the end of her term, she sought to run as a MAS candidate for Santa Cruz city councillor. However, the Supreme Electoral Tribunal (TSE) ruled that all potential candidates must have lived in the districts in which they were running for at least two years, a fact that disqualified most incumbent deputies and senators from running in the 2015 regional elections. Her disapproval of the TSE's decision led Tejada to resign her seat on 2 January 2015, a few weeks before the new Legislative Assembly was sworn in.

== Santa Cruz Municipal Council ==
Despite not being allowed to stand as a candidate, Tejada nonetheless had the opportunity to join the Santa Cruz Municipal Council. At the recommendation of Mayor Percy Fernández, Angélica Sosa, president of the municipal council, appointed Tejada as her personal advisor. The decision was somewhat surprising as Tejada's party, the MAS, was the minority opposition bloc in the municipal council. Though Tejada ruled out joining the ranks of Fernández and Sosa's Santa Cruz Para Todos party, the MAS nonetheless affirmed that she no longer had "[any] connection with the organic structure of the party".

== Electoral history ==
Electoral history of Betty Tejada
| Year | Office | Party | Alliance | Votes | | | Result | Ref. |
| Year | Office | Party | Alliance | Total | % | P. | Result | Ref. |
|---|---|---|---|---|---|---|---|---|
| 1997 | Sub. Deputy | New Republican Force | ADN-NFR-PDC | 126,863 | 24.04% | 3rd (Note: Presented on an electoral list. The data shown represents the share of the vote the entire party/alliance received in that constituency.) | Won | |
| 2002 | Deputy | New Republican Force | None | 147,054 | 22.40% | 3rd | Won | |
| 2009 | Deputy | Movement for Socialism | None | 441,705 | 40.91% | 2nd | Won | |
Source: Plurinational Electoral Organ | Electoral Atlas

Chamber of Deputies of Bolivia
| Preceded by Neptaly Mendoza | Substitute Member of the Chamber of Deputies from Santa Cruz; 1997–2002 | Succeeded by Mary Rocabado |
| Preceded by Helen Hayes | Member of the Chamber of Deputies from Santa Cruz; 2002–2005 | Succeeded by Arminda Méndez |
| Preceded by Alejandro Colanzi | Member of the Chamber of Deputies from Santa Cruz; 2010–2015 | Succeeded by Eliane Capobianco |
| Preceded by Rebeca Delgado | President of the Chamber of Deputies; 2013–2014 | Succeeded by Marcelo Elío |
