= Yesenia Yarhui =

Bolivian politician (born 1995)

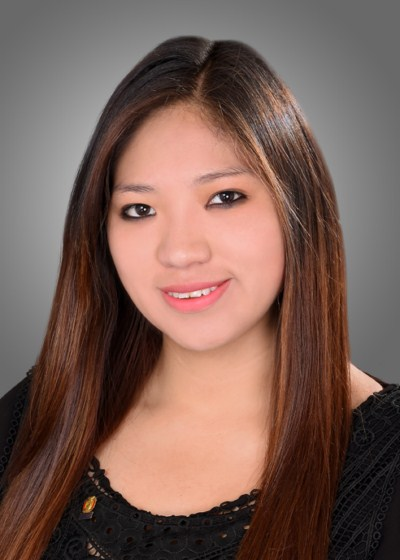
- Official portrait, 2017

Member of the Chamber of Deputies from Chuquisaca
- In office 18 January 2015 – 3 November 2020
- Substitute: Luis Fernando Paz; Willams Vilar
- Preceded by: Virginia Ramírez
- Succeeded by: Marcelo Pedrazas
- Constituency: Party list

Personal details
- Born: Yesenia Yarhui Albino; 16 August 1995 (age 31) Sucre, Bolivia
- Party: Christian Democratic (2014–2020)
- Relatives: Tomasa Yarhui (aunt)
- Education: University of San Francisco Xavier (LL.B.)
- Occupation: Lawyer; politician

Yesenia Yarhui Albino (born 16 August 1995) is a Bolivian lawyer, politician, and former student leader who served as a party-list member of the Chamber of Deputies from Chuquisaca from 2015 to 2020. An activist forged in the student movement, Yarhui entered politics in 2014 as a candidate on the Christian Democratic Party ballot. Elected in that year's general elections, Yarhui was just 19 years old upon her entry into the Chamber of Deputies, making her the youngest parliamentarian in Bolivian history.

== Early life ==
Yesenia Yarhui was born on 16 August 1995 in Sucre. Yarhui's political trajectory began as a member of Chuquisaca's student movement; she served as secretary of conflicts in the Chuquisaca Students' Federation and was a youth representative before the Unified Syndical Confederation of Rural Workers of Bolivia. Yarhui attended the University of San Francisco Xavier, during which time she served as a member of its Faculty of Law's Scientific and Research Society, later graduating with a Bachelor of Laws and political and social sciences.

== Chamber of Deputies ==
=== Election ===
In 2014, Yarhui was invited by the Christian Democratic Party (PDC) to be a candidate for a seat in the Chamber of Deputies in that year's general elections. Yarhui's accession to the party's electoral list had been suggested by her aunt, Tomasa Yarhui, a Quechua peasant leader running as the PDC's vice-presidential candidate. Though the family connection was questioned by critics, Tomasa Yarhui assured that Yesenia's selection was an opportunity for young leaders to participate in politics.

=== Tenure ===
Elected at the tail end of 2014, Yarhui assumed office on 18 January 2015. Aged 19 years, 5 months, and 2 days old at the time of her assumption, Yarhui became the youngest parliamentarian in Bolivian history, as well as the youngest legislator in Latin America. Her ability to assume the position was made possible by the passage of the 2009 Constitution, which reduced age requirements to hold office in the Legislative Assembly. Yarhui's status as the country's youngest legislator was a central pillar of her tenure in the Chamber of Deputies, one she used to promote the participation of youth and women in politics. In an interview with the nonprofit Women's Coordination Committee, Yarhui outlined the need to do away with the "cultural stigmatization of being young and female" so as to ensure that those groups "can be taken into account as true protagonists in decision-making". Regarding her experience as a legislator, Yarhui recalled facing mistrust from her colleagues, including from within her own caucus, for "supposedly not having the capacity [to legislate]". However, she assured that that difficulty lessened with time, and in 2019, she even attained significant support from some of her colleagues to contest the leadership of the PDC caucus, nearly winning the election.

==== Commission assignments ====
- Planning, Economic Policy, and Finance Commission
  - Mining and Metallurgy Committee (2015–2018)
- Planning, Economic Policy, and Finance Commission
  - Budget, Tax Policy, and Comptroller's Office Committee (2018–2019)
- Plural Justice, Prosecutor's Office, and Legal Defense of the State Commission
  - Ordinary Jurisdiction and Magistracy Council Committee (2019–2020)

== Later political career ==
Nearing the end of her service in the Chamber of Deputies, Yarhui expressed an interest in continuing her burgeoning career in politics. Just over a year after leaving office, Yarhui was sworn into the second cabinet of Damián Condori, the governor of Chuquisaca. She was appointed to serve as departmental secretary of culture, tourism, productive development, and employment, a broad-ranging position brought about by the merger of the Secretariat of Productive Development with the Directorate of Culture as a measure of economic austerity. She held the post for just one year before being replaced during Condori's annual cabinet reshuffle. She was reassigned as director of the cabinet.

== Electoral history ==
Electoral history of Yesenia Yarhui
| Year | Office | Party | Votes | | | Result | Ref. |
| Year | Office | Party | Total | % | P. | Result | Ref. |
|---|---|---|---|---|---|---|---|
| 2014 | Deputy | Christian Democratic | 44,671 | 17.08% | 2nd (Note: Presented on an electoral list. The data shown represents the share of the vote the entire party/alliance received in that constituency.) | Won | |
Source: Plurinational Electoral Organ | Electoral Atlas

Chamber of Deputies of Bolivia
| Preceded by Virginia Ramírez | Member of the Chamber of Deputies from Chuquisaca; 2015–2020 | Succeeded by Marcelo Pedrazas |
Political offices
| Preceded by Juan Caba as Director of Culture and Tourism | Secretary of Culture, Tourism, Productive Development, and Employment of Chuquisaca; 2022–2023 | Succeeded by Félix Almendras |
| Preceded by Lidia Galeán as Secretary of Productive Development | Secretary of Culture, Tourism, Productive Development, and Employment of Chuquisaca; 2022–2023 | Succeeded by Félix Almendras |
