= Manuel Canelas =

Bolivian politician (born 1981)

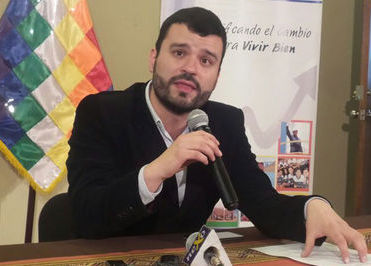

Minister of Communication
- In office 23 January 2019 – 10 November 2019
- President: Evo Morales
- Preceded by: Gísela López
- Succeeded by: Roxana Lizárraga

Deputy Minister for Planning and Coordination
- In office 1 February 2018 – 23 January 2019
- President: Evo Morales

Personal details
- Born: José Manuel Canelas Jaime; 21 October 1981 (age 44) Caracas, Venezuela
- Party: Movement for Socialism
- Education: Complutense University of Madrid
- Occupation: Politician; political scientist

José Manuel Canelas Jaime (born 21 October 1981) is a Bolivian politician and political scientist. He served as Minister of Communication in Bolivia from 23 January 2019 to 10 November 2019, during the third term of president Evo Morales Alma. He also held the position of Deputy Minister for Planning and Coordination in Bolivia from 1 February 2018 to 23 January 2019.

== Biography ==
Canelas was born in Caracas on 21 October 1981, after his father Víctor Hugo Canelas was exiled for political activities during the dictatorship of Luis García Meza, and grew up in La Paz. In 1984, his family returned to Bolivia, where his sister was born. He underwent education in La Paz, and subsequently moved to Spain to pursue his university studies.

Canelas comes from a family with ties to the journalism industry. His uncle Jorge Canelas was the founder of the newspapers La Razón, La Prensa and Pulso, and the family has ownership of multiple media outlets.

He studied political science at the Complutense University of Madrid (UCM) before obtaining a master's degree in governing and public administration at the Instituto Universitario Ortega-Marañón of UCM.

From 2009 to 2012, Canelas worked on multiple research projects in Spain, such as "Indigenous influence on state transformation: interculturalism and ethno-development in the constitutional processes of Ecuador and Bolivia" of the Carolina Foundation, and "The World Social Forum: actors, discourses and strategies".

He returned to Bolivia in May 2012 with the intent of hosting a talk show. From 2013 to 2014, he assumed the position of presidential representative for the 2025 agenda, and within the same year acted as a consultant to the vice presidency of the Plurinational State of Bolivia. He started the television program "Esta Casa no es Hotel" on the network ATB.

=== Political activities ===
Canelas entered politics in 2014 as a MAS candidate for a single-member constituency seat in Constituency 3 of the department of La Paz. He came out as a homosexual during the election campaign.

In 2015, Canelas served on the Joint Constitutional Committee of the Plurinational Legislative Assembly, which drafted the constitutional amendment to allow President Evo Morales to stand for re-election; this amendment was ultimately rejected in a referendum.

He was elected to parliament and, in 2017, chaired the committee that investigated the Panama Papers; its final report stated that, in addition to the 360 companies registered in Bolivia, 198 individuals were investigated, leading to 76 cases being opened.

In 2018, he was appointed Deputy Minister for Planning and Coordination. On 23 January 2019, he took over as Minister of Communication, succeeding Gisela López.
