= Marianela Paco =

Bolivian Minister of Communication (2015–2017)

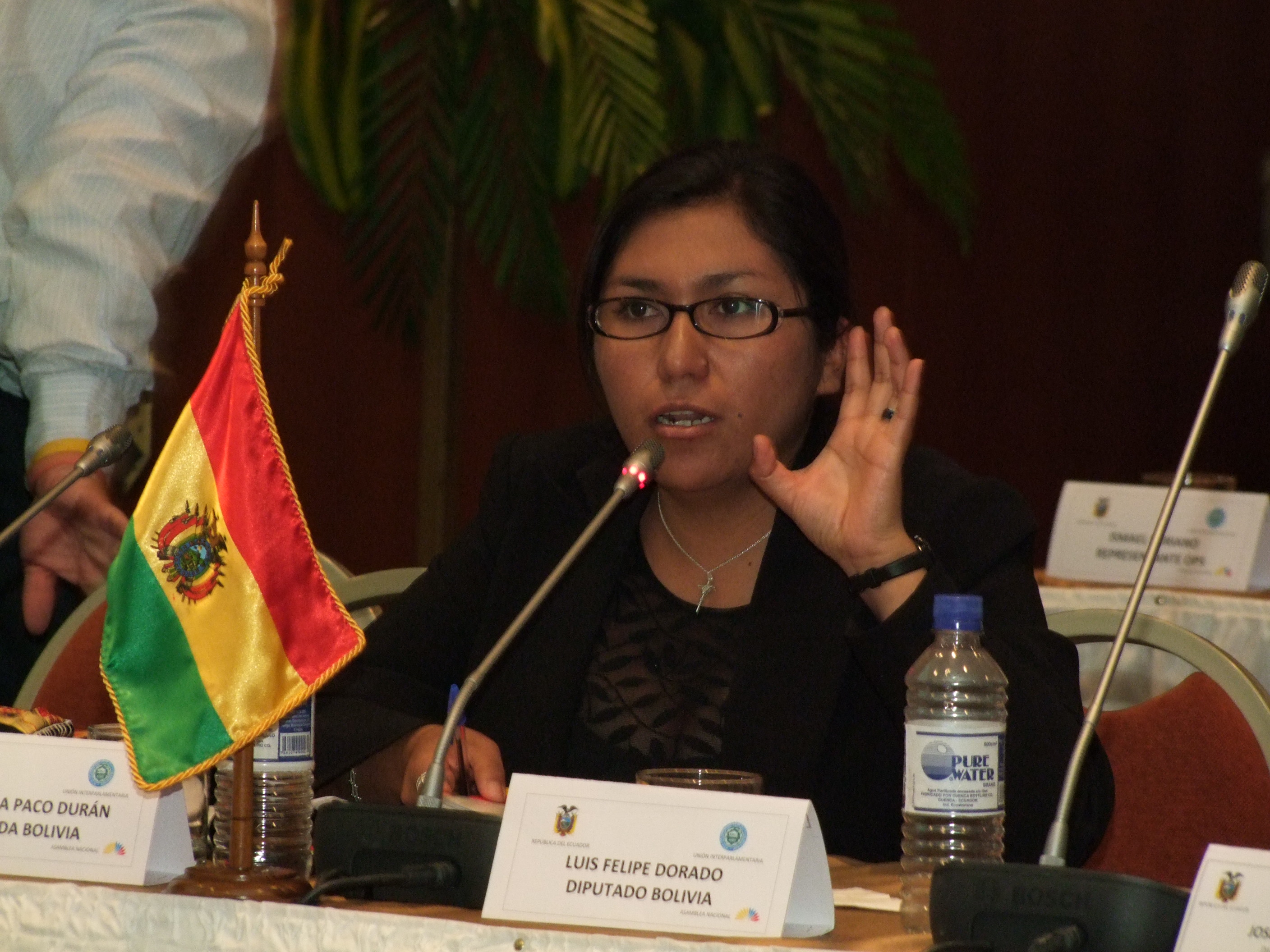

Minister of Communication
- In office 23 January 2015 – 23 January 2017
- President: Evo Morales
- Preceded by: Amanda Dávila
- Succeeded by: Gísela López

Member of the Chamber of Deputies from Chuquisaca
- In office 19 January 2010 – 18 January 2015
- Alternate: Juan Carlos Apaza
- Constituency: Plurinominal

Personal details
- Born: Marianela Paco Durán; 28 November 1976 (age 49) Tupiza, Bolivia
- Party: Movement for Socialism
- Education: University of Saint Francis Xavier
- Occupation: Journalist; lawyer; politician

Marianela Paco Durán (born 28 November 1976) is a Bolivian journalist, lawyer, and politician who served as minister of communication from 2015 to 2017. A member of the Movement for Socialism, she previously served as a plurinominal member of the Chamber of Deputies from Chuquisaca from 2010 to 2015.

== Biography ==
Marianela Paco was born in the town of Tupiza on 28 November 1976. She is the daughter of two teachers – from Cotagaita and Betanzos – and the oldest of five siblings.

For professional reasons, her parents moved the family to Potosí, where they remained until she was five years old, when they moved again, this time to the municipality of Quivincha. She took intermediate and baccalaureate studies in Betanzos. In Sucre, she earned licentiates in social communication and in law, political, and social sciences at the University of Saint Francis Xavier.

From 2000 to 2004 she worked at the Youth Social Ministry, and from 2005 to 2009 she was a social communicator and journalist on Aclo Foundation Radio, part of the Radio Erbol Network, notably as a news announcer in Quechua.

On 23 May 2008, she reported having been the victim of attacks by groups of agitators close to former Chuquisaca governor Savina Cuéllar and the so-called Inter-institutional Committee, who mobilized in Sucre to confront the campesinos who arrived from the countryside to meet President Evo Morales. Paco claimed that they doused her with alcohol and threatened to set her on fire.

They said to us: "Go back to your pigs, to the countryside and your cows." We must never let them humiliate us like that again.

== Political career ==
In 2009, Paco was elected to the Chamber of Deputies, representing Chuquisaca Department for the MAS. There she assumed the presidency of Chuquisaca's parliamentary brigade, and became the president of the Chamber's Human Rights Commission. Her work in the Assembly focused on the defense of human rights and women's rights. She was one of the authors of the new Family Code and Family Process. She was an editor, designer, and one of the main promoters of the Law Against Racism, whose debate began in 2010. She also championed the Comprehensive Law Against Human Trafficking, the Law Against Harassment and Political Violence Against Women, and the Comprehensive Law Against Violence Against Women.

In 2015, she was appointed Minister of Communications in the government of Evo Morales.

During her tenure, she positioned herself in favor of community radio and free software as instruments of technological decolonization. She initiated review and debate on the use of social networks to ensure respect for the dignity of people and reduce the vulnerability of children and adolescents.

In October 2016, Paco was hospitalized several times for health reasons. She was diagnosed with microangiopathy. On 29 December 2016, she announced that she would not resign despite her illness. On 23 January 2017, Gísela López replaced her as Minister of Communications.

== Controversies ==
Marianela Paco usually wears a sombrero in her public appearances. This has generated criticism on social networks, which she ascribes to racist reactions. In interviews, she has explained that she has worn it since 2011 in tribute to the campesinos who were blocked from entering the plaza of Sucre in May 2008 due to their condition and attire. She also sees it as a symbol of cultural identity and political commitment. In response to the online attacks, she filed a lawsuit against 20 politicians, holding them responsible for spreading racism.

Political offices
| Preceded by Amanda Dávila | Minister of Communication; 2015–2017 | Succeeded by Gísela López |
