= Rodolfo Illanes =

Bolivian politician

Deputy Minister of Internal Affairs of Bolivia
- In office 14 March 2016 – 25 August 2016
- President: Evo Morales
- Preceded by: Marcelo Elío Chávez
- Succeeded by: Pedro Julio Villa

Personal details
- Born: 18 August 1958 La Paz, Bolivia
- Died: 25 August 2016 (aged 58)
- Cause of death: Lynching
- Party: Movement for Socialism
- Occupation: Lawyer

Rodolfo J. Illanes Alvarado (18 August 1958 – 25 August 2016) was a Bolivian lawyer and politician who served as Deputy Minister of Internal Affairs from 14 March 2016 to 25 August 2016, during the third cabinet of President Evo Morales.

== Biography ==
Rodolfo Illanes was born in the city of La Paz in 1958. He was a lawyer at the Higher University of San Andrés (UMSA). He had also had a specialty in Criminal Sciences, from the University of Costa Rica.

He was an adviser to President Evo Morales in his first term. In the Ministry of Labour he held the position of Superintendent of Civil Service and then Deputy Minister of Work, Employment, and Social Security.

On 14 March 2016, he assumed the position of Deputy Minister of Internal Affairs, replacing Marcelo Elío Chávez.

== Kidnapping and death ==
On 25 August 2016, Illanes was kidnapped along with his assistant while heading to Panduro to speak to anti-government protesters and then was later killed by the striking miners who abducted him. His murder shocked the South American country. Defence Minister Reymi Ferreira broke down on television as he described how Illanes, appointed to his post in March, had apparently been "beaten and tortured to death".

Government minister Carlos Romero called it a "cowardly and brutal killing" and asked the miners to immediately hand over the body.
