= María Nela Prada =

Bolivian politician (born 1981)

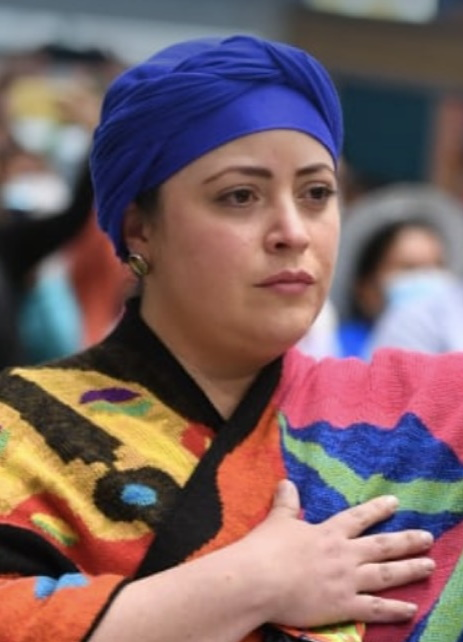
- Prada at her swearing in, 9 November 2020

Minister of the Presidency
- In office 9 November 2020 – 9 November 2025
- President: Luis Arce
- Preceded by: Yerko Núñez
- Succeeded by: José Luis Lupo

Head of the Rape and Femicide Case Review Commission
- In office 4 February 2022 – 9 November 2025
- President: Luis Arce
- Preceded by: Commission established

Personal details
- Born: María Nela Prada Tejada; 24 January 1981 (age 45) Santa Cruz de la Sierra, Bolivia
- Party: Movement for Socialism (2005–present)
- Parent(s): Ramón Prada; Betty Tejada

María Nela Prada Tejada (born 24 January 1981) is a Bolivian diplomat and politician who served as the minister of the presidency from 2020 to 2025 under president Luis Arce. A member of the Movement for Socialism, she served as Arce's chief of staff under during his tenure as minister of economy from 2006 to 2017 and in 2019.

== Biography ==
María Nela Prada was born on 24 January 1981 in Santa Cruz de la Sierra to Ramón Prada and Betty Tejada. Her father served as prefect of Santa Cruz from 1999 to 2001, appointed by President Hugo Banzer. Prada's mother, Betty Tejada, served as president of the Chamber of Deputies from 2013 to 2014. Due to familial links, the family was historically related to Banzer's right-wing Nationalist Democratic Action party —Ramón was the nephew of Banzer's wife, Yolanda Prada. However, by 2005, Prada and her mother had aligned themselves with the Movement for Socialism (MAS-IPSP) —which came to power the following year— as a result of the social movements spearheaded by the MAS at the time. Prada recalls that, though she and her father "did not share the same political path […] he taught me to respect those differences".

Prada graduated from university with a degree in international relations and went on to receive a master's degree in State planning and economics. Additionally, she is fluent in three languages. Prada's economics experience led her to accompany Luis Arce as his chief of staff during his decade-long tenure as minister of economy in the government of Evo Morales. Additionally, in 2011, she served as director of the Bolivian Port Services Administration (ASPB).

== Minister of the Presidency ==
Upon becoming president, Arce appointed Prada as his minister of the presidency on 9 November 2020. She is the first woman to have held the position. After being sworn in, Prada delivered a speech on behalf of the new ministerial cabinet, in which she advocated for reconciliation and stated that "differences must be accepted" between supporters and opponents of Arce's government. In 2022, she was designated as the head of the Rape and Femicide Case Review Commission, formed by the president to investigate cases of corruption by judges in favor of convicts charged with femicide or rape.

Political offices
Preceded by Yerko Núñez	Minister of the Presidency; 2020–2025	Succeeded by José Luis Lupo
Commission established	Head of the Rape and Femicide; Case Review Commission; 2022–2025	
