= Héctor Arce =

Bolivian politician

Héctor Enrique Arce
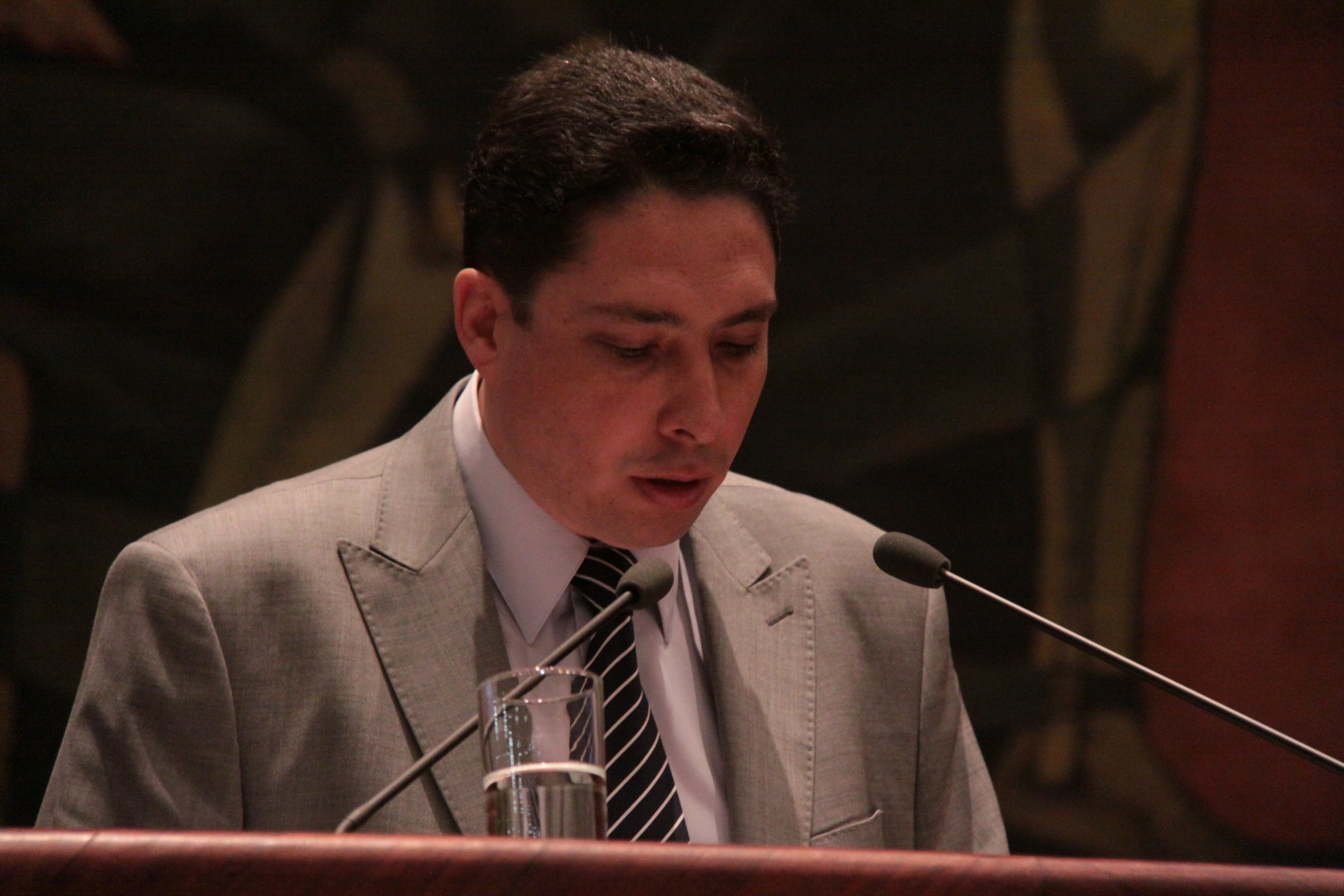

Minister of Justice and Institutional Transparency
- In office 23 January 2017 – 10 November 2019
- President: Evo Morales
- Preceded by: Virginia Velasco
- Succeeded by: Álvaro Coimbra

Minister for the Legal Defense of the State
- In office 14 March 2014 – 23 January 2017
- President: Evo Morales

President of the Chamber of Deputies
- In office 22 January 2010 – 13 January 2012
- Preceded by: Edmundo Novillo
- Succeeded by: Rebeca Delgado

Member of the Chamber of Deputies from La Paz
- In office 22 January 2010 – 22 January 2015
- Constituency: Plurinominal

Personal details
- Born: Héctor Enrique Arce Zaconeta; 10 February 1971 (age 55) La Paz, Bolivia
- Party: MAS-IPSP
- Occupation: Lawyer

Héctor Enrique Arce Zaconeta is a Bolivian lawyer, politician, who served as the Attorney General (Spanish: Procurador General) of Bolivia. He served as a Member of the Plurinational Legislative Assembly from 2010 to 2014, representing La Paz for the Movement for Socialism.

Arce served as the President of the Chamber of Deputies from 22 January 2010 to 13 January 2012. Arce was unable to secure enough support from his party and lost reelection as President of the Chamber of Deputies to Rebeca Delgado by 25 votes.

In 2012 Arce was accused by deputy Gardenia Arauz that he as president of the lower chamber in 2011 had attempted to dissuade her from inspecting alleged tax evasion at Empresa Minera Manquiri.

He served as Minister of Justice and Institutional Transparency from 2017 up until the resignation of Evo Morales from the Presidency in 2019.

Additionally, he is the Bolivian ambassador to Trinidad and Tobago.
