= Tomasa Yarhui =

Bolivian lawyer and politician

Minister Without Portfolio for Peasant Affairs and Indigenous Peoples
- In office 5 March 2002 – 6 August 2002
- President: Jorge Quiroga
- Preceded by: Wigberto Rivero
- Succeeded by: Silvia Amparo Velarde Olmos

Personal details
- Born: Tomasa Yarhui Jacomé; 7 March 1968 (age 58) Manca Jallpa, Chuquisaca Department, Bolivia
- Party: Free Bolivia Movement; Social Democratic Power; Christian Democratic Party
- Relatives: Yesenia Yarhui (niece)
- Education: University of San Francisco Xavier
- Occupation: Lawyer, politician

Tomasa Yarhui Jacomé (born 7 March 1968) is a Bolivian lawyer and politician. She became the country's first indigenous government minister when she occupied the portfolio of Peasant Affairs and Indigenous Peoples during the government of President Jorge Quiroga on 5 March 2002.

== Biography ==
Tomasa Yarhui was born in the Quechua community Manca Jallpa, Chuquisaca Department on 7 March 1968. In 1976, she left the region to study at a school in Sucre, where she said she suffered discrimination "for being a campesina girl" – for her dress and for her economic condition. This situation forced her to return to her village at age 12 in 1980, and that was when she entered the labor movement.

At age 17, in 1985, she was departmental leader with the Bartolina Sisa Confederation, and subsequently made a foray into the Unified Syndical Confederation of Rural Workers of Bolivia (CSUTCB). She was the youngest leader of the Unified Federation of Campesinos of Chuquisaca.

From 1993 to 1995 she was responsible for public relations in Chuquisaca at the Tomás Katari Polytechnic Institute. In 1996, she won the Ten Outstanding Young Persons of the World (TOYP) political award.

Yarhui joined politics in the Free Bolivia Movement (MBL), and in 1999 she was the first indigenous woman municipal councilor of Sucre. She resigned this post after her nomination as Minister of Campesino Affairs and Indigenous and Native Peoples in the second cabinet of President Jorge Quiroga (2001–2002), replacing Wigberto Rivero and becoming the first indigenous woman to head a ministry in Bolivia.

Until August 2001 she was a member of the MBL's regional management. She was then elected alternate senator of the Social Democratic Power political front (Podemos) for Chuquisaca for the 2006–2010 term.

In parallel to her political life, Yarhui decided to further her education. She finished high school in an Adult Education Center (CEMA), studied law, and earned a master's degree in constitutional law. She graduated as a lawyer from the University of Saint Francis Xavier in Chuquisaca in 2006.

In 2014, she was a candidate for the vice presidency of the country for the Christian Democratic Party (PDC), forming a duo with Jorge Quiroga, who ran for president.

She has been the National Coordinator of Indigenous Peoples for Podemos since 2005.

== Personal life ==
Tomasa Yarhui is married and has two children. She is bilingual in Spanish and Quechua.

Political offices
Preceded by Wigberto Rivero	Minister Without Portfolio for Peasant Affairs and Indigenous Peoples; 2002	Succeeded by Silvia Amparo Velarde Olmos
