= Marcelo Elío =

Bolivian politician and journalist (1966–2020)

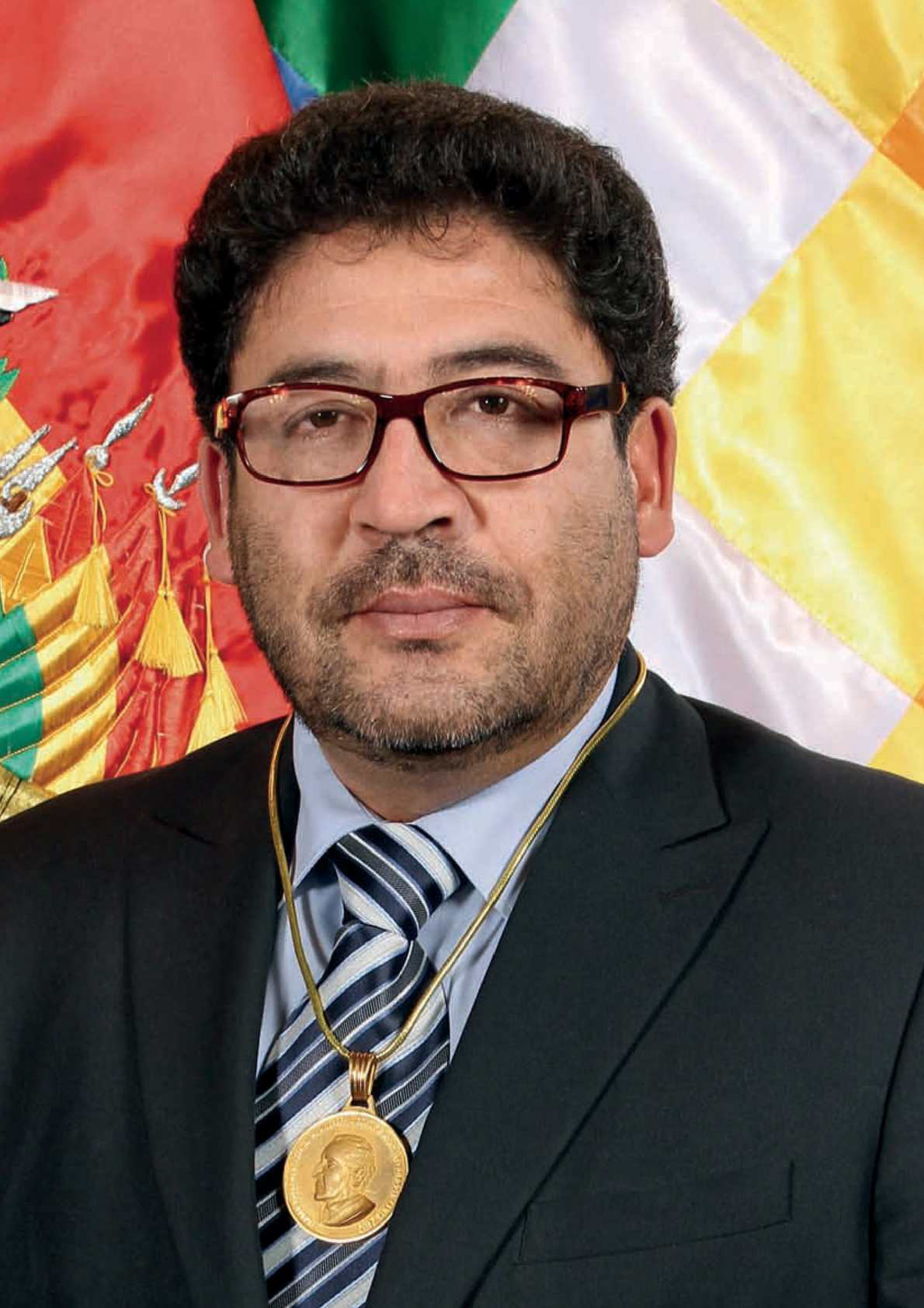

President of the Chamber of Deputies
- In office January 2014 – January 2015
- Preceded by: Betty Tejada
- Succeeded by: Gabriela Montaño

Personal details
- Born: Marcelo William Elío Chávez; 15 May 1966 Oruro
- Died: 27 July 2020 (aged 54) Oruro
- Party: Movement for Socialism

Marcelo William Elío Chavez (15 May 1966 – 27 July 2020) was a Bolivian politician and journalist.

Elío was born in Oruro, Bolivia. He was a member of the Movement for Socialism. In 2010 he was elected to the Chamber of Deputies of Bolivia. He elected as President of the Chamber of Deputies from January 2014 to January 2015. In September 2015, Elío was appointed to the Cabinet of Bolivia as deputy minister of interior. He resigned in March 2016 citing personal reasons.

Elío died in Oruro on 27 July 2020, aged 54.
