= 2014 Bolivian general election =

- 12 October 2014
- Presidential election
- Registered: 6,243,138
- Turnout: 87.90% (▼6.64pp)
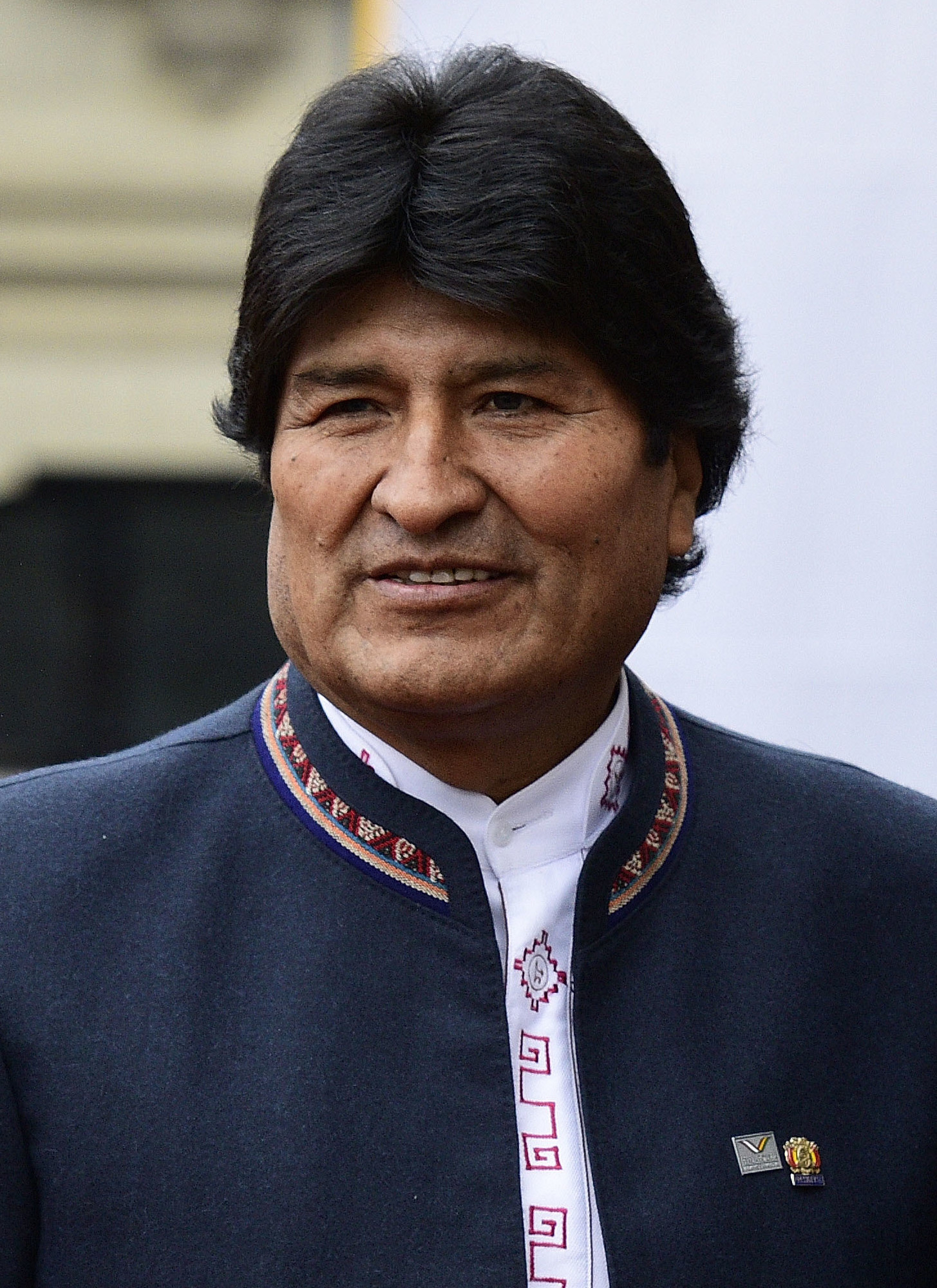

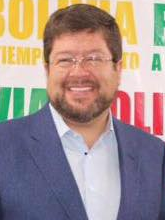

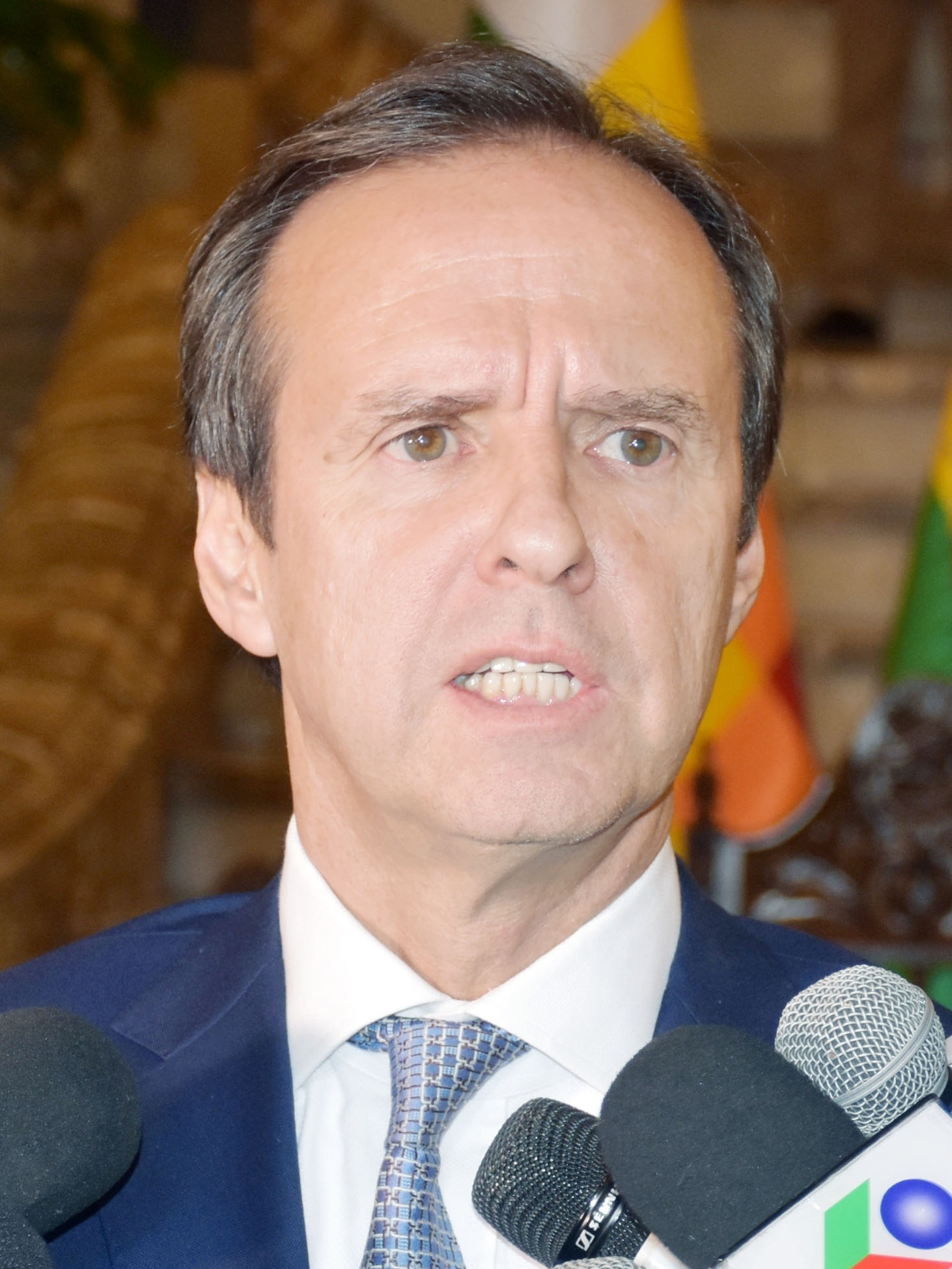
Nominee	Evo Morales	Samuel Doria Medina	Jorge Quiroga
Party	MAS-IPSP	UN	PDC
Alliance	—	UD	—
Running mate	Álvaro García Linera	Ernesto Suárez	Tomasa Yarhui
Popular vote	3,173,304	1,253,288	467,311
Percentage	61.36%	24.23%	9.04%
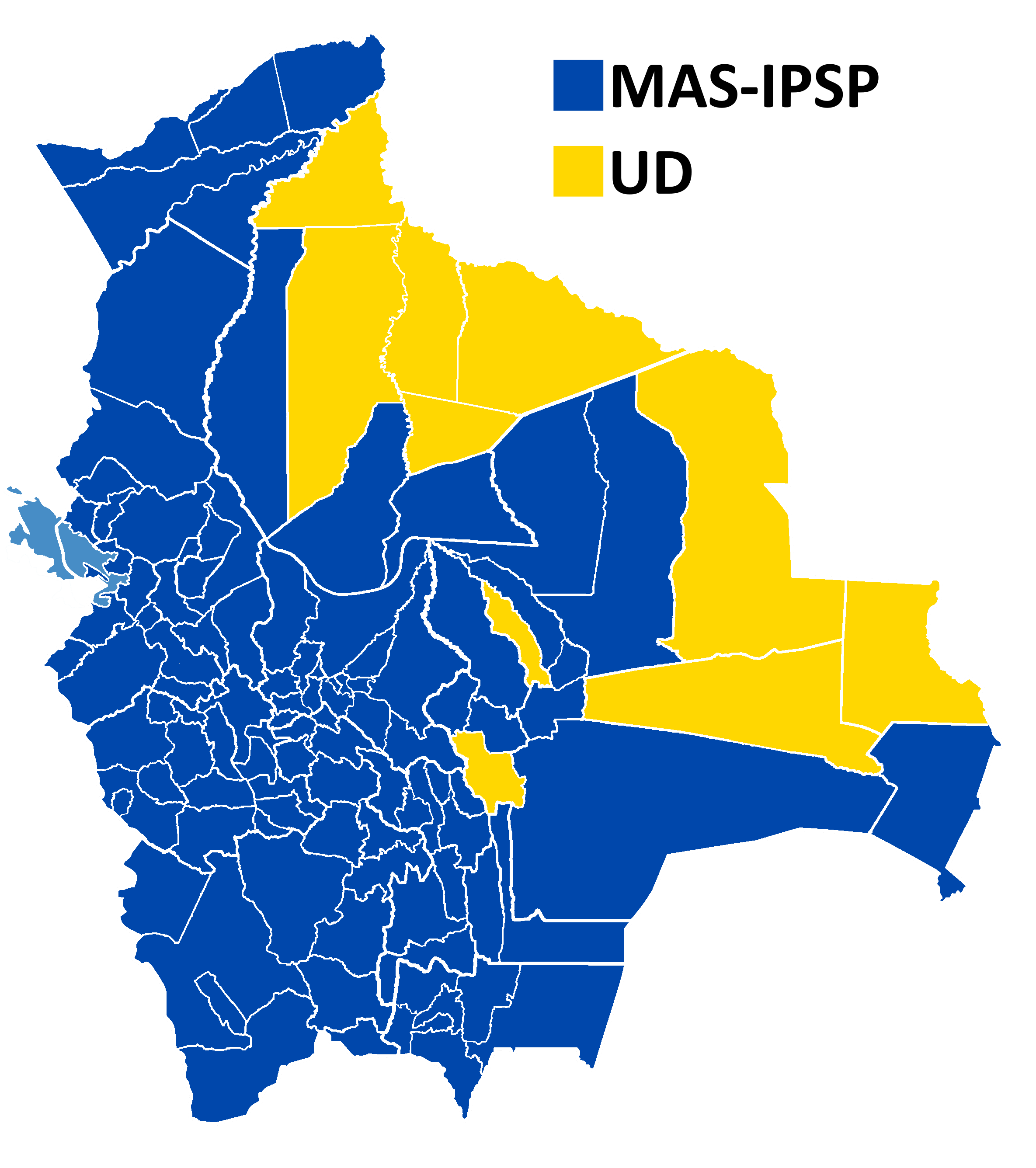
President before election
Evo Morales
MAS-IPSP
Elected President
Evo Morales
MAS-IPSP
- Legislative election
- All 36 seats in the Chamber of Senators; All 130 seats in the Chamber of Deputies
Party	Seats	+/–
Chamber of Senators
MAS-IPSP	25	−1
UD	9	+9
PDC	2	+2
Chamber of Deputies
MAS-IPSP	88	0
UD	32	+29
PDC	10	+10
This lists parties that won seats. See the complete results below.

General elections were held in Bolivia on 12 October 2014, the second to take place under the country's 2009 constitution, and the first supervised by the Plurinational Electoral Organ, a newly created fourth branch of government. Incumbent President Evo Morales was re-elected for a third term.

Bolivian voters elected the president and vice president of the republic, 130 members of the Chamber of Deputies, and 36 members of the Senate, as well as the five first directly elected deputies to the Andean Parliament.

== Background ==
In April 2013, the Supreme Court ruled that the first term of President Evo Morales did not count towards constitutional term limits as the constitution of Bolivia had since been replaced. On 20 May, Vice President Alvaro Garcia Linera signed a bill into law in the presence of MPs, members of the armed forces and Movement for Socialism representatives. He said: "President Evo Morales is constitutionally permitted to run for re-election in 2015." This was despite Morales not having made an announcement to run. Unnamed opposition leaders said they would appeal the ruling in trying to overturn it.

=== Election schedule ===
The Supreme Electoral Tribunal (TSE) said in November 2013 that it is considering holding the election in October 2014, so any second round of presidential voting could take place in December, the traditional month for presidential elections. The TSE formally convened the election for 12 October 2014. Registration for new voters opened on 10 May and ran through to 9 June. Formal inter-party alliances needed to be finalized by July 14 to appear on the ballot. Campaign advertising was permitted only from 12 September to 8 October. Bolivia observes limits on electoral activity in the days immediately preceding an election, and special restrictions on election day.

== Electoral system ==
The president was elected using a modified form of the two-round system; a candidate would be elected in the first round if they received over 50% of the vote, or if they received over 40% of the vote and were at least 10 percentage points ahead of their nearest rival. If neither threshold were, a run-off was planned for 7 December.

The 130 members in the Chamber of Deputies (Cámara de Diputados) are elected using a seat linkage based mixed compensatory system using two votes: 63 deputies are elected by first-preference plurality to represent single-member electoral districts, 60 are elected by closed list party-list proportional representation from party lists on a departmental basis (in districts of varying sizes corresponding to Bolivia's nine departments with a threshold of 3%). The list seats in each region are awarded proportionally based on the vote for the presidential candidates, subtracting the number of single-member districts won (to provide mixed-member proportional representation). The remaining seven seats are reserved indigenous seats elected by the usos y costumbres. A voter can only vote in one of either the normal constituencies or special constituencies (coexistence). Party lists are required to alternate between men and women, and in the single-member districts, men are required to run with a female alternate, and vice versa. At least 50% of the deputies from single-member districts are required to be women.

The Chamber of Senators (Cámara de Senadores) has 36 members, four from each the country's nine departments, which are also elected using closed party-lists, using the D'Hondt method. The senate seats are also awarded based on the vote for president.

The election uses the same votes to elect the President (first round), the Chamber and the Senate, making it a double (triple) simultaneous vote. Voters may therefore not split their ticket between these elections, but they may vote for a candidate of a different list in the election of the Chamber as the deputies from the single-member districts are elected using separate votes.

Each candidate was required to have an elected alternate from the same party. All candidate lists had to alternate between men and women; in the uninominal districts, the alternates were required to be from the opposite gender.

Department	Total deputies	Uninominal deputies	Plurinominal deputies	Indigenous or Campesino deputies	Senators
La Paz	29	14	14	1	4
Santa Cruz	28	14	13	1	4
Cochabamba	19	9	9	1	4
Potosí	13	7	6	0	4
Chuquisaca	10	5	5	0	4
Oruro	9	4	4	1	4
Tarija	9	4	4	1	4
Beni	8	4	3	1	4
Pando	5	2	2	1	4
Total	130	63	60	7	36
Source: Ley de distribución de escaños entre departamentos

== Parties and candidates ==
Five parties (including one party alliance) contested the presidential elections.

=== Movement for Socialism ===
Sitting President Evo Morales Ayma and Vice President Álvaro García Linera were seeking re-election, following victories in 2005 and 2009. Their candidacy was endorsed by the Movement for Socialism – Political Instrument for the Sovereignty of the Peoples (MAS-IPSP) at its 18th anniversary gathering in March 2013 and its Seventh General Congress in October 2013.

=== Without Fear Movement ===
The center-left Without Fear Movement (MSM) nominated party founder, and 2000–2010 Mayor of La Paz Juan del Granado as its candidate for president on November 11, 2013. Both the party and its candidate were allies with the first Evo Morales administration, and the MSM ran on a joint slate with the MAS-IPSP in the 2009 election, but the alliance ruptured shortly afterwards.

=== Democratic Unity Coalition ===
The largest opposition parties—the Democrats (MDS), National Unity Front (UN; convener of the Broad Front), and Without Fear Movement—held a variety of talks discussing possible alliances from late 2013 through June 2014. On June 17, the Democrats and National Unity announced the formation of the Democratic Unity coalition. UD's candidates for president and vice president were UN leader Samuel Doria Medina and Ernesto Suárez, respectively. Suárez is the former governor of Beni and leader of the Beni First party, which collaborated in the formation of the MDS.

==== Democrat Social Movement ====
Rubén Costas, governor of Santa Cruz department, founded the Democrat Social Movement to contest the 2014 elections. The party fused Costas' Truth and Social Democracy (VERDES) party, Renewing Freedom and Democracy (Libertad y Democracia Renovadora; LIDER), and Popular Consensus, although the merger was not legally recognized. Costas was chosen as the party's presidential nominee at its National Congress on December 15, 2013. However, the party entered into an alliance with the National Unity Front, and supported the latter group's candidate Samuel Doria Medina.

==== Broad Front ====
National Unity Front, the party led by Samuel Doria Medina, named its alliance for 2014 the Broad Front (Spanish: Frente Amplio). Doria Medina, a presidential candidate in 2005 and 2009, was the presumed candidate for the Front for months. On December 23, 2013, the Broad Front and the Revolutionary Nationalist Movement (MNR) signed an agreement to present a common candidate, to be selected by an internal primary election. Leaders of both parties said they were seeking a coalition with the Democrats and the Without Fear Movement.

On April 19–20, 2014, the Broad Front held a poll of its members in the nine departmental capitals of Bolivia. Doria Medina received a majority of 69% among the 2,652 people polled, making him the party's official presidential candidate. Other candidates participating were: indigenous leader Rafael Quispe of CONAMAQ, political scientist Jimena Costa and MNR faction leader Erick Morón. While the party did not officially announce the vote totals received by other contenders, the newspaper La Razón reported that Costa received 14%, Quispe 10%, and Morón 6%.

=== Christian Democratic Party ===
Former president Jorge Fernando "Tuto" Quiroga Ramírez was the candidate of the Christian Democratic Party, which had recently been part of the PODEMOS opposition front. His running mate was Tomasa Yarhui, a lawyer and former Minister of Campesino Affairs.

=== Green Party ===
The Green Party, led by Margot Soria Saravia and affiliated with the Global Greens, sealed an alliance with the National Council of Ayllus and Markas of Qullasuyu (CONAMAQ) to campaign jointly for the 2014 elections. CONAMAQ leader Rafael Quispe had considered heading the ticket, but he publicly stated that his organization's goal is not to win the presidency but to gain independent representation in the Plurinational Assembly: "God willing I am wrong, but I don't think that we will arrive to power yet in 2014, as we have discussed [among ourselves]. We could put in assembly members and those assembly members will have to work for a Plurinational State and in [the] 2019 [elections] we would arrive in power to transform the Colonial State into a Plurinational State." The Confederation of Indigenous Peoples of Bolivia separately committed to contest the elections in alliance with CONAMAQ, and independently of the MAS and other major parties (Without Fear, National Unity, or Social Democrat).

On June 26, the Green Party finalized its candidates: Fernando Vargas, leader of the indigenous communities of the Isiboro Sécure National Park and Indigenous Territory for president, and Margot Soria Saravia for vice president.

=== Other alliances among parties ===
Official alliances between parties allow for joint candidates and ballot lines. These must be finalized by the July 14 deadline for candidacies. Aside from the Democratic Unity coalition, other political forces engaged in alliance talks.

The largest opposition parties—the Democrats (MDS), National Unity Front (UN; convener of the Broad Front), and Without Fear Movement—held a variety of talks discussing possible alliances from late 2013 through June 2014. In the end, the Democrats and National Unity were able to reach an agreement, while the Without Fear Movement remained separate.

Seven smaller parties—Revolutionary Nationalist Movement, Nationalist Democratic Action, New Republican Force, Civic Solidarity Union, Front for Victory, Andean Amazonic Power, and Colla Power—reported progress towards a common alliance on June 18. The bloc would be called United for Bolivia (Unidos por Bolivia), and a congressional deputy involved in alliance talks promised it would be finalized on June 25. Several of these parties—Nationalist Democratic Action, New Republican Force, the faction of the Revolutionary Nationalist Movement led by Johnny Torres, as well the Revolutionary Left Movement (MIR), Bolivian Socialist Falange (FSB), and New Citizen Power (NPC)—threw their support behind the Christian Democrats and candidate Jorge Tuto Quiroga.

=== Eligible parties ===
As of November 2013, the Supreme Electoral Tribunal deemed twelve political parties eligible to participate in the election at a national level:

- Nationalist Democratic Action (ADN)
- Revolutionary Left Front (FRI)
- Revolutionary Nationalist Movement (MNR),
- Christian Democratic Party (Bolivia) (PDC)
- Movement for Socialism (MAS)
- Civic Solidarity Union (UCS)
- Without Fear Movement (MSM),
- National Unity Front (UN)
- Plan Progress for Bolivia (PPB)
- Front for Victory (FPV)
- Green Party of Bolivia (PVB)
- Popular Consensus (CP)

Eleven further applications were still being considered as of November 9, 2013.

== Policy issues ==
=== Energy policy ===
The incumbent MAS-IPSP has proposed building a nuclear power plant, while the opposition Christian Democrats and Without Fear Movement oppose the development of nuclear energy. The Christian Democrats describe the move as dangerous and likely to generate international opposition, while the Without Fear Movement describes a power plant as a megaproject "that will leave nothing for the people."

== Opinion polls ==
An unnamed poll in April 2013 suggested in an hypothetical race Morales would get 41% and Samuel Doria Medina would get 17% of the vote. A poll conducted by Página Siete in February 2014 showed Morales would get 45.7% of the vote, Medina would get 13.4%, Rubén Costas would get 9%, and Juan del Granado would get 4%. According to poll conducted by Ipsos in August 2014 Evo Morales would get 59% and Samuel Doria Medina would get 17% of the vote.

== Results ==
=== President ===
Candidate	Running mate	Party	Votes	%
Evo Morales	Álvaro García Linera	Movement for Socialism	3,173,304	61.36
Samuel Doria Medina	Ernesto Suárez	Democratic Unity	1,253,288	24.23
Jorge Quiroga	Tomasa Yarhui	Christian Democratic Party	467,311	9.04
Juan del Granado	Adriana Gil	Fearless Movement	140,285	2.71
Fernando Vargas	Margot Soria Saravia	Green Party of Bolivia	137,240	2.65
Total			5,171,428	100.00
Valid votes			5,171,428	94.24
Invalid votes			208,061	3.79
Blank votes			108,187	1.97
Total votes			5,487,676	100.00
Registered voters/turnout			6,243,138	87.90
Source: TSE

=== Chamber of Deputies ===
Party	Proportional			Constituency			Indigenous			Total seats	+/–
Party	Votes	%	Seats	Votes	%	Seats	Votes	%	Seats	Total seats	+/–
Movement for Socialism	3,057,618	61.01	33	2,181,324	52.24	49	22,851	70.86	6	88	0
Democratic Unity	1,228,634	24.52	19	1,129,826	27.06	12	6,834	21.19	1	32	–
Christian Democratic Party	454,233	9.06	8	390,118	9.34	2	218	0.68	0	10	–
Fearless Movement	135,997	2.71	0	317,699	7.61	0	1,324	4.11	0	0	–4
Green Party of Bolivia	134,906	2.69	0	156,784	3.75	0	1,021	3.17	0	0	–
Total	5,011,388	100.00	60	4,175,751	100.00	63	32,248	100.00	7	130	0
Valid votes	5,011,388	94.21		4,175,751	79.38		32,248	65.57			
Invalid votes	201,485	3.79		160,659	3.05		1,460	2.97			
Blank votes	106,268	2.00		924,131	17.57		15,471	31.46			
Total votes	5,319,141	100.00		5,260,541	100.00		49,179	100.00			
Registered voters/turnout	5,971,152	89.08		5,942,671	88.52		113,634	43.28			
Source: OEP

=== Chamber of Senators ===
Party	Votes	%	Seats	+/–
Movement for Socialism	3,057,618	61.01	25	–1
Democratic Unity	1,228,634	24.52	9	–
Christian Democratic Party	454,233	9.06	2	–
Fearless Movement	135,997	2.71	0	–
Green Party of Bolivia	134,906	2.69	0	–
Total	5,011,388	100.00	36	0
Valid votes	5,011,388	94.21		
Invalid votes	201,485	3.79		
Blank votes	106,268	2.00		
Total votes	5,319,141	100.00		
Registered voters/turnout	5,971,152	89.08		
Source: TSE
