= Juan del Granado =

Bolivian politician (born 1953)

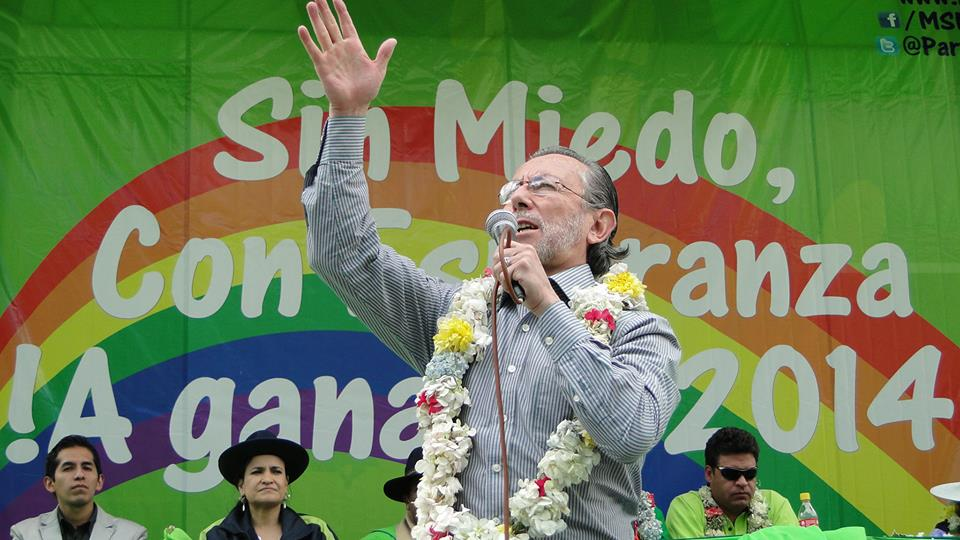

Mayor of La Paz
- In office 13 January 2005 – 31 May 2010
- Preceded by: Roberto Moscoso (acting)
- Succeeded by: Luis Revilla
- In office 6 February 2000 – 4 October 2004
- Preceded by: Lupe Andrade
- Succeeded by: Roberto Moscoso (acting)

Member of the Chamber of Deputies from La Paz
- In office 2 August 1997 – 6 February 2000
- Substitute: Wilfredo Calzada
- Preceded by: Circumscription established
- Succeeded by: Wilfredo Calzada
- Constituency: Circumscription 10 (La Paz)
- In office 2 August 1993 – 2 August 1997
- Substitute: Antonio Meruva
- Preceded by: Gonzalo Quiroga
- Succeeded by: Position abolished
- Constituency: Party list

Personal details
- Born: Juan Fernando del Granado Cosío; 26 March 1953 (age 73) La Paz, Bolivia
- Party: Fearless Movement (1999–2014)
- Other political affiliations: Revolutionary Left Movement (1971–1984); Revolutionary Left Movement – Mass Front (1984–1991); Free Bolivia Movement (1991–1999)
- Spouse: Marcela Revollo (m. 1989)
- Education: Higher University of San Andrés
- Occupation: Lawyer; politician

Juan Fernando del Granado Cosío (born 26 March 1953), often referred to as Juan Sin Miedo, is a Bolivian human rights lawyer and politician who served as mayor of La Paz from 2000 to 2004 and 2005 to 2010. A member of the Fearless Movement, of which he was leader, he previously served as a member of the Chamber of Deputies from La Paz from 1993 to 1999.

Del Granado gained notoriety for achieving in 1993 the first-ever successful prosecution of a Latin American dictator in the ordinary courts for crimes committed in office. Bolivia’s Supreme Court sentenced Gen. Luis García Meza Tejada, the "cocaine dictator," to 30 years in jail without parole or remission for murder, theft, fraud and subverting the constitution. Despite its brevity, Garcia Meza's rule became notorious for its links to the cocaine trade and its use of paramilitary squads run by fascist mercenaries from Italy, Germany, France, Chile and Argentina. At least 50 people died, over 20 disappeared and thousands were arrested, imprisoned and tortured before it fell to a coup by dissident officers in August 1981. The best-known of his foreign aides was the Nazi war criminal Klaus Barbie, who was extradited to France in 1983, where he died in jail. As a prosecutor, del Granado was demonstrably fearless in the pursuit of justice, and shrugged off continual death threats.

He is a relative of Bolivian poet Javier del Granado. His wife, Marcela Revollo, served as an MSM deputy in the Plurinational Legislative Assembly.

== Biography ==
Juan del Granado received a law degree at the Universidad Mayor de San Andrés (UMSA) in La Paz. As a law student, he was among the founders of the Movimiento de Izquierda Revolucionaria (MIR). He directed the Committee Interfacultativo UMSA, a body that defended the university's autonomy during the brutal dictatorship of Col. Hugo Banzer. Despite a climate of harsh political repression, he completed his studies and received his law degree in 1975. He continued his political activities and associations in North Potosi, where from 1975 to 1976 he worked as a journalist for Radio La Voz del Minero (The Miner's Voice Radio) and served as legal counsel to the Catavi and 20th-century mining unions. Toward the end of the corruption- and violence-plagued Banzer dictatorship, del Granado was imprisoned and then exiled. In 1980, when he was able to return to La Paz, he served as legal counsel to the Central Obrera Boliviana (COB) and several unions and social organizations. He was again driven into exile during the brutal "narco-dictatorship" of Gen. Luis García Meza Tejada (1980–81).

In 1984, he undertook the prosecution of Meza Tejada, a process that would last more than nearly a decade. On 21 April 1993, Bolivia’s Supreme Court found Meza Tejada guilty of murder, theft, fraud and subverting the constitution, and sentenced him to 30 years in prison. Sixteen members of his Cabinet and 42 paramilitary and civilian collaborators were also tried, eleven in absentia. Six were acquitted and the others were given sentences up to 30 years. President Jaime Paz Zamora said the verdict symbolized the "recovery of the country's dignity and the strengthening of the democratic system." "It is not only a question of punishing those responsible for crimes but of ending political actions based on murder, assault and theft," said del Granado. Gen. Luis García Meza Tejada had staged a coup on July 17, 1980 with the backing of cocaine traffickers, Nazi war criminal Klaus Barbie and foreign mercenaries, who killed, tortured and persecuted labor and political leaders and journalists. They had overthrown a democratically elected government, dissolved Congress and outlawed political parties.

In 1993, del Granado was elected to Congress as a member of the party Movimiento Bolivia Libre. As a congressman, he served as the Chairman of the Human Rights Committee, where he was a tireless voice in defense of human rights. He also served on the Constitutional Committee, where he called for the enactment of laws which prompted the creation of Bolivia’s Ombudsman, the Constitutional Court and the Judicial Council.

He has been a member of the Andean Commission of Jurists since 1996. He has published several books, analyses and reports on government transparency and has received several awards from human rights institutions and civil society.

In 1999, he founded the Movement without Fear (Movimiento Sin Miedo); the party won La Paz's municipal elections that year. A tireless advocate of accountability and oversight, mayor del Granado cleaned up the city government and fought corruption. He also implemented major projects in the city. In 2004, he cruised to re-election, and his supporters won six of the eleven city council seats.

He was succeeded as Mayor by Luis Revilla on 31 May 2010.

After a long period out of political office, del Granado had his party, the MSM, join the Unity coalition of presidential candidate Samuel Doria Medina ahead of the 2025 Bolivian general election, and was subsequently elected to the Chamber of Deputies with the MSM.

== Sources ==
- Marcela López Levy, Bolivia: the background, the issues, the people p. 63 (2001).
- Arellano, César (8 October 2014). "Por un modelo de economía plural". Los Tiempos. Archived from the original on 3 March 2016.

Chamber of Deputies of Bolivia
Preceded by Gonzalo Quiroga	Member of the Chamber of Deputies from La Paz; 1993–1997	Position abolished
Circumscription established	Member of the Chamber of Deputies from La Paz circumscription 10; 1997–2000	Succeeded by Wilfredo Calzada
Political offices
Preceded by Lupe Andrade	Mayor of La Paz; 2000–2004	Succeeded by Roberto Moscoso; Acting
Preceded by Roberto Moscoso; Acting	Mayor of La Paz; 2005–2010	Succeeded by Luis Revilla
