= Fernando Vargas Mosua =

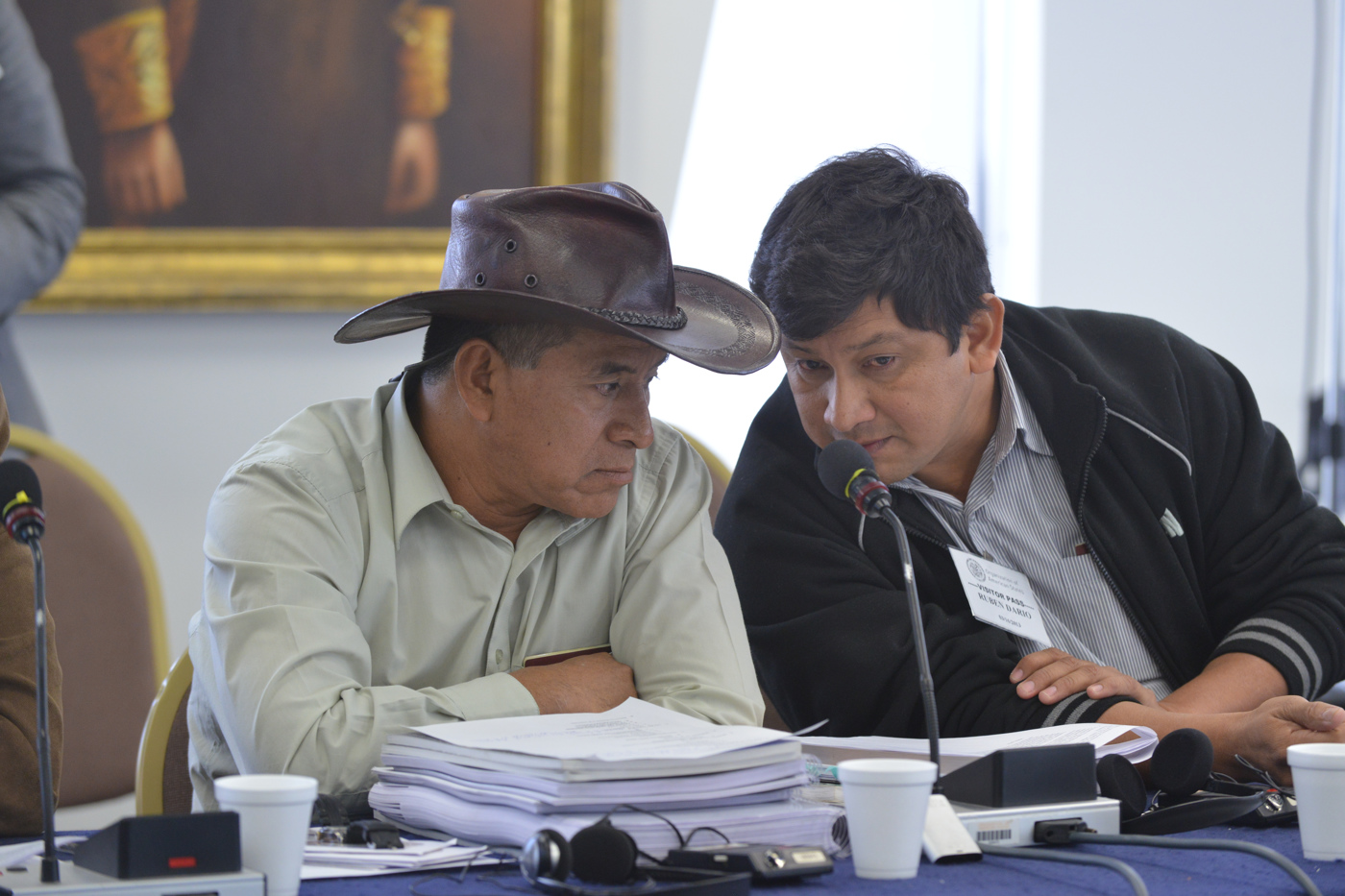
Fernando Vargas (left) and CIDOB President Adolfo Chávez presenting a complaint concerning human rights abuses before the Inter-American Commission on Human Rights in Washington, DC, in March 2013

Fernando Vargas Mosua is a Bolivian indigenous leader who served as general executive director of the Indigenous Development Fund. Vargas headed the Subcentral TIPNIS, the indigenous authority which holds title to the Isiboro Sécure National Park and Indigenous Territory (TIPNIS), from 15 August 2011 to 30 November 2016.

Vargas is a member of the Moxeño Trinitario indigenous people and was born in the village of Paraíso, located on the Sécure River in what was then the Isiboro Sécure National Park. In 1990, the murder of his nephew Roy Jou Vargas at six years of age in a conflict occasioned by a non-indigenous landowner, propelled him into public activism. Vargas became leader of Paraíso, a technical member of the Subcentral, and in 2011, its president.

During Vargas' term as leader, the TIPNIS indigenous community was engaged in an extended campaign against the building of the Villa Tunari–San Ignacio de Moxos Highway through the territory, a project championed by President Evo Morales. Vargas was one of the leaders of 2011 and 2012 marches by the Confederation of Indigenous Peoples of Bolivia (CIDOB) against the project. The 2011 march won the passage of a law to protect the territory by declaring it an "intangible zone." However, in 2012 the Bolivian government carried out a disputed consultation process, and concluded that intangibility should be lifted and the roadway proceed. In 2013, Vargas brought a complaint against the government before the Inter-American Commission on Human Rights.

Vargas was a candidate for the Green Party in the 2014 presidential election, with the party's leader and founder Margot Soria Saravia serving as vice presidential candidate. With 24,685 out of 27,403 polling stations having reported in the Green Party had gained 126,958 votes in the presidential elections, a total of 2.79%.

In June 2020, Minister of Rural Development and Lands Beatriz Capobianco designated Vargas the General Executive Director of the Indigenous Development Fund, where he succeeded Rafael Quispe; he assumed the office in early July.
