= Higher University of San Simón =

University in Cochabamba, Bolivia

Coordinates: 17°23′36″S 66°08′42″W

University rankings

Regional – Overall
- QS Latin America: 201-250 (2021)

The Higher University of San Simón (Universidad Mayor de San Simón, UMSS) is a university in Cochabamba, Bolivia.

It was founded by Mariscal Andrés de Santa Cruz on November 5, 1832 (193 years ago) and is one of the first universities founded in Bolivia after the University of San Francisco Xavier from Chuquisaca and the University of San Andrés from La Paz. The university offers 99 undergraduate programs in 18 faculties that are mainly established in Cochabamba city. According to uniRank, the University of San Simón ranks second among Bolivian universities, and second according to Webometrics and the QS World University Rankings.
