= Fearless Movement =

Political party in Bolivia

Fearless Movement Movimiento Sin Miedo
- Leader: Juan Del Granado
- Founded: 1 March 1999
- Split from: Revolutionary Left Movement
- Succeeded by: Sovereignty and Liberty Party
- Headquarters: La Paz, Bolivia
- Ideology: Democratic socialism Progressivism
- Political position: Centre-left
- National affiliation: Unity Bloc
- Deputies: 1 / 130
- Senate: 0 / 36

The Fearless Movement (in Spanish: Movimiento Sin Miedo; MSM) is a progressive political party in Bolivia. MSM was founded on March 1, 1999 and dissolved following the 2014 Bolivian general election. It was relaunched in July 2025.

The leader of the party, Juan del Granado, was the mayor of La Paz from 2000 to 2010. The party won mayoral elections in 2010 in both La Paz and Oruro.

MSM entered into a political alliance with the Movement for Socialism (MAS-IPSP) on September 3, 2005 in advance of the 2005 presidential election. The parties also consolidated their efforts during the 2006 election for the Constituent Assembly, in support of President Evo Morales during the 2008 Bolivian recall election, and finally in a joint legislative slate in the 2009 general election.

== Elected officials ==
=== Plurinational Legislative Assembly ===
MSM poster during the 2008 referendum campaign, illustrating the party's embrace of the "process of change" and critical stance towards the successes and limitations of MAS rule. Banner text: "Yes to the process of change / Fearless Movement with Evo"

Four members of MSM were elected to serve in the lower house of Bolivia's Congress when the party was in alliance with the MAS-IPSP: Javier Zavaleta, Marcela Revollo, Fabián Yaksic, and Samuel Pamuri. The last three of those were elected to uninominal seats. As part of a break between the MSM and its ally the Movement for Socialism (MAS-IPSP), the party's four deputies, elected on the MAS slate left the MAS ranks and pledged in late March 2010, "to act in accord with our political identity, with our conscience, and with the people who elected us with their vote." However, Samuel Pamuri quickly pledged his allegiance to the MAS-IPSP by April 2010. Javier Zavaleta distanced himself from the Fearless Movement as well, culminating in his formal detachment in February 2011.

MAS-IPSP deputies have repeatedly threatened to remove the remaining deputies from their seats for non-adherence to their elected slate. In January 2012, the Fearless Movement proposed that the five uninominal seats representing the city of La Paz (including Zavaleta, Revollo, Yaksic, and Pamuri, as well as Guillermo Torres of the MAS-IPSP) be subjected to a recall referendum, thereby confirming or rejecting their current party allegiances.

=== Municipal officials ===
In the departmental and municipal elections on 4 April 2010, the MSM participated in 176 contests, winning the mayor's office in 21 municipalities. Luis Revilla won the municipality of La Paz, which marked the third time that the Fearless Movement has won a mayoral race. Also, Rossío Pimentel Flores, from the MSM, carried the municipality of Oruro, something unexpected, since the Movement for Socialism has enjoyed strong support from that city. The MSM has consolidated itself since then strongly in opposition to the ruling party.

=== Presidential candidacy, 2014 ===
After President Evo Morales suggested he would run for re-election in 2014, Juan del Granado, the leader of the Fearless Movement, led the party to challenge its former ally, the Movement for Socialism, to submit Morales' proposal to a constitutional referendum. Simultaneously, del Granado stated that the MSM would present a candidate for president. On November 11, 2013, the MSM nominated del Granado as its candidate for president in the 2014 general elections. The results gave del Grando less than 3% of the vote, causing the party to lose its legal status. As a result, many of its members founded the Sovereignty and Liberty Party (Soberanía y Libertad, SOL.BO) led by Luis Revilla.

=== 2025 general election ===
In July 2025, del Granado relaunched the party with the intention of contesting the 2025 Bolivian general election.

== Election results ==
=== Presidential elections ===
Election	Presidential nominee	Votes	%	Votes	%	Result
Election	Presidential nominee	First round		Second round		Result
2005	Evo Morales (MAS)	1,544,374	53.74%			Elected ✓
2009	Evo Morales (MAS)	2,943,209	64.22%			Elected ✓
2014	Juan del Granado	140,285	2.71%			Lost ✗
2019	Did not contest					
2020	Did not contest					
2025	Samuel Doria Medina (UN)	1,054,568	19.69%			Lost ✓

=== Chamber of Deputies and Senate elections ===
Election	Party leader	Votes	%	Chamber seats	+/-	Position	Senate seats	+/-	Position	Status
2005	Evo Morales	As part of MAS		2 / 130	▲2	▲1st	0 / 36	0	▲1st	Government
2009	Evo Morales	As part of MAS		4 / 130	▲2	▲1st	0 / 36	0	▲1st	Government
2014	Juan del Granado	135,997	2.71%	0 / 130	New	▲4th	0 / 36	New	▲4th	Extra-parliamentary
2019	Did not contest			0 / 130	0	—	0 / 36	0	—	Annulled
2020	Did not contest			0 / 130	0	—	0 / 36	0	—	Extra-parliamentary
2025	Juan del Granado	As part of Unity		1 / 130	▲1	▲3rd	0 / 36	0	▲3rd	Opposition

== See also ==
- List of political parties in Bolivia
