= Ministry of the Presidency (Bolivia) =

Bolivian executive department

Agency overview
- Formed: 6 August 1989; 37 years ago
- Preceding agency: General Secretariat of the Presidency
- Type: Ministry
- Jurisdiction: Government of Bolivia
- Headquarters: Casa Grande del Pueblo; Central Zone, Ayacucho Street - esq. Potosí, La Paz, Bolivia; 16°29′45″S 68°08′01″W
- Agency executive: María Nela Prada, Minister
- Child agencies: Vice Ministry of Coordination and Government Management; Vice Ministry of Coordination with Social Movements and Civil Society; Vice Ministry of Autonomies; Vice Ministry of Communication
- Website: www.presidencia.gob.bo

The Ministry of the Presidency (Spanish: Ministerio de la Presidencia) is the department of the Government of Bolivia that provides support to the presidential administration by coordinating its political-administrative actions with the different ministries as well as the legislative, judicial, and electoral branches of government in addition to social sectors and cooperatives. Aside from these tasks, the ministry acts as the chief custodian of the government, filing all laws, decrees, and resolutions and publishing them in the Official Gazette of Bolivia.

Established on 6 August 1989 by Presidential Decree N° 22292 issued by President Jaime Paz Zamora, the office was previously known as the General Secretariat of the Presidency. The first official under the newly elevated ministry was Gustavo Fernández Saavedra, appointed on the same day.

== Administration ==
María Nela Prada is the incumbent minister, appointed on 9 November 2020. The minister is charged with the appointment of four vice ministers. The current incumbents are: Freddy Bobaryn, Juan Villca, Álvaro Ruiz García, and Gabriela Alcón.

Portfolio	Minister	Party	Prof.	Took office	Term	Ref.
Minister of the Presidency	María Nela Prada	MAS	Dip.	9 November 2020	2,099	
Vice Minister of Coordination and Government Management	Freddy Bobaryn	MAS	Poli.	13 November 2020	2,095	
Vice Minister of Coordination with Social Movements and Civil Society	Juan Villca	MAS	Uni.	12 November 2020	2,096	
Vice Minister of Autonomies	Álvaro Ruiz García	MAS	Law.	14 May 2021	1,913	
Vice Minister of Communication	Gabriela Alcón	MAS	Jrnl.	12 November 2020	2,096	

== Organization ==
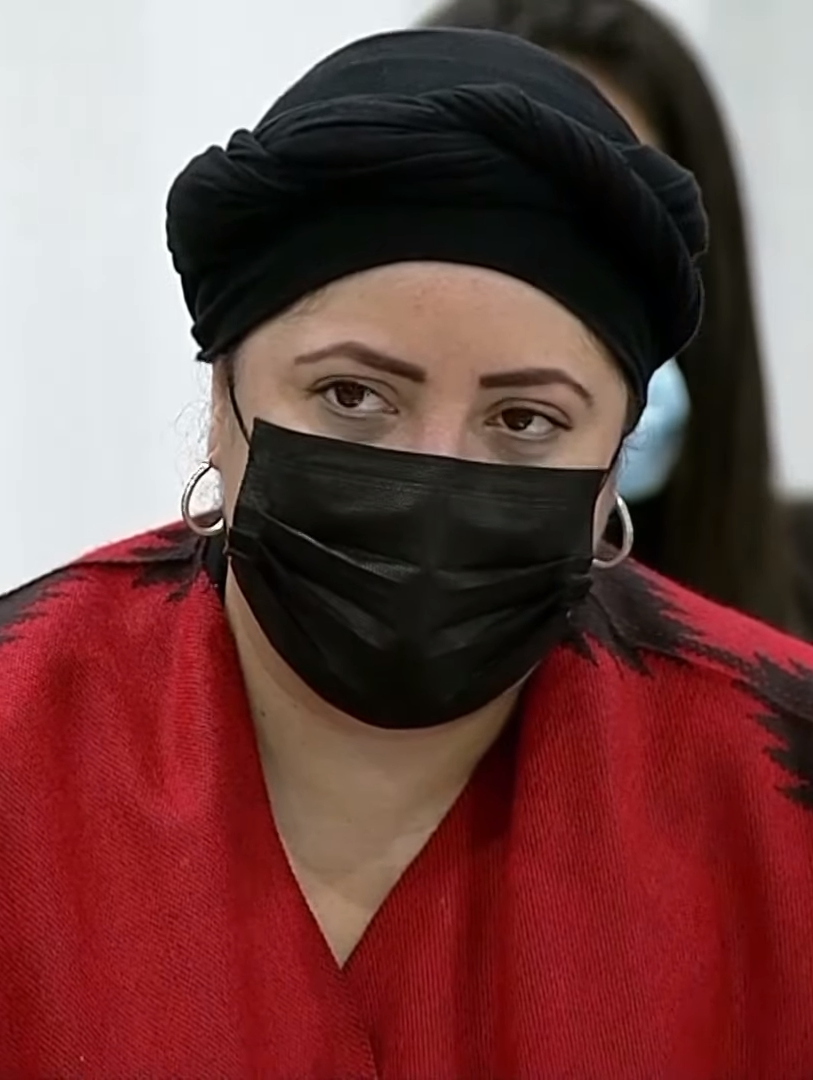
María Nela Prada, current minister of the presidency.

- Ministry of the Presidency
  - Advice and Administrative Support
    - General Directorate of Planning
    - General Directorate of Administrative Affairs
      - Financial Unit
      - Technologies Information and Communication Unit
      - Administrative Unit
      - Administrative Management Support Unit
      - Human Resources Unit
    - General Directorate of Legal Affairs
      - General Archive and Institutional Memory Unit
      - Legal Management Unit
      - Legal Analysis Unit
      - Agrarian Advisory Unit
    - Chief of Staff of the Minister
    - Social Communication Unit
    - Social Management Support Unit
    - Internal Audit Unit
    - Transparency and Fight against Corruption Unit
    - Property Management Unit
  - Substantive Level
    - Vice Ministry of Coordination and Government Management
      - General Directorate of Plurinational Legislative Management
        - Constitutional Analysis Unit
        - Management and Parliamentary monitoring Unit
      - General Directorate of Plurinational Public Management
        - Public Management Unit
    - Vice Ministry of Coordination with Social Movements and Civil Society
      - General Directorate of Coordination with Movements Social and Civil Society
        - Social Demand Management Unit
        - Monitoring and National Analysis Unit
        - Strengthening Social Organizations Unit
        - Support for Social Public Policy Technical Unit
    - Vice Ministry of Autonomies
      - General Directorate of Autonomies
        - Departmental and Municipal Autonomies Unit
        - Urban Areas and Metropolization Unit
      - General Directorate of Territorial Organization
        - Regional and Indigenous Autonomies Unit
        - Limits and Territorial Organization Unit
    - Vice Ministry of Communication
      - General Directorate of Communicational Policies
        - Studies and Projects Unit
        - Social Networking Unit
        - Communicational Strategies Unit
        - Governmental Information Unit
      - General Directorate of Communicational Management
        - State Media Unit
          - Information and State Documentation and Newspaper Library
          - Bolivia Newspaper
          - Radio Illimani - New Homeland Network
          - Bolivian National Agency (ABI)
          - Radios of the Indigenous towns
        - Districts Unit
        - ENTB in Settlement
        - Presidential Communication Unit
  - Deconcentrated Units
    - Official Gazette of Bolivia
    - Analysis Unit
    - National Fund for Solidarity and Equity Executive Unit
    - Special Projects Unit (UPRE)
  - Decentralized Units
    - Technical Office for Strengthening the Public Enterprise (OFEP)
    - Electronic Government and Information and Communication Technologies Agency (AGETIC)
    - State Autonomy Service (SEA)
  - Strategic Companies
    - Bolivia TV
    - Editorial of the Plurinational State of Bolivia

== See also ==
- Cabinet of Bolivia
