= List of senators of Santa Cruz =

Santa Cruz is represented in the Plurinational Legislative Assembly by four senators and their alternates elected through proportional representation. They serve five-year terms and qualify for reelection once. The current delegation is composed of two senators from Creemos and two senators from the Movement for Socialism: Centa Rek, Henry Montero, Soledad Flores, and Isidoro Quispe. Their respective alternates are: Erik Morón, Paola Fernández, William Torrez, and María Muñoz.

Even though the bicameral system was adopted in the 1831 Constitution and continued in subsequently promulgated constitutions, it can be affirmed that, with the exception of very small intervals, the Senate did not, in fact, exercise its functions until the convocation of the 1882 legislature. Furthermore, due to heavy political instability and frequent military interventions since 1882, Bolivia did not experience a continuous, uninterrupted, legislative session until 1982.

== List of senators ==
| Legislature | P. | Term of office | | Titular Senator | Party | Alternate Senator (Note: Unless otherwise indicated, all alternates share a party/alliance with their titular senator.) | Term of office | | E. | Ref. | |
| Legislature | P. | Took office | Left office | Titular Senator | Party | Alternate Senator | Took office | Left office | E. | Sen. | Alt. |
|---|---|---|---|---|---|---|---|---|---|---|---|
| 1979–1980 (Note: The term of this legislature was cut short by the 1980 Bolivian coup d'état.) | 1° | 1 August 1979 | 17 July 1980 | Pedro Maillard | MNR | [data missing] | 1 August 1979 | 17 July 1980 | 1979 | (Note: Elected on an electoral list of the MNR-A.) | |
| 1979–1980 | 2° | 1 August 1979 | 17 July 1980 | Miguel Trigo | MNR | [data missing] | 1 August 1979 | 17 July 1980 | 1979 | | |
| 1979–1980 | 1° | 1 August 1979 | 17 July 1980 | Edil Sandóval | MNRI | [data missing] | 1 August 1979 | 17 July 1980 | 1979 | (Note: Elected on an electoral list of the Democratic and Popular Union coalition.) | |
| 1982–1985 | 1° | 4 October 1982 | 6 August 1985 | Pedro Maillard | MNR | [data missing] | 4 October 1982 | 6 August 1985 | 1980 | | |
| 1982–1985 | 2° | 4 October 1982 | 6 August 1985 | Jorge Antelo | MNR | [data missing] | 4 October 1982 | 6 August 1985 | 1980 | | |
| 1982–1985 | 1° | 4 October 1982 | 6 August 1985 | Heberto Castedo | ADN | [data missing] | 4 October 1982 | 6 August 1985 | 1980 | | |
| 1985–1989 | 1° | 6 August 1985 | 6 August 1989 | Edil Sandóval | M-XX | [data missing] | 6 August 1985 | 6 August 1989 | 1985 | (Note: Elected on an electoral list of the MNR.) | |
| 1985–1989 | 2° | 6 August 1985 | 6 August 1989 | Carmelo Caballero | MNR | [data missing] | 6 August 1985 | 6 August 1989 | 1985 | | |
| 1985–1989 | 1° | 6 August 1985 | 6 August 1989 | Heberto Castedo | ADN | [data missing] | 6 August 1985 | 6 August 1989 | 1985 | | |
| 1989–1993 | 1° | 6 August 1989 | 6 August 1993 | Juan Carlos Durán | MNR | [data missing] | 6 August 1989 | 6 August 1993 | 1989 | | |
| 1989–1993 | 2° | 6 August 1989 | 6 August 1993 | Enrique Quintela | MNR | [data missing] | 6 August 1989 | 6 August 1993 | 1989 | | |
| 1989–1993 | 1° | 6 August 1989 | 6 August 1993 | Jorge Landívar | ADN | [data missing] | 6 August 1989 | 6 August 1993 | 1989 | | |
| 1993–1997 | 1° | 6 August 1993 | 6 August 1997 | Juan Carlos Durán | MNR | Julio Leigue | 6 August 1993 | 13 August 1993 | 1993 | (Note: Elected on an electoral list of the MNR-MRTKL coalition.) | (Note: Resigned to become prefect of Santa Cruz.) |
| 1993–1997 | 1° | 6 August 1993 | 6 August 1997 | Juan Carlos Durán | MNR | Vacant | 13 August 1993 | 6 August 1997 | 1993 | (Note: Elected on an electoral list of the MNR-MRTKL coalition.) | |
| 1993–1997 | 2° | 6 August 1993 | 6 August 1997 | Osvaldo Monasterio | MNR | Mario Barbery | 6 August 1993 | 6 August 1997 | 1993 | | |
| 1993–1997 | 1° | 6 August 1993 | 6 August 1997 | Jorge Landívar | ADN | Zvonko Matkovic Fleig | 6 August 1993 | 6 August 1997 | 1993 | (Note: Elected on an electoral list of the Patriotic Accord coalition.) | |
| 1997–2002 | 1° | 6 August 1997 | 21 June 1999 | Rubén Poma | UCS | Roberto Caballero | 6 August 1997 | 21 June 1999 | 1997 | (Note: Resigned to become minister of housing.) | |
| 1997–2002 | 1° | 21 June 1999 | 6 August 2001 | Roberto Caballero | UCS | Vacant | 21 June 1999 | 6 August 2001 | 1997 | | |
| 1997–2002 | 1° | 6 August 2001 | 2 August 2002 | Rubén Poma | UCS | Roberto Caballero | 6 August 2001 | 2 August 2002 | 1997 | | |
| 1997–2002 | 2° | 6 August 1997 | 2 August 2002 | Justo Yépez | UCS | Lourdes Pantoja | 6 August 1997 | 2 August 2002 | 1997 | | |
| 1997–2002 | 1° | 6 August 1997 | 2 August 2002 | Freddy Teodovich | MNR | Julio Leigue | 6 August 1997 | 2 August 2002 | 1997 | | |
| 2002–2006 | 1° | 2 August 2002 | 6 August 2002 | Guillermo Justiniano | MNR | Joaquín Monasterio | 2 August 2002 | 6 August 2002 | 2002 | (Note: Elected on an electoral list of the MNR-MBL coalition.) (Note: Resigned to become minister of sustainable development.) | |
| 2002–2006 | 1° | 6 August 2002 | 17 October 2003 | Joaquín Monasterio | MNR | Vacant | 6 August 2002 | 17 October 2003 | 2002 | | |
| 2002–2006 | 1° | 17 October 2003 | 22 January 2006 | Guillermo Justiniano | MNR | Joaquín Monasterio | 17 October 2003 | 22 January 2006 | 2002 | | |
| 2002–2006 | 2° | 2 August 2002 | 9 August 2002 | Mario Justiniano | MNR | Helen Hayes | 2 August 2002 | 9 August 2002 | 2002 | (Note: Resigned to become prefect of Santa Cruz.) | |
| 2002–2006 | 2° | 9 August 2002 | 22 January 2006 | Helen Hayes | MNR | Vacant | 9 August 2002 | 22 January 2006 | 2002 | | |
| 2002–2006 | 1° | 2 August 2002 | 22 January 2006 | Hormando Vaca Díez | MIR | Oswaldo Justiniano | 2 August 2002 | 22 January 2006 | 2002 | (Note: Elected on an electoral list of the MIR-FRI.) | |
| 2006–2009 | 1° | 22 January 2006 | 19 January 2010 | Óscar Ortiz Antelo | PDMS | María Silvia Baldomar | 22 January 2006 | 19 January 2010 | 2005 | | |
| 2006–2009 | 2° | 22 January 2006 | 19 January 2010 | Jorge Aguilera | PDMS | Bonifacio Barrientos | 22 January 2006 | 19 January 2010 | 2005 | | |
| 2006–2009 | 1° | 22 January 2006 | 19 January 2010 | Guido Guardia | MAS | Carlos Cuasace | 22 January 2006 | 19 January 2010 | 2005 | | |
| 2010–2014 | 1° | 19 January 2010 | 18 January 2015 | Germán Antelo | NPC | María Elva Pinckert | 19 January 2010 | 10 July 2014 | 2009 | (Note: Elected on an electoral list of the National Convergence coalition.) | (Note: Resigned to run for office.) |
| 2010–2014 | 1° | 19 January 2010 | 18 January 2015 | Germán Antelo | NPC | Vacant | 10 July 2014 | 25 July 2014 | 2009 | (Note: Elected on an electoral list of the National Convergence coalition.) | |
| 2010–2014 | 1° | 19 January 2010 | 18 January 2015 | Germán Antelo | NPC | Fátima Doly Velarde | 25 July 2014 | 18 January 2015 | 2009 | (Note: Elected on an electoral list of the National Convergence coalition.) | |
| 2010–2014 | 2° | 19 January 2010 | 18 January 2015 | Centa Rek | NPC | Victor Hugo Mayser | 19 January 2010 | 18 January 2015 | 2009 | | |
| 2010–2014 | 1° | 19 January 2010 | 14 July 2014 | Gabriela Montaño | MAS | Félix Martínez | 19 January 2010 | 28 July 2014 | 2009 | (Note: Resigned to run for office.) | |
| 2010–2014 | 1° | 14 July 2014 | 28 July 2014 | Vacant | MAS | Félix Martínez | 19 January 2010 | 28 July 2014 | 2009 | | |
| 2010–2014 | 1° | 28 July 2014 | 18 January 2015 | Félix Martínez | MAS | Vacant | 28 July 2014 | 18 January 2015 | 2009 | | |
| 2010–2014 | 2° | 19 January 2010 | 18 January 2015 | Isaac Ávalos | MAS | Amalia Sarabia | 19 January 2010 | 18 January 2015 | 2009 | | |
| 2014–2020 | 1° | 18 January 2015 | 26 May 2015 | Carlos Romero | MAS | Adriana Salvatierra | 23 January 2015 | 26 May 2015 | 2014 | (Note: Resigned to become minister of government.) | |
| 2014–2020 | 1° | 26 May 2015 | 3 November 2020 | Adriana Salvatierra | MAS | Vacant | 26 May 2015 | 1 September 2015 | 2014 | | |
| 2014–2020 | 1° | 26 May 2015 | 3 November 2020 | Adriana Salvatierra | MAS | Juan José Ric | 1 September 2015 | 3 November 2020 | 2014 | | |
| 2014–2020 | 2° | 18 January 2015 | 3 November 2020 | Felipa Merino | MAS | Anderson Cáceres | 23 January 2015 | 3 November 2020 | 2014 | | |
| 2014–2020 | 1° | 18 January 2015 | 8 May 2020 | Óscar Ortiz Antelo | MDS | María Lourdes Landívar | 23 January 2015 | 8 May 2020 | 2014 | (Note: Elected on an electoral list of the Democratic Unity coalition.) (Note: Resigned to become minister of productive development.) | |
| 2014–2020 | 1° | 8 May 2020 | 1 June 2020 | Vacant | MDS | María Lourdes Landívar | 23 January 2015 | 8 May 2020 | 2014 | | |
| 2014–2020 | 1° | 1 June 2020 | 3 November 2020 | María Lourdes Landívar | MDS | Vacant | 1 June 2020 | 3 November 2020 | 2014 | | |
| 2014–2020 | 2° | 18 January 2015 | 13 November 2019 | María Elva Pinckert | MDS | Carlos Pablo Klinsky | 23 January 2015 | 16 January 2020 | 2014 | (Note: Resigned to become minister of environment.) | |
| 2014–2020 | 2° | 13 November 2019 | 16 January 2020 | Vacant | MDS | Carlos Pablo Klinsky | 23 January 2015 | 16 January 2020 | 2014 | | |
| 2014–2020 | 2° | 16 January 2020 | 3 November 2020 | Carlos Pablo Klinsky | MDS | Vacant | 16 January 2020 | 3 November 2020 | 2014 | | |
| 2020–2025 | 1° | 3 November 2020 | Incumbent | Centa Rek | CRMS | Vacant | 9 November 2020 | 19 November 2020 | 2020 | | |
| 2020–2025 | 1° | 3 November 2020 | Incumbent | Centa Rek | CRMS | Zvonko Matkovic | 19 November 2020 | 21 January 2021 | 2020 | | (Note: Resigned to run for office.) |
| 2020–2025 | 1° | 3 November 2020 | Incumbent | Centa Rek | CRMS | Vacant | 21 January 2021 | 28 April 2021 | 2020 | | |
| 2020–2025 | 1° | 3 November 2020 | Incumbent | Centa Rek | CRMS | Erik Morón | 28 April 2021 | Incumbent | 2020 | | |
| 2020–2025 | 2° | 3 November 2020 | Incumbent | Henry Montero | CRMS | Paola Fernández (Note: Creemos-UCS.) | 9 November 2020 | Incumbent | 2020 | | |
| 2020–2025 | 1° | 3 November 2020 | Incumbent | Soledad Flores | MAS | William Torrez | 9 November 2020 | Incumbent | 2020 | | |
| 2020–2025 | 2° | 3 November 2020 | Incumbent | Isidoro Quispe | MAS | María Muñoz | 9 November 2020 | Incumbent | 2020 | | |
