= María Elva Pinckert =

Bolivian politician (born 1961)

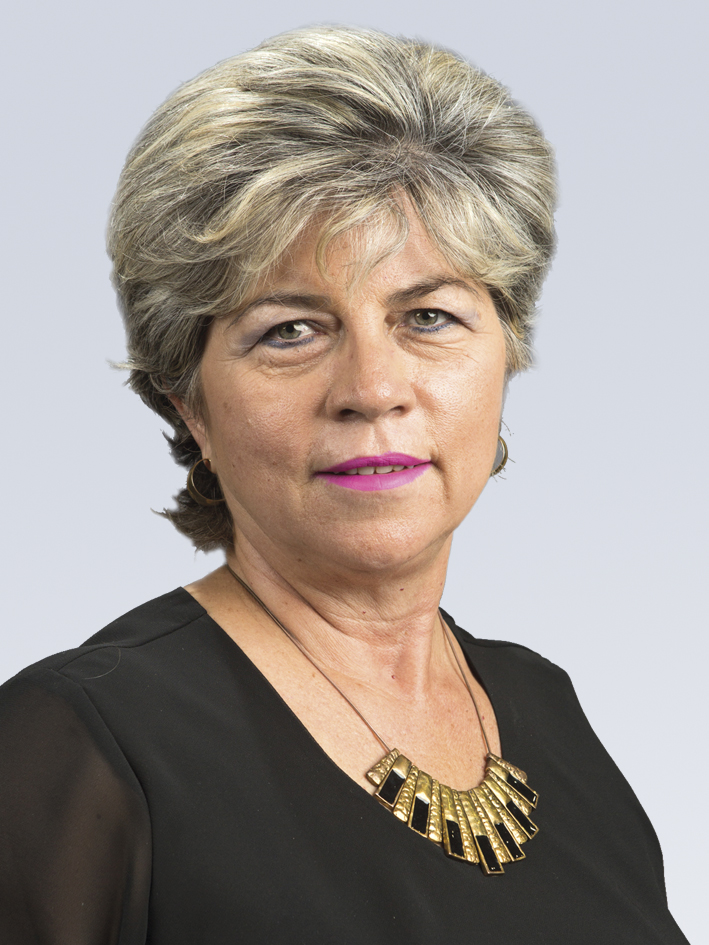
- Official portrait, 2018

Minister of Environment and Water
- In office 13 November 2019 – 6 November 2020
- President: Jeanine Áñez
- Preceded by: Carlos Ortuño
- Succeeded by: Juan Santos Cruz

Senator for Santa Cruz
- In office 18 January 2015 – 13 November 2019
- Substitute: Carlos Pablo Klinsky
- Preceded by: Isaac Ávalos
- Succeeded by: Carlos Pablo Klinsky

Substitute Senator for Santa Cruz
- In office 25 January 2010 – 10 July 2014
- Senator: Germán Antelo
- Preceded by: María Silvia Baldomar
- Succeeded by: Fátima Doly Velarde

Personal details
- Born: María Elva Pinckert Vaca; 15 January 1961 (age 65) Montero, Santa Cruz, Bolivia
- Party: Social Democratic Movement (2014–present)
- Other political affiliations: Revolutionary Nationalist Movement (before 2004); New Republican Force (2004–2010); New Civic Power (2010–2014)
- Education: Private Technological University of Santa Cruz (BSL)
- Occupation: Lawyer; politician

María Elva Pinckert Vaca (born 15 January 1961) is a Bolivian businesswoman, lawyer, and politician who served as minister of environment and water from 2019 to 2020. Pinckert developed her career in Santa Cruz's agro-industrial heartland, during which time she rose to key positions of regional economic and political influence, including presiding over the Montero Civic Committee and serving as vice president of the Santa Cruz Chamber of Industry and Commerce. Elected to the Montero Municipal Council as a member of the Revolutionary Nationalist Movement in 1999, Pinckert later switched to the New Republican Force, with which she won reelection. In 2009, the party promoted her to the Senate as a substitute senator under Germán Antelo. Amid the disunity brought about by the fragmentation of her parliamentary caucus, Pinckert aligned with the Social Democratic Movement, which nominated her for a full Senate seat. Elected in 2014, Pinckert held office until 2019, when she joined the Áñez administration as head of environmental and water policy. As with many former Áñez ministers, Pinckert faced judicial consequences for her collaboration with the transitional government, leading her to seek refuge in Brazil less than a year after leaving office.

== Early life and career ==
María Elva Pinckert was born on 15 January 1961 in Montero, Santa Cruz, to Eduardo Pinckert and Elva Vaca. She completed her primary education at the San Silvestre and Guabirá schools, later attending the María Auxiliadora School before graduating from the American Institute in Cochabamba. Coming out of high school, Pinckert studied law at the Private Technological University of Santa Cruz, graduating with a degree in legal sciences with specialization in municipal matters and autonomous processes.

Pinckert developed her career in the Integrated North, the primary agro-industrial region of Santa Cruz. She got her start in local civic associations, serving as president of the Montero Parents' Union from 1990 to 1996 and vice president of the city's women's Rotary Club, also in 1996. Between 1995 and 1996, Pinckert held office as vice president of the Santa Cruz Chamber of Industry and Commerce, later presiding over the Montero Civic Committee through the late 1990s, two posts of particular importance, demonstrating her rise to positions of regional economic and political influence.

== Political career ==
In 1999, Pinckert moved into local politics, motivated by the murder of her brother, who was unable to receive the necessary intensive care due to the lack of medical units in the region. In that year's municipal elections, she ran on the top of the Revolutionary Nationalist Movement (MNR)'s electoral list for a seat on the Montero Municipal Council. "One of my demands [to accept the nomination] was to build an intensive care unit in Montero; they offered me heaven and earth, that it was to be done ... from the municipal administration; it was not like that". Though elected as a substitute councillor, she held the primary seat as the original incumbent held the mayor's office. (Note: Per Article 3 Section VI of the 1967 Constitution with amendments from 1995, individuals who appear at the top of a party's electoral list of councillors are also that party's candidate for mayor.) Nearing the end of her term, Pinckert split with the MNR, joining the New Republican Force (NFR) and contesting the 2004 municipal elections as the party's mayoral candidate. She attained fifth place, owing to the NFR's minimal presence in the department, though still with a vote share high enough to maintain her seat in the municipal council. For the majority of her second term, Pinckert also served as the president of the Association of Municipalities of Santa Cruz.

Pinckert stepped into national politics upon the completion of her second municipal term, joining the National Convergence (CN) ticket, which ran the NFR's leader, Manfred Reyes Villa, for the presidency. She was elected as a substitute senator for Santa Cruz, serving under Germán Antelo. In early 2010, before even being sworn into the new legislature, Pinckert split with the NFR, joining New Civic Power (NPC), a regional civic group founded by Antelo that brought together a large contingent of CN's Santa Cruz delegation. The creation of NPC illustrated the centrifugal process within the CN caucus that ultimately led to its implosion and the dispersion of its elected parliamentarians to different fronts, owing to a lack of shared leadership and political vision between its members. The volatility of political acronyms experienced by the opposition meant that Pinckert's membership within NPC did not last long either. By the time of the 2014 general elections, she had moved to Rubén Costas' Social Democratic Movement (MDS), which nominated her for reelection, this time as a titular senator. During her term in the Senate, Pinckert focused her work on environmental issues, serving on the upper chamber's Environment, Biodiversity, Amazon, Protected Areas, and Climate Change Committee.

== Minister of Environment ==
Nearing the end of 2019, following that year's political crisis and the establishment of the transitional government of Jeanine Áñez, Pinckert was appointed by the new president to serve as minister of environment and water. Per Opinión's analysis of the Áñez Cabinet, Pinckert's designation would have come at the behest of Ernesto Suárez, former governor of Beni and Áñez's political boss. Pinckert's relationship with Áñez stemmed back nearly a decade, with both having served together in the Senate for two legislative terms.

One of the most pressing concerns for the Ministry of Environment during Pinckert's tenure was to address the aftermath of the Amazon rainforest wildfires that scorched the region between July and October, particularly affecting the tropical Chiquitania. Pinckert spoke of the issue in her address to that year's United Nations Climate Change Conference, blaming the previous government's "inadequate environmental policy" for causing Bolivia to have the highest deforestation rate per capita, more than double that of neighboring countries. In mid-December, Pinckert presented the Comprehensive Plan for the Restoration of the Chiquitania, which sought the participation of environmentalists and other experts in workshopping health, housing, productive development, and education policies related to the region. Continued environmental efforts resulted in the signing of an agreement with the Piraí River Water Channeling and Regularization Service (SEARPI) in August 2020 for the reforestation and repopulation of the Chiquitania. The agreement saw the Ministry of Environment and SEARPI invest a joint Bs 10 million to conduct work across at least 170,000 hectares.

== Flight from the country ==
As with the other ministers of the Áñez Cabinet, Pinckert resigned from office two days before the formal conclusion of the transitional government's mandate, retiring to her residence in Santa Cruz. Not long thereafter, the Prosecutor's Office opened two investigations into her, one for breach of duties and another for making illegal government appointments. In the first, Pinckert was accused of conducting official trips without valid justifications as to how they related to her ministerial duties. For this, she was cited to testify on 31 March 2021, though she did not attend, attesting that the recent death of her husband left her too depressed to present herself. In response, the Prosecutor's Office issued an arrest warrant against Pinckert, opening a migratory alert to prevent her from leaving the country.

The Pro Santa Cruz Civic Committee denounced the government's decision to seek Pinckert's arrest, labeling it an act of political persecution. For her part, Pinckert declared herself in hiding, assuring that she was "willing to stand before justice when justice is fair again". On her behalf, the Pro Santa Cruz Civic Committee issued a missive to the government of Brazil, requesting that it grant Pinckert political asylum until "an independent and impartial judicial system is achieved". Brazilian authorities accepted their request, granting Pinckert entry for a period of ninety days pending a formal review by the Brazilian National Refugee Commission on whether to grant her permanent political asylum.

== Electoral history ==
Electoral history of María Elva Pinckert
Year	Office	Party	Alliance	Votes			Result	Ref.
Year	Office	Party	Alliance	Total	%	P.	Result	Ref.
1999	Sub. Councillor	Revolutionary Nationalist Movement	None	7,279	37.34%	1st	Won	(Note: Presented on an electoral list. The data shown represents the share of the vote the entire party/alliance received in that constituency.)
2004	Mayor	New Republican Force	None	1,666	6.90%	5th	Partial	
2009	Sub. Senator	New Republican Force	National Convergence	567,974	52.60%	1st	Won	
2014	Senator	Social Democratic Movement	Democratic Unity	506,704	39.82%	2nd	Won	
Source: Plurinational Electoral Organ | Electoral Atlas

Civic offices
Preceded by Jorge Morales	President of the Association of Municipalities of Santa Cruz; 2006–2009	Succeeded by Katsumi Bany
Senate of Bolivia
Preceded by María Silvia Baldomar	Substitute Senator for Santa Cruz; 2010–2014; Served alongside: Víctor Hugo Mayser, Félix Martínez, Amalia Sarabia	Succeeded by Fátima Doly Velarde
Preceded by Isaac Ávalos	Senator for Santa Cruz; 2015–2019; Served alongside: Carlos Romero, Adriana Salvatierra, Felipa Merino, Oscar Ortiz	Succeeded by Carlos Pablo Klinsky
Political offices
Preceded by Carlos Ortuño	Minister of Environment and Water; 2019–2020	Succeeded by Juan Santos Cruz
