= Egüez =

Egüez or Eguez is a Spanish surname. Notable people with the surname include:

- Iván Egüez (born 1944), Ecuadorian writer
- Leonardo Eguez (born 1990), Bolivian football manager
- Eduardo Egüez (born 1959), Argentine lutenist, theorbist, and guitarist
- Orlando Egüez (1974–2019), Bolivian lawyer and politician
- Rafael Dávila Egüez (born 1960), Ecuadorian politician and engineer
