= Centa Rek =

Bolivian politician (born 1954)

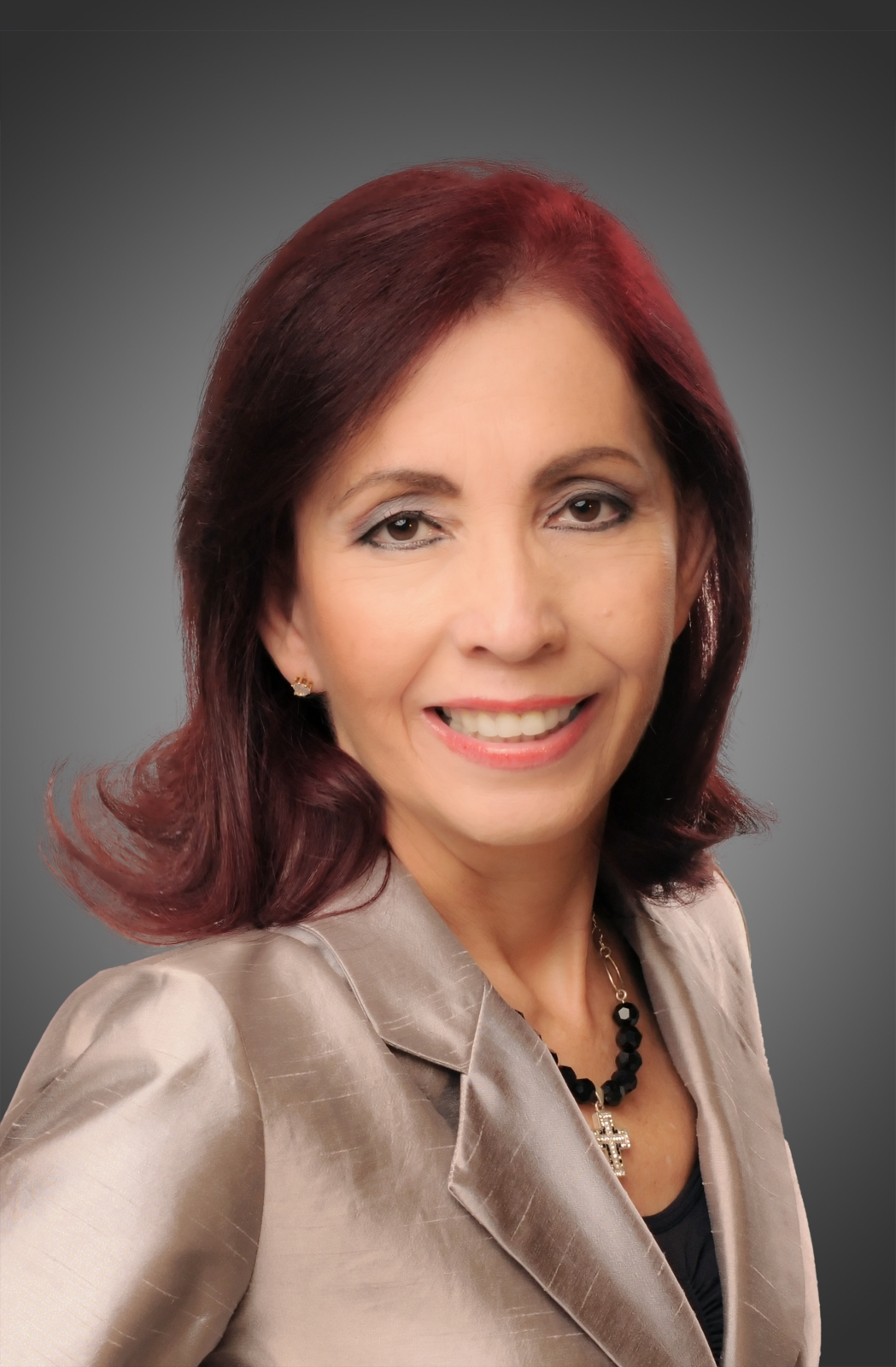
- Official portrait, 2020

Senator for Santa Cruz
- Incumbent
- Assumed office 3 November 2020
- Substitute: Zvonko Matković (2020–2021); Erik Morón (2021–present)
- Preceded by: Adriana Salvatierra
- In office 19 January 2010 – 18 January 2015
- Substitute: Víctor Hugo Mayser
- Preceded by: Jorge Aguilera
- Succeeded by: Felipa Merino

Personal details
- Born: Centa Lothy Rek López; 27 August 1954 (age 72) San José de Chiquitos, Santa Cruz, Bolivia
- Party: Creemos (2020–present)
- Other political affiliations: New Civic Power (2010–2015)
- Spouse: José Luis Durán (m. 1975, divorced)
- Education: Catholic University of Córdoba
- Occupation: Novelist; politician; psychoanalyst

Centa Lothy Rek López (born 27 August 1954) is a Bolivian novelist, politician, and psychoanalyst who served as senator for Santa Cruz from 2010 to 2015 and since 2020.

Raised in San José de Chiquitos and educated in psychology at institutes in Brazil and Argentina, Rek spent her early career practicing clinical psychoanalysis at schools and educational organizations in the Santa Cruz Department. In 1995, she published her first novel and quickly shifted towards a career as a professional writer, in addition to dabbling in journalism and television presentation.

Initially supportive of the left-wing policies of President Evo Morales, Rek split with the government over disagreements regarding political autonomy for Bolivia's eastern departments. In 2009, she was elected to represent Santa Cruz in the Senate as part of the opposition National Convergence alliance. Together with her colleague, Germán Antelo, Rek sought to build the foundations of a new political party, but opposition infighting caused the project to flounder. After 2015, Rek largely retired from political life but made a comeback in 2020 with her election to a second term as part of Creemos, a new regionalist party.

== Early life and career ==
=== Early life and education ===
Centa Rek was born on 27 August 1954 in San José de Chiquitos, a small town situated in eastern Santa Cruz's tropical Chiquitania region. On her father's side, Rek is of ethnic German descent; the family's presence in the region dates back to her grandparents, who first settled the Chiquitania with their children, where they developed extensive careers in agriculture and cattle ranching. Rek's family remains a prominent staple of the department's agribusiness sector; her brothers, Erwin and Elmar, helmed the Federation of Ranchers of Santa Cruz, and the former also administered Fexpocruz—the department's premier exposition fair—in 1996.

Rek was raised in her birth town of San José de Chiquitos alongside five siblings as well as a few rural girls her parents hosted. At age 14, she was sent to study at the Santa Ana School, a boarding school in Sucre. She completed her final year of secondary in Santa Cruz de la Sierra before traveling to the United States as part of a cultural exchange program. Upon her return, Rek moved to Rio de Janeiro to study psychology. She later transferred to the University of Córdoba, where she graduated as a clinical psychoanalyst.

=== Psychology and writing career ===
Following her return from Argentina, Rek settled in Santa Cruz de la Sierra, where she developed a career in school psychology; she collaborated with the educational organization Fe y Alegría, directed the Bella Vista Interamerican School, and participated in the foundation of the Santa Cruz College of Psychologists.

Influenced by her work in education and motivated by the passing of her father, Rek began writing around the late 1980s and early 1990s. Her first novel, Los Mundos, was published in 1995 and contains a semi-autobiographical telling of Rek's intercultural experiences in youth. Since then, Rek has published a total of six novels, the most recent being Abril (2019), as well as a number of short story anthologies.

As her public presence grew, Rek shifted away from psychology and towards a career in journalism. She wrote as a columnist for various press outlets, directed and edited the children's magazine Alfeñique, and spent six years co-hosting the political analysis show Rayos X. Between 2005 and 2009, she directed the Santa Cruz-based publication La Estrella del Oriente.

== Chamber of Senators ==
=== First term ===
==== Election ====
Rek's early ideological leanings skewed towards the political left. Her extensive criticism of the capitalist and neoliberal economic model promoted by figures such as Gonzalo Sánchez de Lozada initially led her to sympathize with the nascent Movement for Socialism. When the party's leader, Evo Morales, was elected president, Rek collaborated with his government; she served as Morales's presidential delegate to Santa Cruz and was a member of REPAC, the president's team of representatives to the Constituent Assembly.

However, by the late 2000s, Rek's strong positions in favor of the autonomist movement in Santa Cruz led her to assume a critical stance toward Morales and his government. In 2009, despite her lack of party affiliation, Rek accepted an invitation on the part of the opposition National Convergence (PPB-CN) alliance to contest a seat in the Chamber of Senators in representation of Santa Cruz. She won the race.

==== Tenure ====
As a parliamentary group, the CN caucus quickly imploded, a product of the flight from the country of its main leader, Manfred Reyes Villa, and the inability—and unwillingness—of the alliance's component parties to form an organizational committee. "After the election, ... there was no possibility of giving [CN] continuity," Rek recalled, "there was no vision to make it perpetuate." Seeing this, Rek was one of the first members to go. Before even being sworn in, she joined New Civic Power (NPC), a newly-founded party led by her senatorial colleague, Germán Antelo, that quickly absorbed a majority of CN's parliamentary delegation in Santa Cruz.

Even as the formation of NPC agitated friction between members of CN, Rek sought to maintain a modicum of unity among the alliance's senators. "We no longer encouraged any expectations [of continuity], but we did know that Convergence had to function throughout the legislature, with the greatest possibility of cohesion," she stated. In that sense, she continued to operate within the alliance's Senate caucus; she served as deputy leader of CN from 2011 to 2012, was the group's acting leader from late 2012 to early 2013, and was elected to lead what remained of the bloc in the 2010–2015 legislature's closing year.

Given her experience operating within the fractured CN alliance, Rek sought to structure a more coherent opposition bloc in preparation for the 2014 election. In late 2013, she and Antelo signed on to the Broad Front, a big tent grouping of opposition parties led by businessman Samuel Doria Medina. However, that alliance quickly crumbled after Doria Medina entered a pact with Santa Cruz Governor Rubén Costas, whose personal rivalries with Antelo provoked the latter into pulling out of the arrangement. Although Rek and Antelo considered remaining in the race on their own, they ultimately opted to endorse former president Jorge Quiroga's campaign. Amid shifting alliances and the collapse of the Broad Front, Rek was not nominated for reelection.

==== Commission assignments ====
- Chamber of Senators Directorate (Second Vice President: 2012–2013)
- Territorial Organization of the State and Autonomies Commission
  - Departmental Autonomies Committee (Secretary: 2011–2012)
- International Policy Commission (President: 2013–2014)
- Land and Territory, Natural Resources, and Environment Commission
  - Environment, Biodiversity, Amazon, Protected Areas, and Climate Change Committee (Secretary: 2010–2011, 2014–2015)

=== Second term ===
==== Election ====
Following the conclusion of her senatorial term, Rek largely retired from political life. During this time, she returned to her roots in psychology, working for a volunteer group that helped provide psychological assistance to young men involved in gangs and women who have suffered domestic violence. Asked in 2019 about whether she would become involved again in politics, Rek stated: "It was a very enriching experience, but it's over now."

Rek's tune changed in the wake of that year's political crisis. "We were entering an authoritarian government that did not respect the popular vote," she stated. Through her work in journalism, Rek came into contact with civic leader Luis Fernando Camacho, who invited her to once again contest a Senate seat on behalf of his Creemos party, a proposal she accepted. Elected to a second term at age 66, Rek was the eldest of Santa Cruz's four elected senators.

==== Tenure ====
Rek has characterized "obsolete centralism" as one of the "chronic ills of the state." In addition to expanding the powers of the country's departmental autonomies, she has also followed the line of others in her party in pushing for the institution of a federalist model, which she argued could boost regional development. In that vein, after spending a term on the Senate's directorate, Rek spent the ensuing years of her tenure operating within committees and commissions dealing with the country's territorial organization. During this time, she also played a prominent role within Creemos's Senate caucus, including serving as its leader between 2021 and 2022.

==== Commission assignments ====
- Chamber of Senators Directorate (Second Secretary: 2020–2021)
- Territorial Organization of the State and Autonomies Commission (President: 2022–present)
- Land and Territory, Natural Resources, and Environment Commission
  - Land and Territory, Natural Resources, and Coca Leaf Committee (Secretary: 2021–2022)

== Personal life ==
While in Argentina, aged 21, Rek married José Luis Durán, a member of a politically influential family from Santa Cruz with close ties to the Revolutionary Nationalist Movement—his brother, Juan Carlos Durán, was the party's presidential candidate in 1997. The couple settled in Santa Cruz de la Sierra, where Durán served on the municipal council. However, Rek's decision to pursue a career of her own strained relations with her husband and the pair soon divorced. Recounting the circumstances of their separation, Rek recalled: "My ex-husband did not want me to work. He thought it was very good that I was educated but only ... [so that I could] be a good mother ... I got divorced because of the machista treatment I received from my partner."

Rek later remarried and has one daughter with her new spouse, in addition to the two sons from her previous relationship. One of her sons, Alejandro Durán Rek, served on the board of directors of the Santa Cruz Rural Electrification Cooperative (CRE) and was president of the CRE Foundation, the operational arm of the organization's many social responsibility programs.

== Electoral history ==
Electoral history of Centa Rek
Year	Office	Alliance	Votes			Result	Ref.
Year	Office	Alliance	Total	%	P.	Result	Ref.
2009	Senator	National Convergence	567,974	52.60%	1st	Won	(Note: Presented on an electoral list. The data shown represents the share of the vote the entire party/alliance received in that constituency.)
2020	Senator	Creemos	717,742	45.07%	1st	Won	
Source: Plurinational Electoral Organ | Electoral Atlas

== Publications ==
- Rek López, Centa (1995). Los mundos (in Spanish). Santa Cruz de la Sierra: Editorial Landívar. OCLC 36238521.
- ———————— (1999). Por otra ventana (in Spanish). Santa Cruz de la Sierra: Sutó, Fondo Editorial del Proyecto Sur. OCLC 44651045.
- ———————— (2003). Paraíso de cartón (in Spanish). Santa Cruz de la Sierra: Editorial Oriente S.A. ISBN 99905-0-278-1. OCLC 1245645606.
- ———————— (2006). Zona rosa (in Spanish). La Paz: Editorial Gente Común. OCLC 255155597.
- ———————— (2009). Las lluvias (in Spanish). La Paz: Editorial Gente Común. ISBN 978-99954-751-8-5. OCLC 837098611.
- ———————— (2019). Abril (in Spanish). La Paz: Editorial 3600. ISBN 978-99974-382-9-4. OCLC 1127649510.

Senate of Bolivia
Preceded by Jorge Aguilera	Senator for Santa Cruz; 2010–2015; Served alongside: Germán Antelo, Gabriela Montaño, Isaac Ávalos	Succeeded by Felipa Merino
Preceded by Gerald Ortiz	Second Vice President of the Senate; 2012–2013	Succeeded by Bernard Gutiérrez
Preceded by Adriana Salvatierra	Senator for Santa Cruz; 2020–present Served alongside: Henry Montero, Soledad Flores, Isidoro Quispe	Incumbent
Preceded by Rosario Rodríguez	Second Secretary of the Senate; 2020–2021	Succeeded by Julio Romaña
Party political offices
Preceded by Roger Pinto	Acting Leader of the Senate; National Convergence Caucus; 2012–2013	Succeeded by Marcelo Antezana
Preceded by Marcelo Antezana	Leader of the Senate; National Convergence Caucus; 2014–2015	Caucus dissolved
Preceded by Henry Montero	Leader of the Senate; Creemos Caucus; 2021–2022	Succeeded by Henry Montero
