= Orlando Egüez =

Bolivian politician (1974–2019)

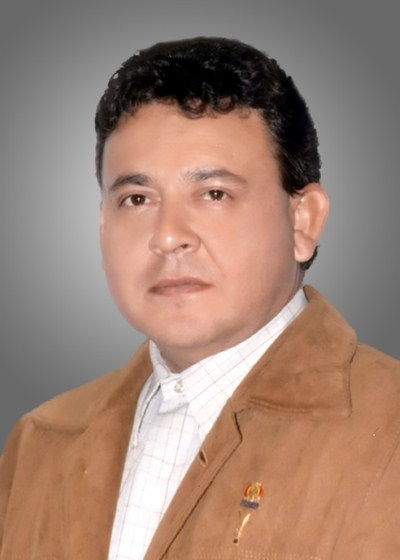
- Official portrait, 2017

Member of the Chamber of Deputies from Beni circumscription 60
- In office 18 January 2015 – 8 June 2019
- Substitute: Verónica Téllez
- Preceded by: Einar Gozálves (Note: Redistribution; circumscription 64.)
- Succeeded by: Verónica Téllez
- Constituency: Ballivián; Vaca Díez

Personal details
- Born: Orlando Egüez Algarañaz; 4 March 1974 Riberalta, Beni, Bolivia
- Died: 8 June 2019 (aged 45) La Paz, Bolivia
- Cause of death: Terminal cancer
- Party: Revolutionary Nationalist Movement
- Relatives: Carmelo Lens (brother-in-law)
- Education: Technical University of Beni
- Occupation: Lawyer; politician

Orlando Egüez Algarañaz (4 March 1974 – 8 June 2019) was a Bolivian lawyer and politician who served as a member of the Chamber of Deputies from Beni, representing circumscription 60 from 2015 until his death in 2019. A member of the Revolutionary Nationalist Movement, Egüez practiced law in Riberalta before making the jump into politics. Elected to the Chamber of Deputies in representation of the Democratic Unity coalition, he joined other members of his party in breaking away from that caucus once in office. Although the move garnered Egüez some high-up committee positions, a 2016 cancer diagnosis impeded his ability to legislate, and he died in office three years later.

== Early life and career ==
Orlando Egüez was born on 4 March 1974 in Riberalta, Beni, to a well-to-do family of some modest means. He completed his secondary education in the city, attending the Nuestra Señora del Carmen School, from which he graduated in 1991. He later pursued university studies at the Technical University of Beni, where he graduated as a lawyer with a master's in criminal law. Returning to Riberalta, Egüez established his own private practice and, according to his colleagues, would occasionally provide his services to less well-off clients without seeking financial compensation.

== Chamber of Deputies ==
=== Election ===
A member of the Revolutionary Nationalist Movement (MNR), Egüez entered the political scene in 2014 when he was nominated to contest a seat in the Chamber of Deputies on behalf of Democratic Unity (UD), a broad opposition coalition made up of the National Unity Front, Social Democratic Movement, and local factions of the MNR led by Erik Morón.

For UD, Egüez's rather rapid incursion onto the national stage represented a break in strategy—the alliance, for the most part, had hedged its bets on nominating well-known figures and experienced politicians to maximize parliamentary representation. Far and away from that, Egüez's candidacy responded to personal interests; he had been invited to run by Beni's governor, Carmelo Lens, his brother-in-law. Lens would go on to accompany Egüez as his campaign manager, overseeing a successful race in which Egüez was elected to represent Beni's circumscription 60.

=== Tenure ===
Shortly after taking office, Egüez joined other elected members of his party in breaking off from UD, establishing the MNR as its own caucus within the Chamber of Deputies. With the votes of the ruling Movement for Socialism (MAS-IPSP), the MNR was granted control over several powerful committees, with Egüez being selected to chair the Territorial Organization of the State Commission. This de facto alliance—which both parties denied existed—translated into the departmental caucuses, where the votes of Egüez and his substitute tipped the scales in favor of MAS Senator Erwin Rivero, who was elected president of Beni's parliamentary delegation.

Two years into his term, in 2016, Egüez was diagnosed with cancer, a disease he spent the duration of his term combating. During this time, he became active in promoting the expansion of medical access into less developed areas of the country. "Unfortunately, [the situation] is deplorable ... there is no oncology, there is no trained personnel, and ... in Beni, there is no [medical] service; we have to go to the capitals: Cochabamba, Santa Cruz, and Sucre," he commented. By mid-2019, Egüez's condition had become terminal; he died from the disease in June of that year. His passing was commemorated with a minute of silence in the Chamber of Deputies, and he was laid to rest at a general cemetery in Beni the following day. Egüez's substitute, Verónica Téllez, was sworn in to fill his vacant seat on 17 July.

=== Commission assignments ===
- Planning, Economic Policy, and Finance Commission
  - Financial, Monetary, and Insurance Policy Committee (Secretary: 2017–2018)
- Territorial Organization of the State and Autonomies Commission (President: 2015–2016)
- Government, Defense, and Armed Forces Commission
  - Fight Against Drug Trafficking Committee (2019)
  - Public Security Committee (2016–2017)
- International Relations and Migrant Protection Commission
  - International Relations, Migrant Protection, and International Organizations Committee (2018–2019)

== Electoral history ==
Electoral history of Orlando Egüez
Year	Office	Party	Alliance	Votes			Result	Ref.
Year	Office	Party	Alliance	Total	%	P.	Result	Ref.
2014	Deputy	Revolutionary Nationalist Movement	Democratic Unity	22,910	58.61%	1st	Won	
Source: Plurinational Electoral Organ | Electoral Atlas

Chamber of Deputies of Bolivia
Preceded by Einar Gozálves	Member of the Chamber of Deputies from Beni circumscription 60; 2015–2019	Succeeded by Verónica Téllez
