= Erik Morón =

Bolivian politician

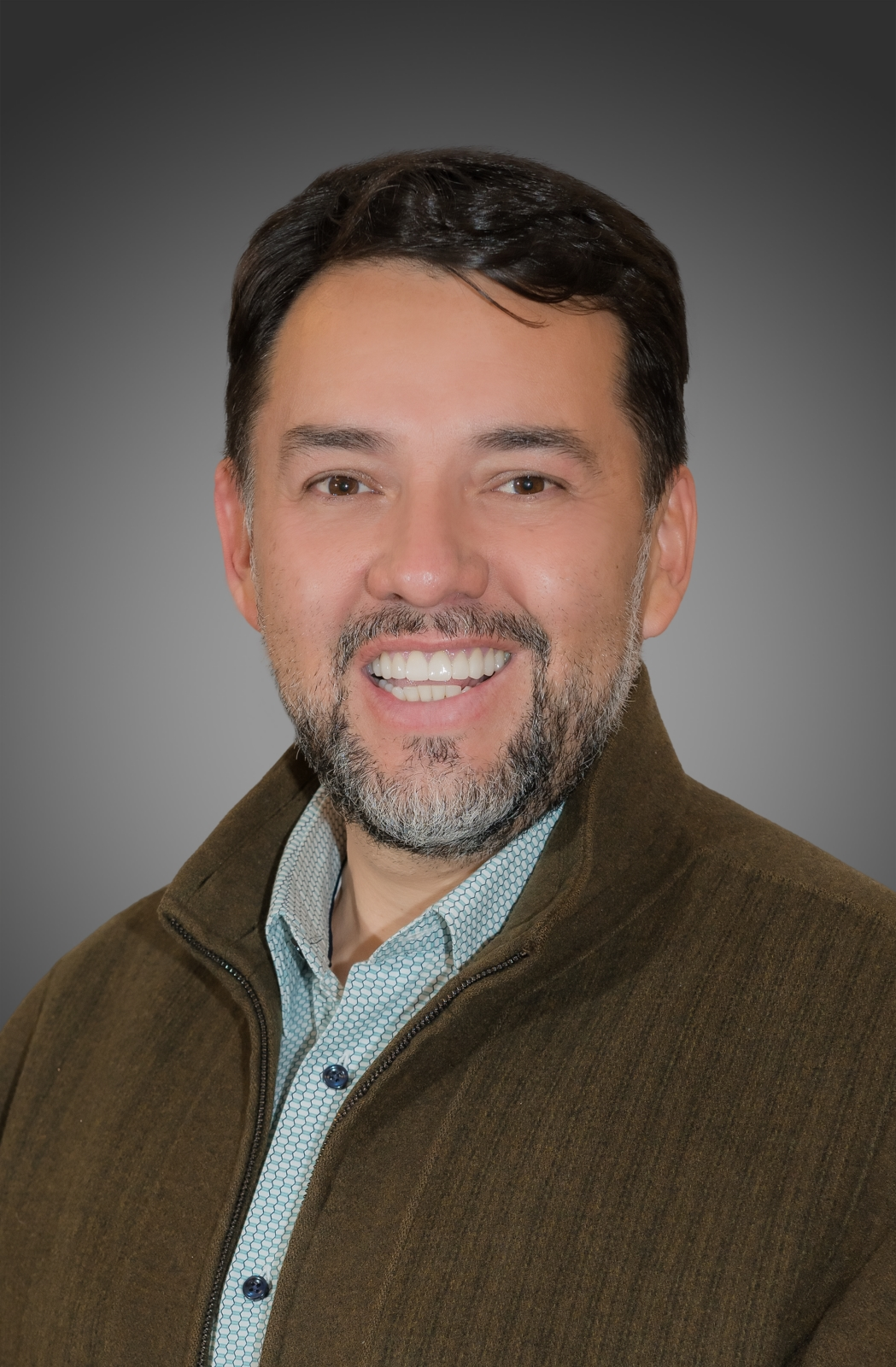

Substitute Senator for Santa Cruz
- Incumbent
- Assumed office 28 April 2021 Serving with Paola Fernández, William Torrez, and María Muñoz
- Senator: Centa Rek
- Preceded by: Zvonko Matkovic

Member of the Chamber of Deputies from Santa Cruz
- In office 18 January 2015 – 3 November 2020
- Substitute: Maida Dominguez Zabala
- Constituency: Plurinominal

Personal details
- Born: Erik Morón Osinaga; 25 May 1975 (age 51) Santa Cruz de la Sierra, Bolivia
- Party: Creemos (2020–present)
- Other political affiliations: Revolutionary Nationalist Movement (before 2018); Democratic Unity (2014–2015); Independent (2018–2020)
- Spouse: Zarella Poma
- Children: 3
- Relatives: Marioly Morón (sister)
- Education: Florida Atlantic University (BA); Florida International University College of Business (MBA)

Erik Morón Osinaga (born 25 May 1975) is a Bolivian economist and politician serving as substitute senator for Santa Cruz. A former member of the Revolutionary Nationalist Movement —of which he was national leader from 2011 to 2016— he previously served as a plurinominal member of the Chamber of Deputies from Santa Cruz from 2015 to 2020 on behalf of the Democratic Unity coalition.

== Early life and career ==
Erik Morón was born on 25 May 1975 in Santa Cruz de la Sierra. He belongs to one of the branches of the Sandoval Morón family, a clan that was influential in the historical structure of the Revolutionary Nationalist Movement (MNR). He studied abroad in the United States where he graduated with a degree in economics from Florida Atlantic University before later receiving a master's degree in international business at Florida International University. Upon completing his education, he returned to settle in Bolivia where he dedicated himself to cattle ranching.

== Leader of the MNR ==
=== Assumption and election ===
Morón's entry into politics coincided with the decline of the MNR in the wake of the abortive second term of the party's national leader, Gonzalo Sánchez de Lozada. He served as the MNR's departmental leader in Santa Cruz, a region that, in the midst of the MNR's internal crisis, maintained a level of support for the party. By 2010, Morón had risen to become the MNR's first national deputy leader. While in this position, on 1 February 2011, he was appointed as the national leader of the MNR following the death of his predecessor, Franklin "Panka" Anaya.

In 2013, Morón sought to be elected to his own mandate as party leader. The selection process was fraught with controversy, with MNRistas from different departments coming to blows. Disputes ultimately culminated in the withdrawal of the delegates from Tarija, Oruro, and El Alto, resulting in just 105 of the 180 delegates from the nine departments participating in the election. After two hours of deliberations, Morón emerged as the winner with ninety-two votes in his favor. The quarrel over the leadership election fostered a deep internal rupture within the MNR, with opponents of Morón disregarding him and proclaiming Johnny Torres as their leader. The two separately, mutually claimed to be the legitimate heads of the party, even after the Plurinational Electoral Organ certified Torres as the government's officially recognized leader on 18 March 2014.

=== Removal and expulsion ===
On 15 August 2016, the Supreme Electoral Tribunal (TSE) detected that, while the Court had since disregarded Torres and certified Morón as leader of the MNR, he was not registered as a member of that party but rather as a member of the Christian Democratic Party (PDC). According to uncovered records, Morón would have been appearing on PDC membership lists since 2002. Morón's spokesman assured that the signature appearing on the PDC's roster was fraudulent, an argument accepted by the TSE, which gave him ninety days to rectify the discrepancy. However, Morón failed to meet this deadline and his certification as leader of the MNR was consequently revoked by the TSE on 3 November. His elected successor, Luis Eduardo Siles, subsequently denounced him for committing acts of political transfuge and failing to fulfill party functions. On 31 October 2018, the TSE accepted the MNR's request to expel Morón from the party and remove him from its register of members.

== Chamber of Deputies ==
=== Elections ===
==== 2005 ====
Morón's first electoral campaign was in 2005, when he sought a seat in the Chamber of Deputies. The MNR presented him as a uninominal candidate in circumscription 51 (Santa Cruz de la Sierra). He ultimately came in fourth place, coming just shy of reaching ten percent of the vote.

==== 2014 ====
The MNR entered the 2014 elections in the midst of an internal crisis and facing the possibility of losing its legal status if it did not achieve three percent of the vote. Though both Morón and Torres initially agreed to seal an alliance with the National Unity Front (UN), the decision of its leader, Samuel Doria Medina, to form the Democratic Unity (UD) coalition with the Social Democratic Movement without first consulting the MNR led the two competing leaders to once again split. While Torres' faction rejected UD and endorsed the Christian Democratic Party, Morón's faction maintained its support for Doria Medina.

=== Tenure ===
The split in the MNR ultimately resulted in the party's failure to present itself in the 2014 elections. Nonetheless, its members penetrated the electoral lists of both the PDC and UD, including Morón, who was elected as a deputy under the UD acronym. Shortly after taking office, Morón announced that the MNR's five elected deputies from UD and two elected deputies from the PDC had decided to split from their respective groups and form a singular caucus. He stated that he and his colleagues "will not obey [other leaders], we have a party line, that of the MNR". In this way, the Revolutionary Nationalist Movement managed to once again attain national representation through entryism in other groups. The new caucus based itself in the Casa Rosada, the party's La Paz headquarters, because, having not been elected on its own list, it did not receive an office in the Legislative Assembly. The emergence of the MNR as a separate parliamentary bloc further fractured the already weak opposition. The party presented its own list of candidates for legislative commissions and, with the support of the ruling Movement for Socialism (MAS-IPSP), was elected to positions on four bodies, including the third secretariat of the Chamber of Deputies, which was granted to Morón. As a result, the opposition accused the MNR of forming an alliance with the MAS in order to attain higher positions in the legislature.

== Chamber of Senators ==
=== Election ===
For the 2020 general election, the newly formed Creemos alliance postulated Morón as its candidate for third substitute senator for Santa Cruz alongside Gaby Peña. Though Creemos won the Santa Cruz Department, it only obtained a forty-five percent plurality of the vote, allowing it to win just two senators, thus leaving Peña and Morón unelected.

==== Appointment ====
On 21 January 2021, Zvonko Matkovic, first substitute senator for Santa Cruz alongside Centa Rek, submitted his resignation is order to present himself as a candidate for departmental assemblyman in the upcoming regional elections. As a result, José Antonio Chávez, Creemos' delegate before the Supreme Electoral Tribunal, requested that the TSE authorize and accredit Morón to fill the vacancy. Creemos considered that Morón, as the third on its list of candidates for substitute senator, was next in line to occupy the post. However, this was quickly challenged by Morón's former running mate, Peña, who asserted that, as she was a candidate for titular senator rather than substitute, she took priority over him. Though Peña filed an appeal with the TSE, it was noted that Morón already began exercising legislative functions prior to its ruling, as evidenced by attendance sheets from the Santa Cruz Parliamentary Brigade, which indicated his presence as early as its fourth session held on 19 February. The TSE ultimately ruled in favor of Morón on 26 March, though the resolution was not made public until almost a month later. Morón was officially sworn in on 28 April 2021.

=== Tenure ===
Shortly after officially assuming office, Morón issued a letter to President of the Senate Andrónico Rodríguez requesting the convocation of a meeting between the minister of justice and the nine departmental governors with the aim of modifying Law N° 348 in order to combat rising cases of femicide in the country. On 28 September 2021, Morón introduced a bill that would impose harsher punishments on those found guilty of violent crimes such as murder or rape. It stipulated life imprisonment in cases of parricide, mariticide/uxoricide, or when the victim is a descendant or domestic partner of the accused. Additionally, it proposed chemical castration in cases of rape of minors under fourteen years of age.

== Electoral history ==
Year	Office	Party	Alliance	Votes			Result	Ref
Year	Office	Party	Alliance	Total	%	P.	Result	Ref
2005	Deputy	Revolutionary Nationalist Movement	None	4,177	9.16%	4th	Lost	
2011	Leader	Revolutionary Nationalist Movement	None	92	87.62% (Note: Of the 105 delegates present and voting. Seventy-five delegates abstained.)	1st	Won	
2014	Deputy	Revolutionary Nationalist Movement	Democratic Unity	506,704	39.82%	2nd (Note: Presented on an electoral list. The data shown represents the share of the vote the entire party/alliance received in that constituency.)	Won	
2020	Alt. Senator	Independent	Creemos	717,742	45.07%	1st	Lost	
Source: Plurinational Electoral Organ | Electoral Atlas

Party political offices
Preceded by Franklin Anaya	National Leader of the Revolutionary Nationalist Movement; 2011–2016	Succeeded by Luis Eduardo Siles
Senate of Bolivia
Preceded by Zvonko Matkovic	Alternate Senator for Santa Cruz; 2021–present Served alongside: Paola Fernández, William Torrez, María Muñoz	Incumbent
