= Felipe Quispe =

Bolivian historian, politician, and trade unionist (1942–2021)

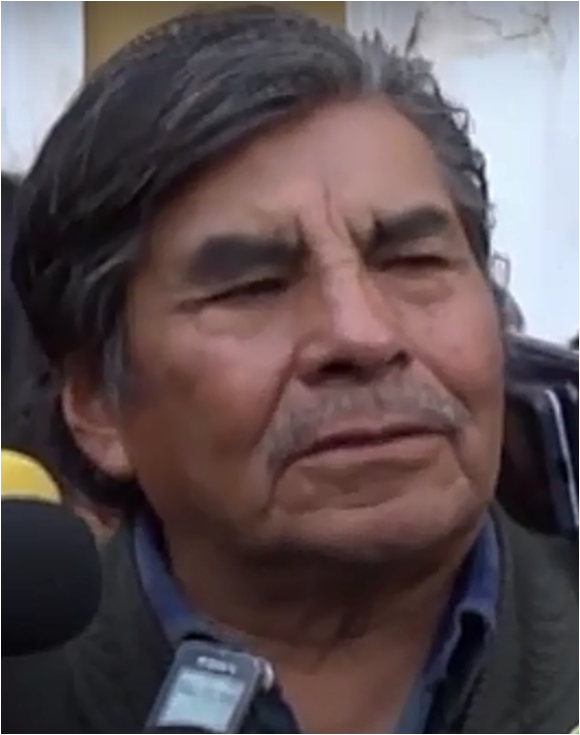

Member of the Chamber of Deputies from La Paz
- In office 6 August 2002 – 1 June 2004

Personal details
- Born: Felipe Quispe Huanca; 22 August 1942 Achacachi, La Paz, Bolivia
- Died: 19 January 2021 (aged 78) El Alto, La Paz, Bolivia
- Party: Jallalla La Paz (2021); Pachakuti Indigenous Movement (2002–2005)
- Education: Higher University of San Andrés

Felipe Quispe Huanca "Mallku" (Quechua language: "condor"), (22 August 1942 – 19 January 2021) was a Bolivian historian and political leader. He headed the Pachakuti Indigenous Movement (MIP) and was general secretary of the United Union Confederation of Working Peasants of Bolivia (CSUTCB).

== Biography ==
Quispe founded the Tupak Katari Indian Movement in 1979 and the Tupak Katari Guerrilla Army in 1990. His honorific name, Mallku, refers to the spirit of the mountains that surround and protect the People, and therefore is the source of life. "Mallku" means "peak" both in geography and in hierarchy.

In 1984, he was one of the leading organisers of the Tupac Katari Guerrilla Army, a failed armed insurrection against the government. Quispe was arrested for his involvement in the movement on August 19, 1992. Quispe has worked for the establishment of a Tawantinsuyu republic — which would take the name "Collasuyu" — in the Aymara-majority regions of Bolivia.

Quispe was a staunch opponent of the neoliberal Washington consensus, and was also strongly against U.S.-led schemes toward coca eradication, which he sees as destroying a critical part of Aymara culture. He was involved heavily in the Bolivian Gas War.

Quispe ran failed campaigns in the 2002 and 2005 presidential elections, which saw the victory of indigenous Evo Morales, leader of MAS (Movimiento al socialismo). Quispe was a vocal critic of Morales' government, characterising it as representing "neoliberalism with an Indian face".

Quispe died on 19 January 2021 in El Alto from cardiac arrest.

== Bibliography ==
Farthing, Linda C.; Kohl, Benjamin H. (2014). Evo's Bolivia: Continuity and Change. Austin: University of Texas Press. ISBN 978-0292758681.

Party political offices
Preceded by Political party established	Pachakuti Indigenous Movement nominee for President of Bolivia; 2002, 2005	Succeeded by Party dissolved
Preceded by Political party established	Jallalla La Paz nominee for Governor of La Paz; Died; 2021	Succeeded by Santos Quispe
