= Policarpio Castañeta Yujra =

Bolivian politician (born 1957)

Policarpio Castañeta Yujra (born December 7, 1957) is a Bolivian politician. Castañeta Yujra won the C-16 single-member constituency seat (in El Alto) in the 2002 parliamentary election as the candidate of the Indigenous Pachakuti Movement. His alternate in parliament was Rosa Huayhua Mamani de Condori.

In 2008 Castañeta Yujra, along with Rodolfo Flores Quisbert, Esteban Castro Chipana and Alejando Quispe Choque, applied for registration of a new political party, the New Plurinational West-East Alliance (Nueva Alianza Plurinacional Occidente y Oriente, N-APOYO). As of 2009, the registration was not completed.
