= Adriana Salvatierra =

Bolivian political scientist and politician (born 1989)

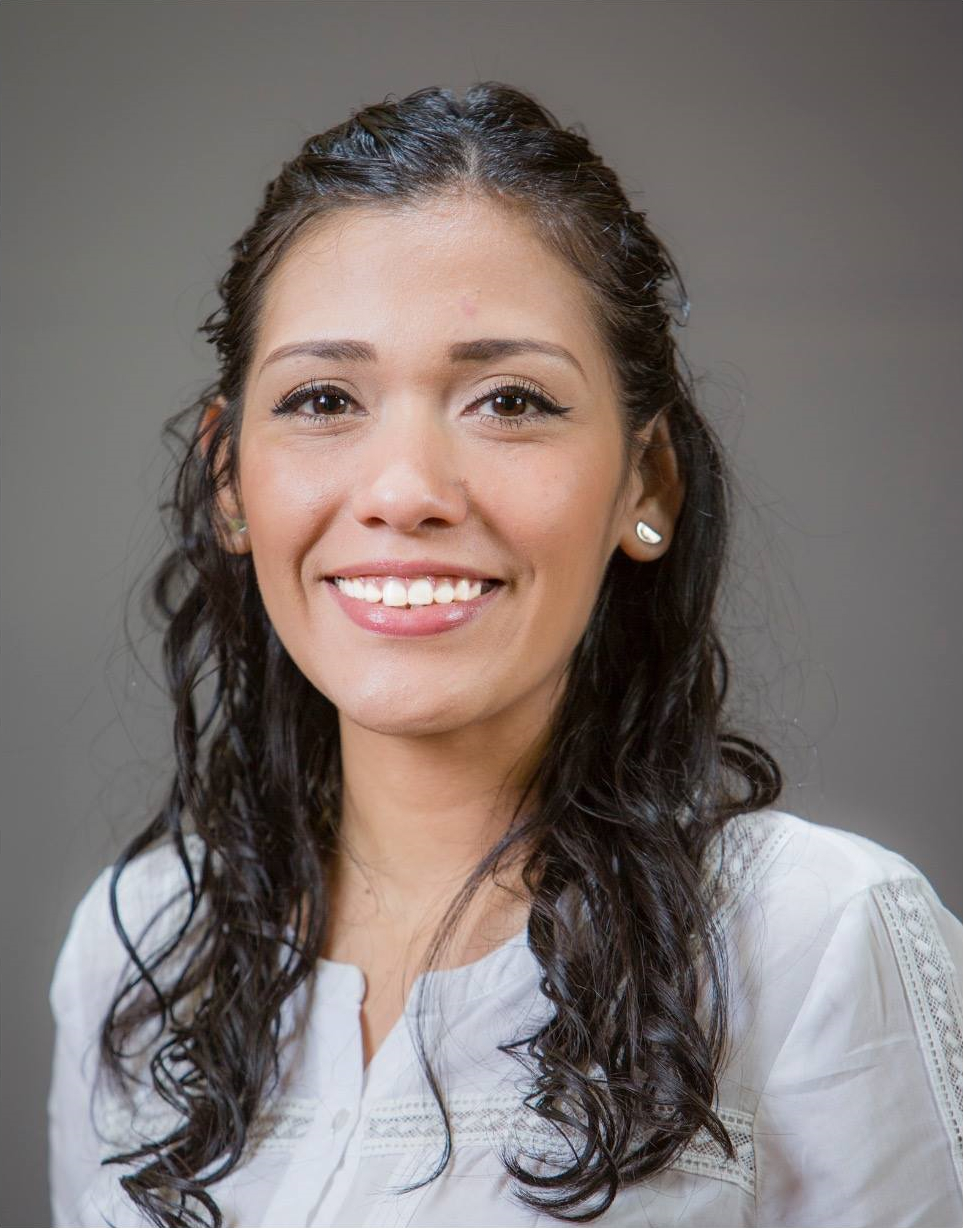
- Official portrait, 2019

President of the Senate
- In office 18 January 2019 – 10 November 2019
- Vice President: First Vice President Rubén Medinaceli; Second Vice President Jeanine Áñez
- Preceded by: Milton Barón
- Succeeded by: Jeanine Áñez (Note: Áñez held the presidency of the Senate for approximately eight minutes on 12 November 2019 between assuming the position at 6:42 p.m. and subsequently assuming the presidency of the State at 6:50 p.m.)

Senator for Santa Cruz
- In office 26 May 2015 – 3 November 2020
- Substitute: Juan José Ric
- Preceded by: Carlos Romero
- Succeeded by: Centa Rek

Substitute Senator for Santa Cruz
- In office 23 January 2015 – 26 May 2015
- Senator: Carlos Romero
- Preceded by: Fátima Velarde
- Succeeded by: Juan José Ric

Personal details
- Born: Adriana Salvatierra Arriaza; 3 June 1989 (age 37) Santa Cruz de la Sierra, Bolivia
- Citizenship: Bolivian; Chilean (2004–2019)
- Party: Movement for Socialism (2006–2025)
- Spouse: Joaquín López (m. 2022)
- Parent(s): Hugo Salvatierra; Luisa Herminia Arriaza
- Education: Gabriel René Moreno University
- Occupation: Political scientist; politician

Adriana Salvatierra Arriaza (born 3 June 1989) is a Bolivian political scientist and politician who served as president of the Senate in 2019. A member of the Movement for Socialism, she served as senator for Santa Cruz from 2015 to 2020 and was a substitute senator for Santa Cruz under Carlos Romero in 2015. At age twenty-nine, Salvatierra was the youngest legislator and third woman to hold the presidency of the Senate and was the youngest individual to ever exert presidential authority, albeit briefly in an acting capacity.

Salvatierra played a pivotal role in the 2019 Bolivian political crisis being the final ruling party authority in the presidential line of succession to resign from their post, paving the way for a two-day vacuum of power and the assumption of office of opposition senator Jeanine Áñez. Salvatierra's resignation was the subject of heavy controversy and debate, with some sectors of the Movement for Socialism regarding her as the primary driver of the party's fall from power in 2019. Nonetheless, in the snap 2020 general elections, Salvatierra was presented as a candidate for member of the Chamber of Deputies but was disqualified from running by the Supreme Electoral Tribunal. She was subsequently nominated as her party's candidate for mayor of Santa Cruz de la Sierra but came in a distant third place, bringing a halt to her previously meteoric political career.

== Early life and career ==
Adriana Salvatierra was born on 3 June 1989 in Santa Cruz de la Sierra to Hugo Salvatierra and Luisa Herminia Arriaza. Salvatierra's upbringing was heavily influenced by the political activities of her parents, both involved in left-wing advocacy in Bolivia and Chile. Her father, Hugo, was a candidate for mayor of Santa Cruz de la Sierra and prefect of the Santa Cruz Department before serving as minister of rural development under Evo Morales from 2006 to 2007. During the military dictatorship of Hugo Banzer, he fled to exile in Chile—then under the presidency of Salvador Allende—where he joined the ranks of the Revolutionary Left Movement (MIR). While in Chile, Salvatierra married Luisa Herminia Arriaza, a rural worker aligned with the Communist Youth, with whom he had one daughter, Adriana's elder sister. Following the fall of Allende, Hugo Salvatierra fled to Europe, while Arriaza and their daughter settled in Bolivia. Approximately thirteen years later, the couple reunited and had their second daughter, Adriana.

By right of jus sanguinis, Salvatierra held Chilean citizenship in addition to her Bolivian citizenship from the age of fourteen; her mother having registered her with the Chilean consulate in Santa Cruz. As of 2024, she is also registered with the Chilean Electoral Service (SERVEL), authorizing her to vote in the Peñalolén commune of the Santiago Metropolitan Region. Despite this, Salvatierra affirmed that she had never exercised her dual nationality to participate in Chilean affairs. Nonetheless, due to the historically antagonistic relationship between Bolivia and Chile, Salvatierra's Chilean heritage became a source of controversy after she assumed the presidency of the Senate. Her status as third in the presidential line of succession caused opposition groups to demand her resignation. Continued rumors about her nationality led Salvatierra to publicly release a photograph of her Bolivian birth certificate, subsequently stating that "I am proudly Bolivian" and assuring that her Chilean heritage was not a source of mixed loyalty. In an interview with Chilean newspaper La Tercera, Salvatierra described Bolivia's maritime demand as "legitimate, historical, [and] fair ... Bolivia was born with access to the Pacific coast and it is legitimate that we have that historical claim". Ultimately, continued criticism forced Salvatierra to publicly renounce her Chilean nationality on 15 February 2019: "I do not want any doubts or speculations to remain and from today this situation is left behind, I opt for a single nationality and I reaffirm my commitment to service and dedication to my country".

As a child, Salvatierra accompanied her father to electoral campaigns, political rallies, and trade union meetings, leading her to become an active member of the Movement for Socialism (MAS-IPSP) at the age of sixteen in 2006. She described her entrance into the MAS as a "natural" decision. In 2008, Salvatierra joined the Southern Column, an urban youth organization established in Santa Cruz. Although not an active association in MAS leadership, the Southern Column was a major organization within the MAS' youth wing. Salvatierra described its work as "an opportunity to build another image of the Santa Cruz youth, which was not from the Youth Union, nor the one that kicked peasants or burned down the headquarters of the Ethnic Peoples Center".

Salvatierra attended the Gabriel René Moreno Autonomous University, graduating in 2013 with a degree in political science and public administration, specializing in political analysis. She later completed a master's degree in human rights and democracy in Latin America in 2022 and as of that year, is employed at the Latin American Strategic Center for Geopolitics. Salvatierra married Joaquín López—her partner and "companion of ideas and struggle" since 2020—on 21 March 2022. López, an Argentine national, was a member of the Peronist Youth and is a journalist by profession. The couple were wed at the Kathia Núñez de Bruun Civil Registry Office in a small, private ceremony attended by friends and family. Their son was born on 7 July 2022 and named Sebastián Andrés, an alias Salvatierra's father used in the 1970s.

== Chamber of Senators ==
In the 2014 general election, Salvatierra was elected to a seat in the Chamber of Senators, serving as substitute senator under Carlos Romero for just four months between January and May 2015. Shortly into his tenure, on 26 May, Romero was appointed to serve as minister of government in the Morales administration, leading Salvatierra to occupy his vacant seat for the duration of her term. Juan José Ric was, in turn, sworn in as Salvatierra's own substitute in September.

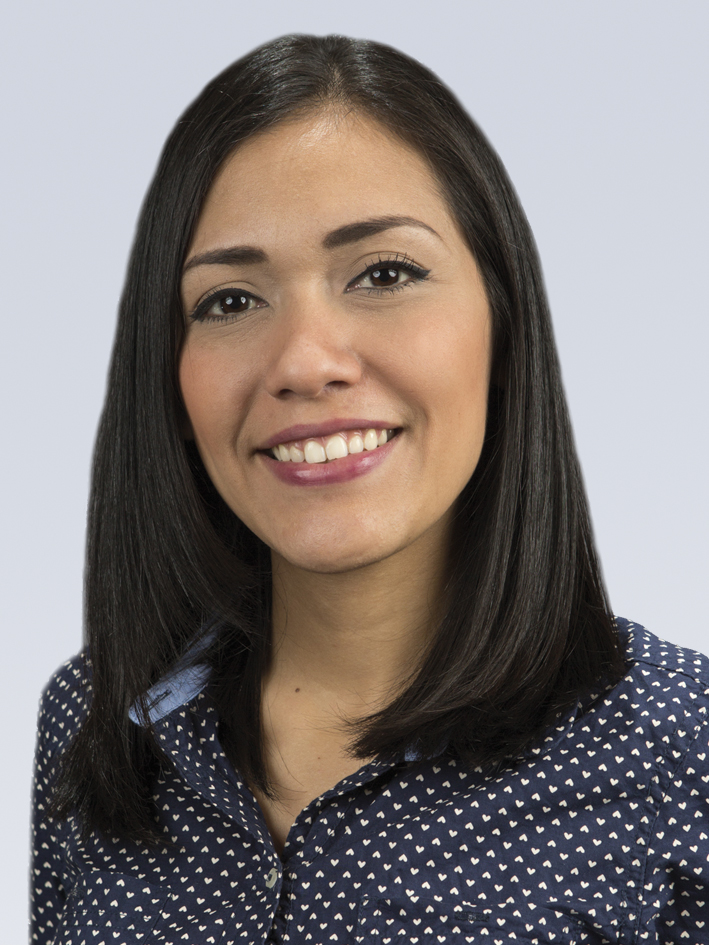
Official portrait, 2015.

=== President of the Senate (2019) ===
On 17 January 2019, the majority MAS caucus elected Salvatierra to serve as president of the Senate for the 2019–2020 legislature; she was sworn in at 5:30 p.m. the following day. Aside from being the third woman to hold the post, at age twenty-nine, Salvatierra was the youngest legislator in the country's history to assume the presidency of the Senate. At her inauguration, Salvatierra highlighted the reform process spearheaded by the MAS since 2006 for having expanded the ability of women and youth to participate in politics.

Upon assuming the presidency of the Senate, Salvatierra was not yet thirty years of age, and as such, per the Constitution, she was not eligible to hold the presidency of the State. This situation was a source of some debate regarding who would hold the acting presidency in the event that both President Evo Morales and Vice President Álvaro García Linera left the country simultaneously. In April, such a scenario occurred when Morales traveled to the United Arab Emirates and García Linera left for Germany. However, at the time, Salvatierra was participating in a conference in Buenos Aires, Argentina, and so President of the Chamber of Deputies Víctor Borda occupied the presidency. Salvatierra turned thirty on 3 June 2019—four months after being elected president of the Senate—resolving the issue. A month later, on 17 July, García Linera traveled to Mexico to attend an international forum while Morales was on a return flight from Argentina, making Salvatierra the acting president of Bolivia for a few hours. This fact made Salvatierra the youngest individual to have ever held executive authority over the country, younger than Antonio José de Sucre, the only other thirty-year-old.

==== Resignation ====
As president of the Senate, Salvatierra was a key figure in the political crisis that rocked the country after President Evo Morales and Vice President Álvaro García Linera jointly resigned from office in the face of accusations of electoral fraud in that year's general elections. Within an hour of their abdications, in a short statement to Red Uno broadcast live at 6:18 p.m., Salvatierra conveyed her decision to tender her resignation to the presidency of the Senate, thus eliminating herself as a contender to assume the presidency. With Salvatierra's resignation, the presidential line of succession outlined by the Constitution was exhausted, (Note: President of the Chamber of Deputies Víctor Borda was the first in the Constitutional line of succession to resign; prior to both Morales and García Linera.) commencing a two-day period in which the country lacked executive power.

===== Motivations =====
In the days preceding Morales' resignation, Salvatierra and Minister of Communication Manuel Canelas met with Antonio Quiroga and Ricardo Paz at Quiroga's office in the Plural publishing house to seek a solution to the crisis in the country. Anticipating a possible Morales resignation, Salvatierra raised her claim to constitutional succession, in which case she would convoke new general elections. This proposal was raised in a phone call with Carlos Mesa—runner-up in the presidential elections and the primary driver of the electoral fraud allegations—who stated that the public would not accept such an outcome and protests would continue.

As recounted by Eva Copa—Salvatierra's successor as president of the Senate—on 13 December, Salvatierra negotiated away her right to constitutional succession in an attempt to avoid the reactivation of legal processes against her father, Hugo Salvatierra. The former minister faced a trial of responsibilities in the legislature for the tractors case; he stood accused of breach of duties and uneconomic conduct for selling agricultural machinery to Mennonite producers rather than allocating it to peasant farmers. The case dated back to 2008, during Morales' first term, but had since stalled for over a decade. Copa alleged that Salvatierra personally admitted to this at a MAS caucus meeting: "by her own voice, [Salvatierra] stated ... [that she] could not assume the [presidency] because they were going to reactivate the process [against her father]".

On 24 January 2020, Salvatierra denied Copa's allegations, assuring that her resignation had been motivated not by personal reasons but by political ones. In a video message, Salvatierra explained that her resignation had been coordinated jointly with Morales and García Linera. She went on to state that succeeding Morales as president would have constituted "not only disloyalty but an act of treason" and that even if she had, the social movements that protested Morales would not have allowed her to govern.

===== Presidential crisis =====
Shortly after her resignation, Salvatierra took refuge in the Mexican Embassy, which granted political asylum to over a dozen ruling party officials following Morales' removal. However, she left not long thereafter after rumors emerged that protesters might attack the facility. Between 11 and 12 November, the Bolivian Episcopal Conference (CEB) organized a series of extra-parliamentary meetings between the various government and civic actors to discuss a solution to the succession crisis. Salvatierra, alongside former minister Ana Teresa Morales, participated on behalf of the MAS. According to the Church's account, "the dialogue was almost impossible due to the constant departures of Senator Adriana Salvatierra from the meeting room to attend or make phone calls. At all times, she insisted that the group ensure the departure of Evo Morales ...". In an interview on the program Influyentes, Salvatierra stated that she considered it illogical that in the peace talks at the CEB, opposition groups would allow a Masista to assume the presidency. Therefore, she admitted having proposed that the Mexican plane seeking to transport Morales out of the country be allowed to enter Bolivian airspace.

At the opening of the following day's meeting, Salvatierra and the other MAS representatives stated that their bloc in the Legislative Assembly would neither vote to accept Morales' resignation nor accept the succession to the presidency of Second Vice President of the Senate Jeanine Áñez. Instead, they proposed that a new president be elected from among the MAS legislators or, if the new president be of the opposition, that it be Senator Víctor Hugo Zamora; both solutions were deemed unconstitutional. Instead, it was proposed that either Salvatierra or Deputy Susana Rivero assume the presidency. Both refused, citing threats against their lives. Ultimately, it was agreed that the MAS would participate in a Legislative Session in which Áñez would be recognized as president of the Senate and, consequently, president of the State. However, the MAS later chose to boycott the legislative session on the basis that its legislators lacked the necessary security guarantees to attend. In a 2021 statement to the Prosecutor's Office, Áñez stated that MAS Senator Omar Aguilera, as well as other ruling party deputies, had informed her that Salvatierra had personally called them to request that they not attend the session. According to the Church's account of events, Salvatierra was offered "total security" on multiple occasions, and a diplomatic vehicle was sent to transport her, but she nonetheless refused to attend the session.

=== Remainder of term ===
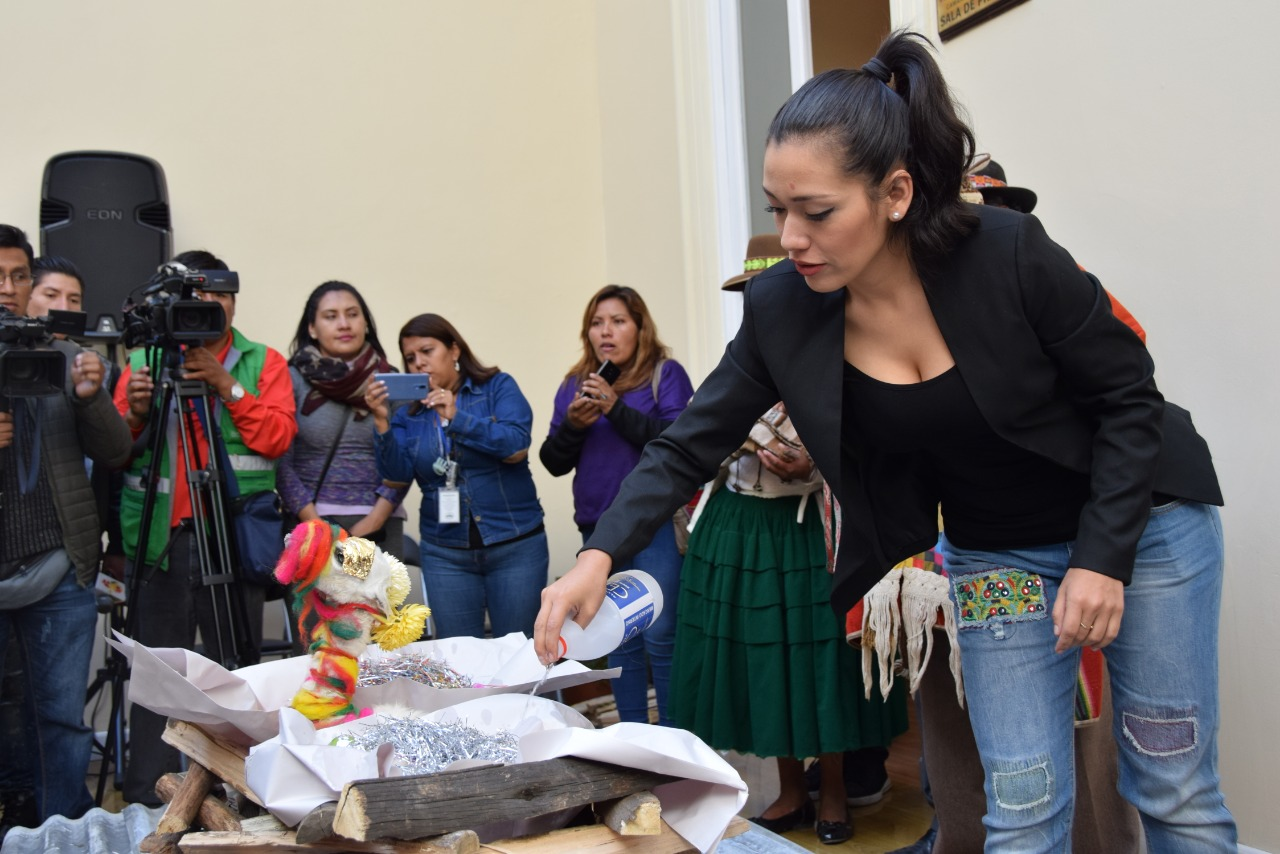
Salvatierra participates in a Ch'alla, an Andean reciprocity ceremony.

On 13 November, Salvatierra contended her resignation, arguing that, while she had publicly announced her intent to resign, Senate regulations establish that her letter of resignation had to be presented before a plenary session of the chamber in order for it to be approved or rejected by its members. Since such a vote had not occurred, some of her fellow assemblymen considered that Salvatierra was still president of the Senate and, therefore, the presidency of the State corresponded to her. Security personnel did not accept this justification and blocked Salvatierra and other MAS legislators from entering the Legislative Assembly, resulting in a scuffle between the opposing sides. This prompted a further Senate session on 14 November, in which Salvatierra's resignation was approved, and Eva Copa was elected to replace her as president of the Senate. Notably, the argument was accepted that Salvatierra's resignation applied only to the presidency of the Senate and, consequently, she maintained her seat as a senator.

Following the election of its new directive, the Senate moved to reconfigure its committees and commissions. Salvatierra was selected to serve on the Constitution Commission, granting her a degree of control over the process of drafting a bill to call new elections. Throughout the negotiation process, Salvatierra sought to facilitate Morales' return to the country so that he could participate as a candidate. This proposal was rejected by both the opposition and other MAS legislators, who deemed it imprudent for Morales to return given the tense social situation. Internal disagreements between the "radical" and "conciliatory" wings of the MAS prevented the commission from approving the draft bill by consensus, forcing the Church and European Union to step in as mediators. After four hours of debate between the two blocs, the commission reconvened, though without Salvatierra's presence, as she refused to attend. Two days later, Áñez promulgated the law convoking fresh general elections with regulations that implicitly barred Morales from participating.

According to Tito Sanjinéz, municipal councilor for the MAS in Santa Cruz, Salvatierra's resignation was blamed for having "opened the door to the succession of [Áñez]". Consequently, in an extended meeting between itself and various allied social movements, the MAS determined not to re-nominate her as a candidate for any post in either legislative chamber in the snap general elections scheduled for 2020. However, the party later reversed this decision and registered her on its electoral list as a candidate for deputy for Santa Cruz. Deputy Edgar Montaño's justification was that the MAS had opted to nominate Salvatierra based on her merits to hold the position. Nonetheless, the Supreme Electoral Tribunal later disqualified her candidacy for failing to meet eleven of the twelve requirements for registration.

== Later political career ==
Shortly after completing her term in the Senate, Salvatierra faced expulsion from the MAS by the party's eastern wing. In November 2020, a congress of peasant federations convened in Santa Cruz de la Sierra to analyze the possible expulsion of both Salvatierra and Carlos Romero, considering them to be "authors of internal division and traitors of the MAS", as reported by Deputy Rolando Cuéllar. In the case of Salvatierra, she was once again accused of facilitating Áñez's succession by resigning from her post. Ultimately, the congress determined to expel Romero but not Salvatierra. Shortly thereafter, on 13 December, the Urban Directorate of the MAS in Santa Cruz de la Sierra proclaimed Salvatierra as the party's candidate for mayor of the city. Despite assuring that the MAS would do "much better at the ballot boxes than in the polls", Salvatierra's campaign ended in a distant third place, having obtained 16.53 percent of the vote. Jhonny Fernández, leader of Solidarity Civic Unity, emerged as the victor in that election.

== Electoral history ==
Electoral history of Adriana Salvatierra
Year	Office	Party	Votes			Result	Ref.
Year	Office	Party	Total	%	P.	Result	Ref.
2014	Sub. Senator	Movement for Socialism	623,313	48.99%	1st (Note: Presented on an electoral list. The data shown represents the share of the vote the entire party/alliance received in that constituency.)	Won	
2019	Deputy	Movement for Socialism	550,198	34.76%	2nd	Annulled	
2020	Deputy	Movement for Socialism	Disqualified			Lost	
2021	Mayor	Movement for Socialism	148,640	16.53%	3rd	Lost	
Source: Plurinational Electoral Organ | Electoral Atlas

Senate of Bolivia
Preceded by Fátima Velarde	Substitute Senator for Santa Cruz; 2015; Served alongside: Anderson Cáceres, María Lourdes Landívar, Carlos Pablo Klinsky	Succeeded by Juan José Ric
Preceded by Carlos Romero	Senator for Santa Cruz; 2015–2020; Served alongside: Felipa Merino, Oscar Ortiz, María Elva Pinckert, María Lourdes Landívar, Carlos Pablo Klinsky	Succeeded by Centa Rek
Preceded by Milton Barón	President of the Senate; 2019	Succeeded by Jeanine Áñez
