= Pachakuti Indigenous Movement =

Pachakuti Indigenous Movement Movimiento Indígena Pachakuti
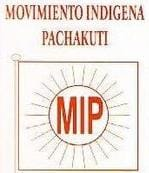
- Leader: Felipe Quispe
- Founded: 2000
- Dissolved: 18 December 2005
- Ideology: Indigenismo; Minority politics Socialism; Marxism; Aymara nationalism Left-wing nationalism
- Political position: Left-wing

The Pachakuti Indigenous Movement (Spanish: Movimiento Indígena Pachakuti) was an indigenist political party in Bolivia founded in November 2000. It has been accused of racism.

At the legislative elections in 2002, the party and its candidate at the presidential elections, Felipe Quispe, won 6.1% of the popular vote. of the popular vote and 6 out of 130 seats in the Chamber of Deputies and none out of 27 seats in the Senate.

At the legislative elections in 2005, the party won 2.2% and its presidential candidate Felipe Quispe Huanca of the popular vote and no seats.

== See also ==
- Policarpio Castañeta Yujra
