= Rafael Dávila Egüez =

Ecuadorian politician

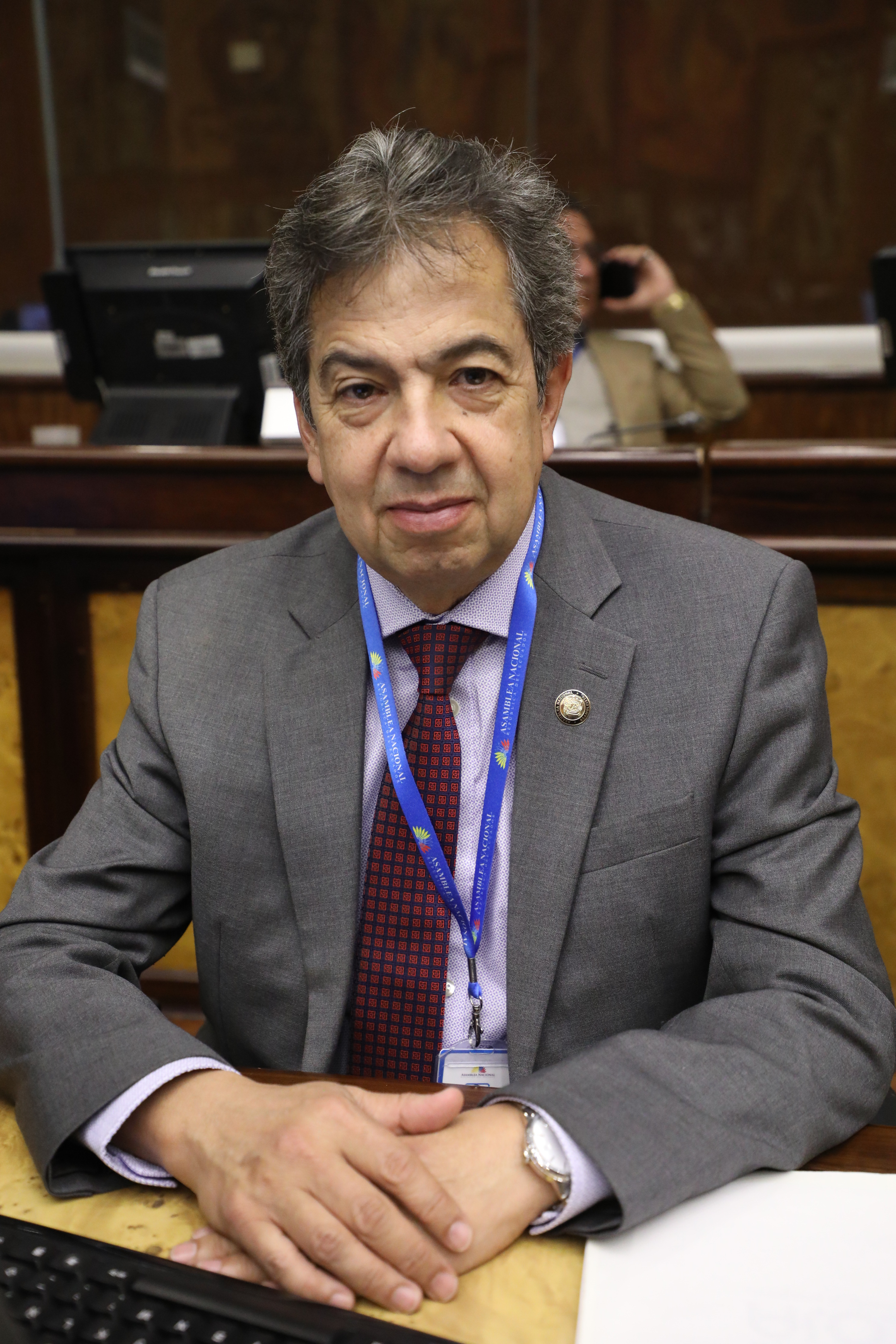
- Egüez in 2024

Prefect of Loja Province
- In office May 14, 2014 – May 14, 2023
- Preceded by: Ruben Bustamante
- Succeeded by: Mario Mancino

National Assemblyman of Ecuador
- Incumbent
- Assumed office November 17, 2023

National Deputy of Ecuador for Loja
- In office August 10, 1998 – January 5, 2007

Personal details
- Born: February 12, 1960 (age 66) Quito, Ecuador
- Education: National Polytechnic School
- Profession: Engineer

Rafael Antonio Dávila Egüez is an Ecuadorian politician and engineer who served as the prefect of Loja Province from 2014 to 2023. Since November 2023, he has served in the National Assembly of Ecuador.

== Biography ==
Dávila Egüez was born on February 12, 1960, in Quito. He studied engineering at the National Polytechnic School where he obtained a postgraduate degree in industrial engineering. He also worked as a professor at the National University of Loja, and also served as the president of the Chamber of Industries of Loja.

In the 1998 legislative elections, Dávila Egüez was elected as a deputy for Loja Province for the Democracia Popular party. He was re-elected in 2002, at which point his party had formed an alliance with the Democratic Left and the Ecuadorian Regional Integration Movement. In early 2005, he decried inconsistencies in the declaration of assets submitted by Loja deputy Jorge Montero Rodriguez, accusing Montero of keeping many of his properties under the name of family members, along with other forms of corruption.

In the 2009 Ecuadorian legislative elections, Dávila Egüez was elected as an assemblyman for Loja Province by the Citizens Consciousness movement. During this time, he opposed the policies of Rafael Correa.

In 2014, Dávila Egüez ran for prefect of Loja Province, supported by an alliance between CREO and Convocatoria por la Unidad Provincial movements. Egüez won with 39.8% of the vote against his opponent's 29.84%. Egüez ran on a platform of improving road infrastructure, production, and irrigation systems. He was re-elected in the 2019 Ecuadorian local elections.
