= New Republican Force =

New Republican Force Nueva Fuerza Republicana
- Leader: Manfred Reyes Villa
- Founded: 1995
- Dissolved: 2006
- Succeeded by: Plan Progress for Bolivia – National Convergence
- Headquarters: La Paz, Bolivia
- Ideology: Populism; Conservatism
- Political position: Centre-right

The New Republican Force (Spanish: Nueva Fuerza Republicana, NFR) is a center-right political party in Bolivia. It is mainly based in the department of Cochabamba.

== History ==
The NFR was founded in 1995. After the Assembly for the Sovereignty of the Peoples' (ASP) success in the 1999 municipal elections in Cochabamba, the NFR offered ASP leader Alejo Véliz and other peasant activists top candidate positions and won them over.

At the legislative elections in 2002, the party won 26.5% of the popular vote and 27 out of 130 seats in the Chamber of Deputies and two out of 27 seats in the Senate. Its candidate at the presidential elections, Manfred Reyes Villa, won 20.9% of the popular vote. After the election, the party joined the multiparty coalition of president Gonzalo Sánchez de Lozada of the Revolutionary Nationalist Movement (MNR). In October 2003, the NFR decided to leave the coalition and Reyes Villa and the other three NFR ministers resigned. This deprived the president of his congressional majority and forced him to resign.

In the 2005 general elections the party received 0.7% of the popular vote and failed to win a seat. Its presidential candidate was Gildo Angulo Cabrera. In September 2009, Manfred Reyes Villa participated in the formation of a broad oppositional coalition called Plan Progress for Bolivia – National Convergence (PPB-CN). The coalition's candidate in the 2009 presidential election was NFR's leader Reyes Villa.
