= Isaac Ávalos =

Bolivian politician

Isaac Ávalos Cuchallo is a Bolivian politician and activist. As of 2010 he is the Secretary General of the Confederación Sindical Única de Trabajadores Campesinos de Bolivia (CSUTCB). He also contested for a position of senator of the Santa Cruz Department.
