= Juan Carlos Durán =

Bolivian politician (1949–2023)

Juan Carlos Durán Saucedo (29 July 1949 – 13 July 2023) was a Bolivian lawyer, sports executive, and politician.

He was Minister of the Interior under Victor Paz Estenssoro from 1987 to 1989, and President of the Chamber of Senators of Bolivia from 1993 to 1994, and again from 1995 to 1996.

In 1997, Durán stood as the Movimento Nacionalista Revolucionario presidential candidate at the 1997 Bolivian general election, finishing second.

Aside from politics, he was also President of Real Santa Cruz. Durán died of cancer on 13 July 2023, at the age of 73. After his death, Real Santa Cruz released a statement remarking that Durán's "tireless efforts and dedication to the club will always be remembered."
