= 2005 Bolivian general election =

- 18 December 2005
- Registered: 3,671,152
- Turnout: 84.50% (▲12.61pp)
- Presidential election
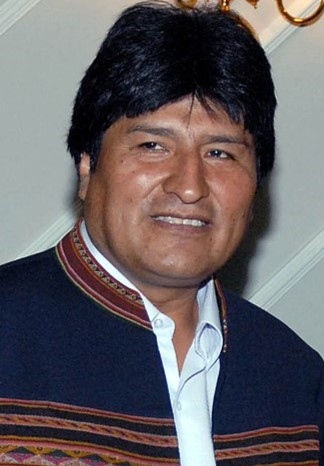

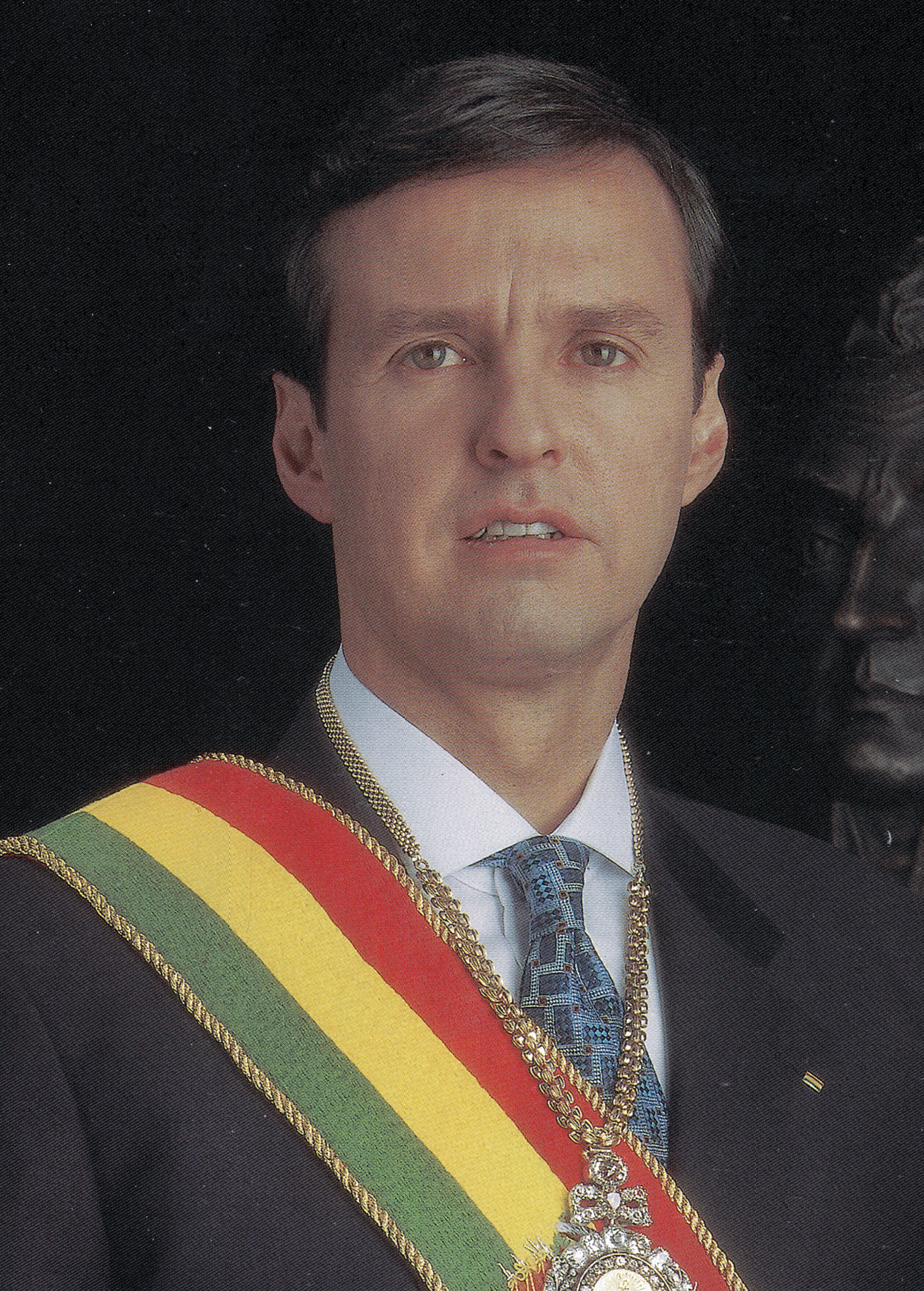

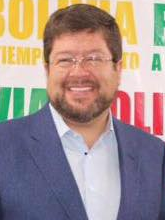

Nominee	Evo Morales	Jorge Quiroga
Party	MAS-IPSP	Podemos
Running mate	Álvaro García Linera	María Duchen
Popular vote	1,544,374	821,745
Percentage	53.74%	28.59%
Nominee	Samuel Doria Medina	Michiaki Nagatani
Party	UN	MNR
Running mate	Carlos Dabdoub	Guillermo Bedregal
Popular vote	224,090	185,859
Percentage	7.80%	6.47%
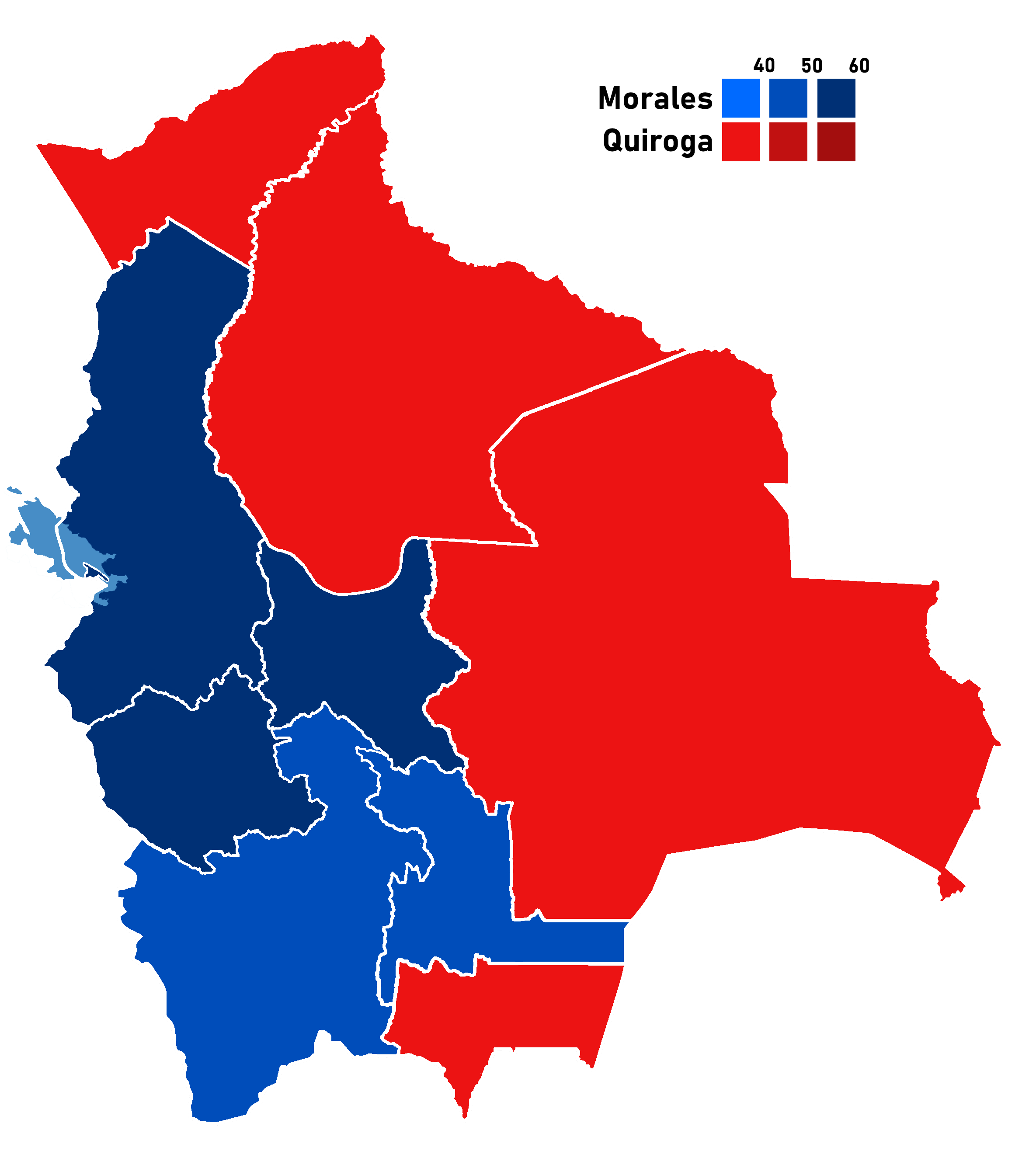
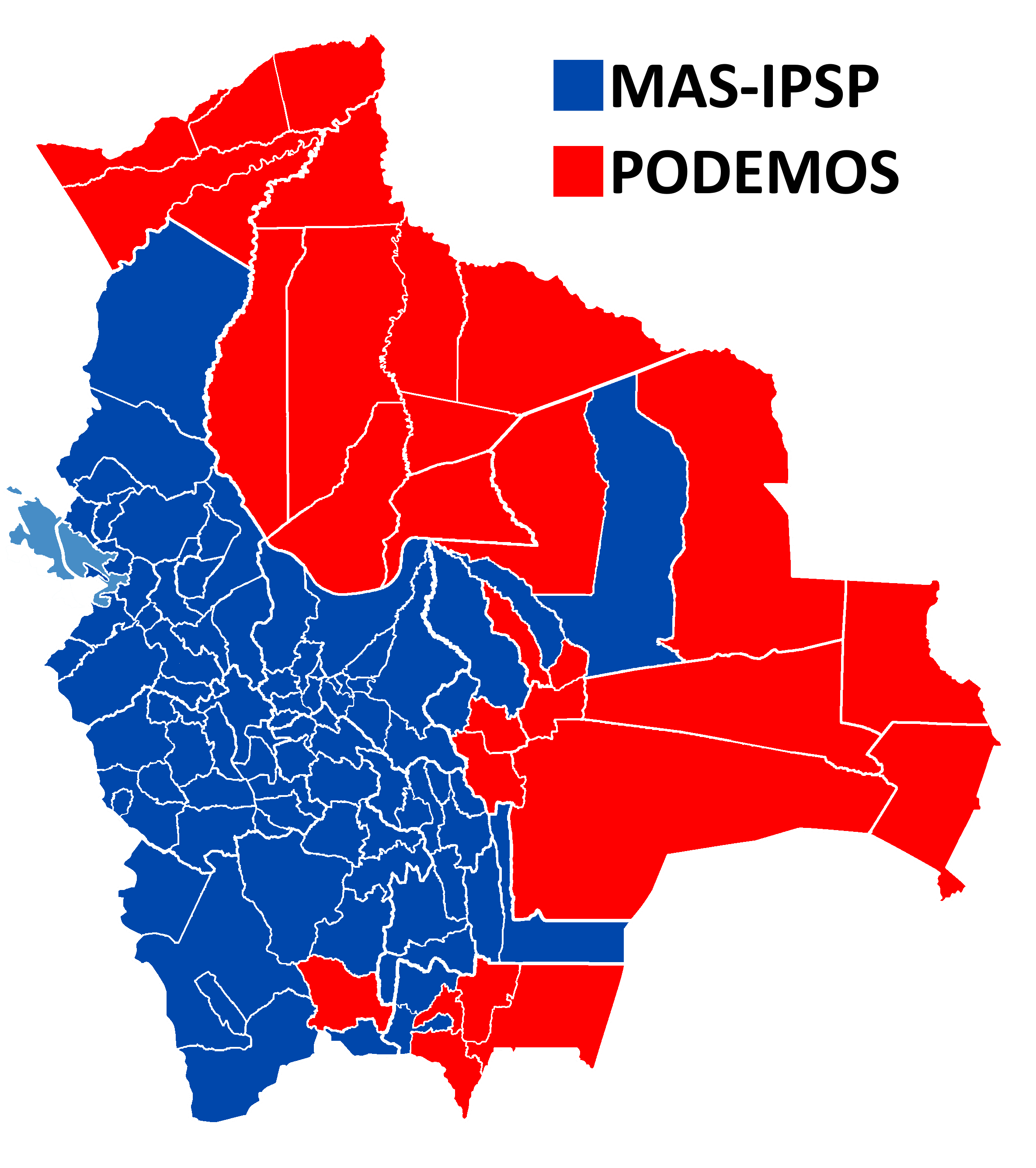
President before election
Eduardo Rodríguez (interim)
Independent
Elected President
Evo Morales
MAS-IPSP
- Legislative election
- All 36 seats in the Chamber of Senators; All 130 seats in the Chamber of Deputies
Party	Seats	+/–
Chamber of Senators
Podemos	13	New
MAS-IPSP	12	+4
UN	1	New
MNR	1	−9
Chamber of Deputies
MAS-IPSP	72	+45
Podemos	43	New
UN	8	New
MNR	7	−29
This lists parties that won seats. See the complete results below.

General elections were held in Bolivia on 18 December 2005. Evo Morales of the Movement for Socialism (MAS) party was elected President of Bolivia with 54% of the vote, the first time a candidate had received an absolute majority since the flawed 1978 elections. Morales was sworn in on 22 January 2006 for a five-year term. The MAS also won a majority of seats in the Chamber of Deputies and emerged as the largest party in the Senate.

Simultaneously voters elected prefects, the highest executive office in each of Bolivia's nine departments. This was the first time the office had been chosen at the ballot box. Subsequently, departmental elections were held separately from national elections, with the next one held in April 2010.

== Background ==
In the early 2000s there were high levels of political instability across the country, including five presidents in four years. Much of the instability dates back to the economic reforms otherwise known as "shock therapy" implemented by President Gonzalo Sánchez de Lozada whereby many formerly public utilities were privatized.

These reforms ultimately led to the First Bolivian Gas War in October 2003 where protesters, many of them of indigenous descent, essentially forced the resignation of Sánchez de Lozada. Vice President Carlos Mesa took office as president.

In his year in office, Mesa held a national referendum on the prospect of the nationalization of the hydrocarbons industry which he claimed to have won. Critics however said that the questions were vague and ambiguous with regard to outright nationalization of the hydrocarbons industry.

In May 2005 the Second Bolivian Gas War began after Congress agreed to raise taxes on foreign companies from 18% to 32%. The unions, led by Evo Morales, felt the law did not go far enough and effectively shut down the country, blockading major roads and cutting off the food supplies of several large cities.

In June 2005 the protests ultimately led to Mesa's resignation. Supreme Court Chief Justice Eduardo Rodríguez assumed the position of interim President of the Republic after the presidents of both the Senate and Chamber of Deputies declined the position and Rodríguez was fourth in line of succession.

Viewed as an apolitical figure, Rodríguez was welcomed by protesters and called for the presidential elections slated to take place in 2007 to be brought forward to December 2005.

== Electoral system ==
Voters had two ballots: a national-level ballot to elect the president and the nationally elected members of Congress, and one for members of Congress elected in single-member constituencies in the Chamber of Deputies. Senators and deputies were returned on a departmental basis; senators were elected on a majoritarian basis, with the first-place party receiving two and the second-place party one, while deputies were elected on a mixed-member basis, with district deputies joining list deputies awarded by compensatory proportional representation. However, there was no national distribution of seats.

Voting was compulsory for all Bolivians over the age of 18, but Bolivians living abroad were not able to take part.

== Results ==
=== President ===
Candidate	Running mate	Party	Votes	%
Evo Morales	Álvaro García Linera	Movement for Socialism	1,544,374	53.74
Jorge Quiroga	María Duchen	Social and Democratic Power	821,745	28.59
Samuel Doria Medina	Carlos Dabdoub	National Unity Front	224,090	7.80
Michiaki Nagatani	Guillermo Bedregal	Revolutionary Nationalist Movement	185,859	6.47
Felipe Quispe	Camila Choqueticlla	Pachakuti Indigenous Movement	61,948	2.16
Gildo Angulo Cabrera	Gonzalo Quiroga	New Republican Force	19,667	0.68
Eliceo Rodríguez Pari	Rodolfo Flores	Agrarian Patriotic Front	8,737	0.30
Néstor García Rojas	Julio Antonio Uzquiano	Social Union of the Workers of Bolivia	7,381	0.26
Total			2,873,801	100.00
Valid votes			2,873,801	92.63
Invalid votes			104,570	3.37
Blank votes			124,046	4.00
Total votes			3,102,417	100.00
Registered voters/turnout			3,671,152	84.51
Source: IFES, IFES

=== Chamber of Deputies ===
Party	Proportional			Constituency			Total seats	+/–
Party	Votes	%	Seats	Votes	%	Seats	Total seats	+/–
Movement for Socialism	1,544,374	53.74	27	968,120	43.52	45	72	+45
Social and Democratic Power	821,745	28.59	21	625,230	28.10	22	43	+39
National Unity Front	224,090	7.80	7	260,290	11.70	1	8	New
Revolutionary Nationalist Movement	185,859	6.47	5	179,319	8.06	2	7	–
Pachakuti Indigenous Movement	61,948	2.16	0	73,499	3.30	0	0	–6
New Republican Force	19,667	0.68	0	53,634	2.41	0	0	–25
Agrarian Patriotic Front	8,737	0.30	0	48,322	2.17	0	0	New
Social Union of the Workers of Bolivia	7,381	0.26	0	16,298	0.73	0	0	New
Total	2,873,801	100.00	60	2,224,712	100.00	70	130	0
Valid votes	2,873,801	92.63		2,224,712	71.91			
Invalid votes	104,570	3.37		90,016	2.91			
Blank votes	124,046	4.00		779,152	25.18			
Total votes	3,102,417	100.00		3,093,880	100.00			
Registered voters/turnout	3,671,152	84.51		3,671,152	84.28			
Source: Election Passport, IPU

=== Chamber of Senators ===
Party	Votes	%	Seats	+/–
Movement for Socialism	1,544,374	53.74	12	+4
Social and Democratic Power	821,745	28.59	13	+12
National Unity Front	224,090	7.80	1	New
Revolutionary Nationalist Movement	185,859	6.47	1	–
Pachakuti Indigenous Movement	61,948	2.16	0	0
New Republican Force	19,667	0.68	0	–2
Agrarian Patriotic Front	8,737	0.30	0	New
Social Union of the Workers of Bolivia	7,381	0.26	0	New
Total	2,873,801	100.00	27	0
Valid votes	2,873,801	92.63		
Invalid votes	104,570	3.37		
Blank votes	124,046	4.00		
Total votes	3,102,417	100.00		
Registered voters/turnout	3,671,152	84.51		
Source: IFES, IFES

== Aftermath ==
Morales claimed his victory marked Bolivia's first election of an indigenous head of state, but this claim generated controversy, due to the number of mestizo presidents who came before him, and was challenged publicly by such figures as Mario Vargas Llosa, who accused Morales of fomenting racial divisions in an increasingly mestizo Latin America.
