= Democratic Unity =

Bolivian electoral and political coalition

Democratic Unity Unidad Demócrata
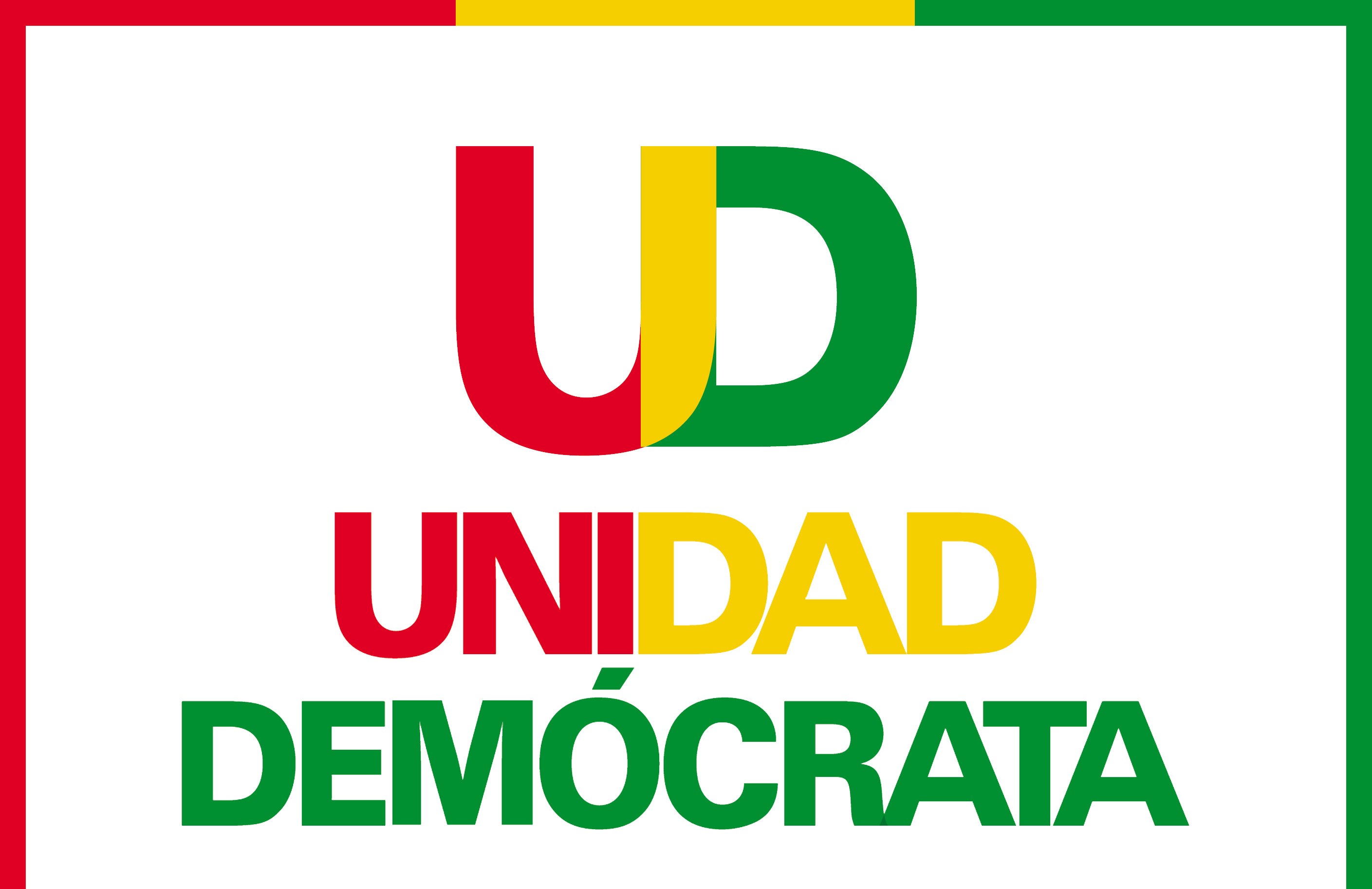
- Abbreviation: UD
- President: Rubén Costas
- Founders: Rubén Costas; Samuel Doria Medina
- Founded: 17 June 2014; 11 years ago
- Succeeded by: Bolivia Says No
- Ideology: Autonomism; Regionalism; Social democracy
- Political position: Center-left to center-right
- Colors: Red; Yellow; Green
- Coalition members: UN; MDS

Coalition symbol
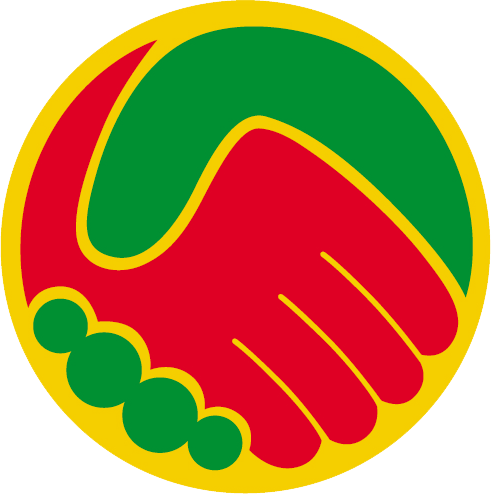

Democratic Unity (Spanish: Unidad Demócrata; UD) was a center-left to center-right electoral and political coalition in Bolivia. It was formed on 17 June 2014 by the National Unity Front and the Social Democratic Movement to contest the 2014 general elections.
