= 3rd Plurinational Legislative Assembly of Bolivia =

2020–2025 meeting of Bolivian legislature

←	2nd	4th	→
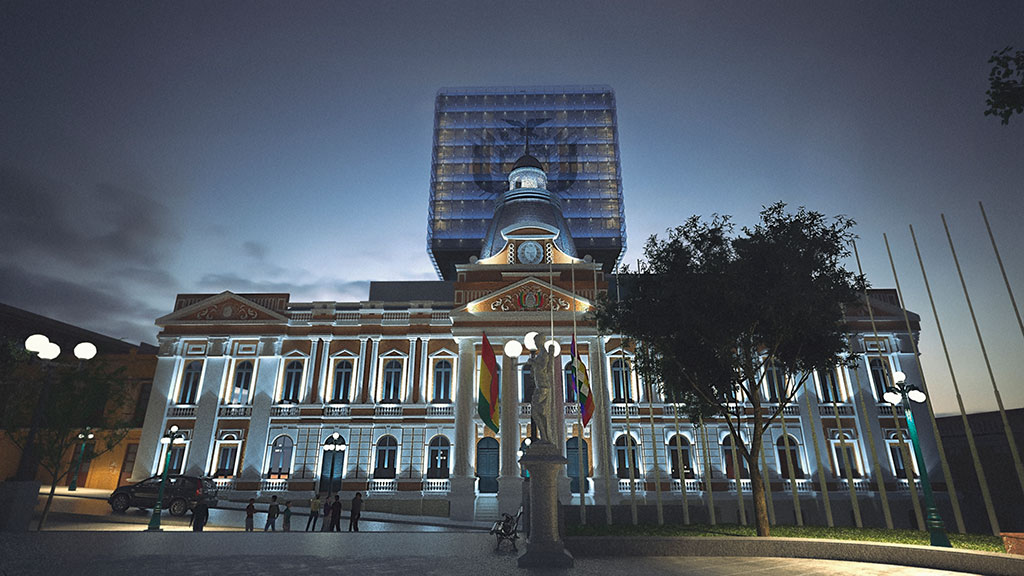
- The defunct Legislative Palace and the new Legislative Assembly headquarters

Overview
- Legislative body: Plurinational Legislative Assembly
- Meeting place: New ALP Building, Plaza Murillo, La Paz
- Term: 3 November 2020 – 6 November 2025
- Election: 2020 general election
- Government: Movement for Socialism
- Opposition: Civic Community; Creemos
- Website: vicepresidencia.gob.bo web.senado.gob.bo diputados.gob.bo

Chamber of Senators
- Members: 36
- President of the Assembly (Note: Ex officio as vice president.): David Choquehuanca (MAS-IPSP)
- President of the Senate: Andrónico Rodríguez (MAS-IPSP)
- First Vice President: Gladys Alarcón (MAS-IPSP)
- Second Vice President: Vania Rocha (CC)
- Party control: Movement for Socialism

Chamber of Deputies
- Members: 130
- President of the Chamber of Deputies: Jerges Mercado Suárez (MAS-IPSP)
- First Vice President: Hernán Durán (MAS-IPSP)
- Second Vice President: Ingvar Ellefsen (CC)
- Party control: Movement for Socialism

The 3rd Plurinational Legislative Assembly of Bolivia (Spanish: 3° Asamblea Legislativa Plurinacional de Bolivia; ALP) was a meeting of the legislative branch of the Bolivian government, composed of the Chamber of Senators and the Chamber of Deputies. It convened in La Paz on 3 November 2020, during the final week of Jeanine Áñez's presidency, and ended on 6 November 2025. It meet during all five years of Luis Arce's presidency.

The 2020 general elections decided control of both chambers. In both the Chamber of Deputies and Senate, the Movement for Socialism retained its majority—albeit reduced from the two-thirds supermajority from the 2nd Plurinational Legislative Assembly. This assembly marks the first time women make up the majority of the legislature as a whole at 51.9 percent of parliamentarians. In the Senate, women make up the absolute majority at 55.5 percent of senators, while in the Chamber of Deputies, they reach near gender parity at 46.9 percent of deputies.

This legislature has been characterized by frequent inter-party conflicts and quarrels. The ruling Movement for Socialism failed to attain a supermajority in either chamber—as it had done in the previous assemblies—granting the opposition a higher degree of discretion over decisions requiring the support of two-thirds of legislators. However, amendments to the regulations of both chambers approved by the preceding legislature shortly before this assembly's formal installation abrogated the two-thirds requirement for numerous parliamentary procedures, leading political analysts to note the effective neutralization of the opposition's ability to operate. Subsequent disputes and accusations by the opposition of abuse of parliamentary procedure purportedly perpetrated by the ruling party have resulted in disorderly behavior and even physical violence during legislative sessions regarding the election of members to commissions and the passage of controversial bills.

== History ==
=== Two-thirds controversy ===
Though the Movement for Socialism (MAS-IPSP) achieved a first-round victory in the 2020 general elections, winning absolute majorities in both the Senate—nineteen seats—and Chamber of Deputies—sixty-six seats—the party fell just shy of attaining a supermajority of two-thirds of the legislators in either chamber, as it had done in the two previous legislative terms. In the Senate, the MAS won twenty-one seats, three short of the twenty-four necessary to achieve a two-thirds majority in that chamber, and in the lower house, it won seventy-five seats; eighty-seven deputies are required to reach a supermajority in the Chamber of Deputies, leaving the MAS twelve seats short. In total, of the 166 seats making up both chambers, the MAS held ninety-six, leaving it fourteen behind of the 110 votes necessary to attain two-thirds in a plenary session. As a result, the MAS was placed in a situation in which it would be forced to negotiate with the opposition on matters requiring two-thirds of the assembly's support, a fact that had not been the case for over a decade, since the opening of the 2010–2015 legislature in January 2010. Political Scientist Franklin Pareja noted that, without two-thirds, the MAS would no longer be able to circumvent legislative debate and pass laws without discussing with the opposition, as it had grown accustomed to doing in previous years. For Pareja, this would hopefully provide for a "healthier" legislature.

In this context, a major controversy arose when on 27 and 28 October 2020, both chambers in the outgoing assembly used the final hours of their term to amend the articles of their general regulations, eliminating the two-thirds threshold for measures such as the modification of parliamentary committees, the agenda for sessions, promotions of certain public and military officials, and the appointment of ambassadors, reducing the requirement to a simple majority. However, measures requiring two-thirds of both chambers as established by the Constitution, such as the appointment of the prosecutor general, the ombudsman, the comptroller, or members of the Supreme Electoral Tribunal, remained unchanged.

Outgoing Senator Ciro Zabala (MAS) explained the new rules as "an administrative change" meant to push aside "obstacles" to Luis Arce's mandate. For his part, President-elect Arce endorsed the move, stating that "what our Assembly has done is maintain legality ... and there should be no concern". Nonetheless, the opposition denounced the change. Outgoing Deputy Shirley Franco called it "an affront to democracy. They eliminate the two-thirds to nullify the opposition". At the same time, Carlos Mesa, leader of Civic Community (CC), decried the rule change as an "unacceptable and illegitimate maneuver". Similarly, Creemos leader Luis Fernando Camacho characterized the regulatory amendment as an "outrage", stating: "the MAS will never leave behind its dictatorial impulse". Newspaper Página Siete reported that, in this way, "[the] MAS [has] neutralize[d] the opposition for five years", primarily due to the fact that the ruling party was now capable of closing legislative debate by a simple majority. Political analyst Williams Bascopé also noted that the MAS' ability to change the legislative agenda at will provided for the possibility of opposition legislators entering the assembly without being informed of what would be discussed in that session.

At Arce's inauguration, Mesa and the entire CC caucus left the hemicycle of the Plurinational Legislative Assembly in protest prior to the end of the ceremony. In a press conference, Mesa announced CC's intent to file an appeal with the Plurinational Constitutional Court (TCP), demanding the unconstitutionality of the annulment of the two-thirds requirement. Three days later, the alliance formally presented the TCP with an appeal containing the signatures of all fifty CC legislators. In late November, the TCP rejected the motion on technical grounds, arguing that the coalition had not gone through the proper legal channels in the Legislative Assembly before bringing their case to the court. Two separate appeals filed by Creemos were also declared inadmissible by the TCP. Creemos Senator Centa Rek denounced that the court's rulings demonstrated its "absolute submission" before the government.

=== New assembly building ===
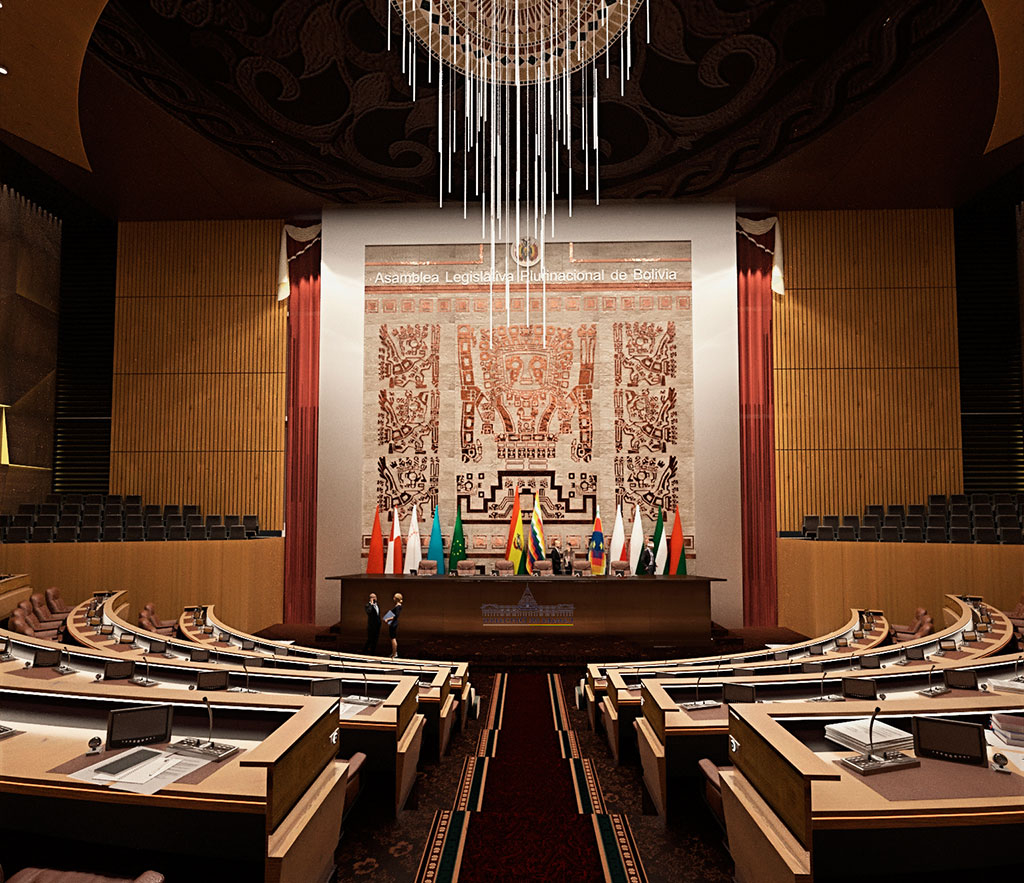
Bench of the Chamber of Deputies' Directive Board in the hemicycle of the lower house.

This legislative session saw the completion and inauguration of a new Plurinational Assembly headquarters to replace the previous Legislative Palace. The decision to establish a new building was sanctioned by Law N° 313, which also authorized the erection of a new executive building, the Casa Grande del Pueblo, completed in 2018. Construction began in 2016 under the charge of the firm Asociación Accidental Constructoras Bolivianas (CONSTRUBOL). By the end, the total State investment in the project amounted to Bs473.2 million.

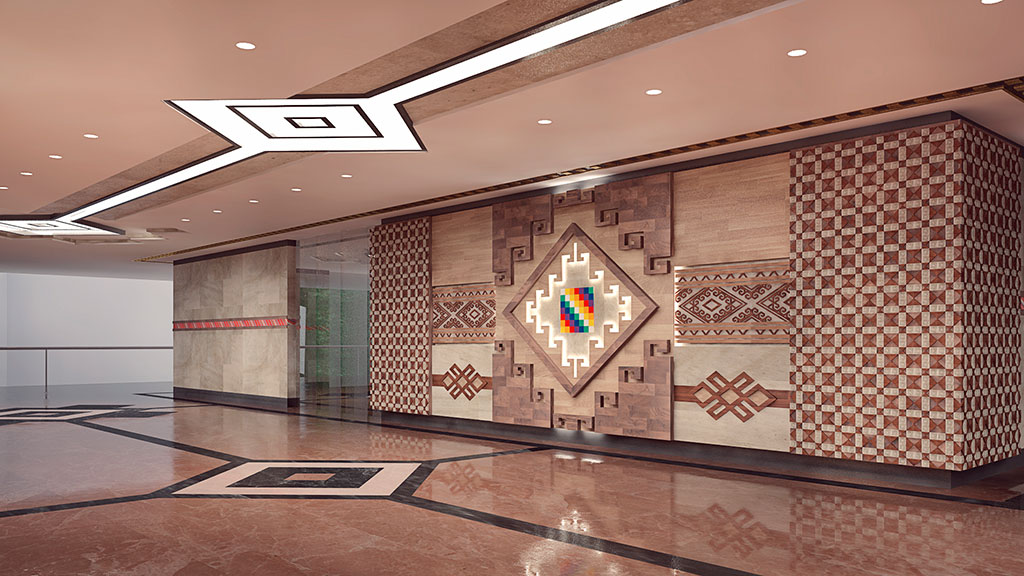
A hallway adorned with Aymara and Quechua iconography and symbols.

The new legislature covers 44,000m^{2} with nine underground levels and twenty above-ground floors, allowing it to be seen from anywhere in La Paz and El Alto. It is topped by a cubic structure containing the hemicycle of the Chamber of Senators on levels fourteen and fifteen and the Chamber of Deputies on levels seventeen through twenty. The cube measures a length of thirty-six meters, meant to represent the thirty-six nationally recognized indigenous nations. Additionally, the various offices and corridors are adorned with motifs and artwork from all of these groups.

The new building was inaugurated on 2 August 2020 with the presence of the president, vice president, and most legislators of the ruling party. In his speech, President Arce declared that the legislature symbolized "a new stage" in the country's history. Vice President David Choquehuanca pointed to its establishment as a measure of "decolonized thinking" in the country. Likewise, President of the Chamber of Deputies Freddy Mamani stated that, with the inauguration of the new infrastructure, Bolivia entered a new era, definitively leaving behind the Republic of Bolivia that was superseded by the Plurinational State through the passage of the 2009 Constitution.

Neither CC nor Creemos participated in the inauguration of the new building. In a statement, CC characterized its establishment as "an affront to the country" that wastes economic resources in the midst of a health crisis in order to "satisfy the megalomania of Evo Morales". Senator Rek stated that the decision of its caucus not to attend was due to the fact it had "nothing to celebrate ... because we are cut in our rights and legislative functions, and they do not allow us to participate and influence the laws that are approved".

=== Defection in the opposition ===
==== Ethics Commission I ====
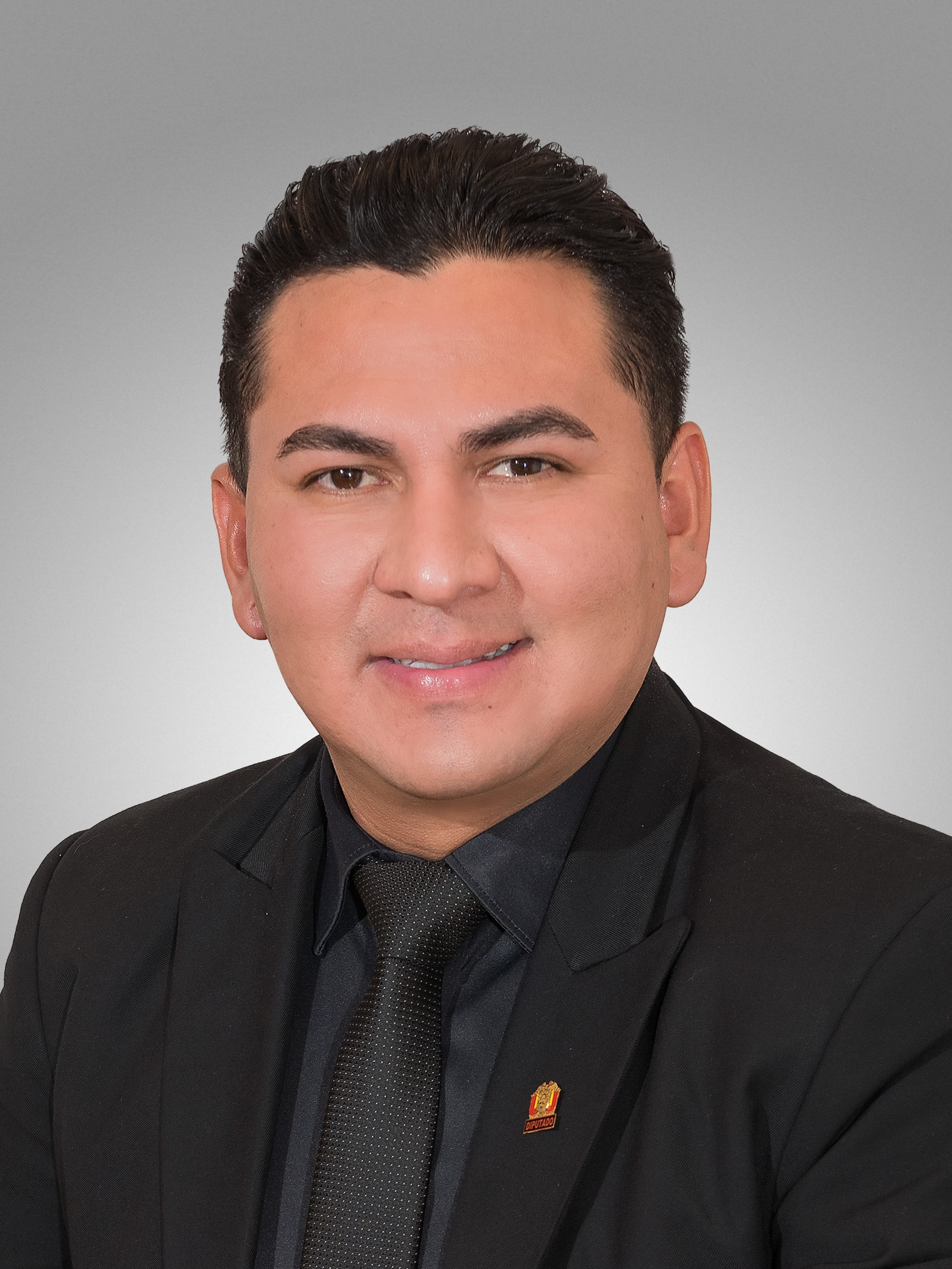
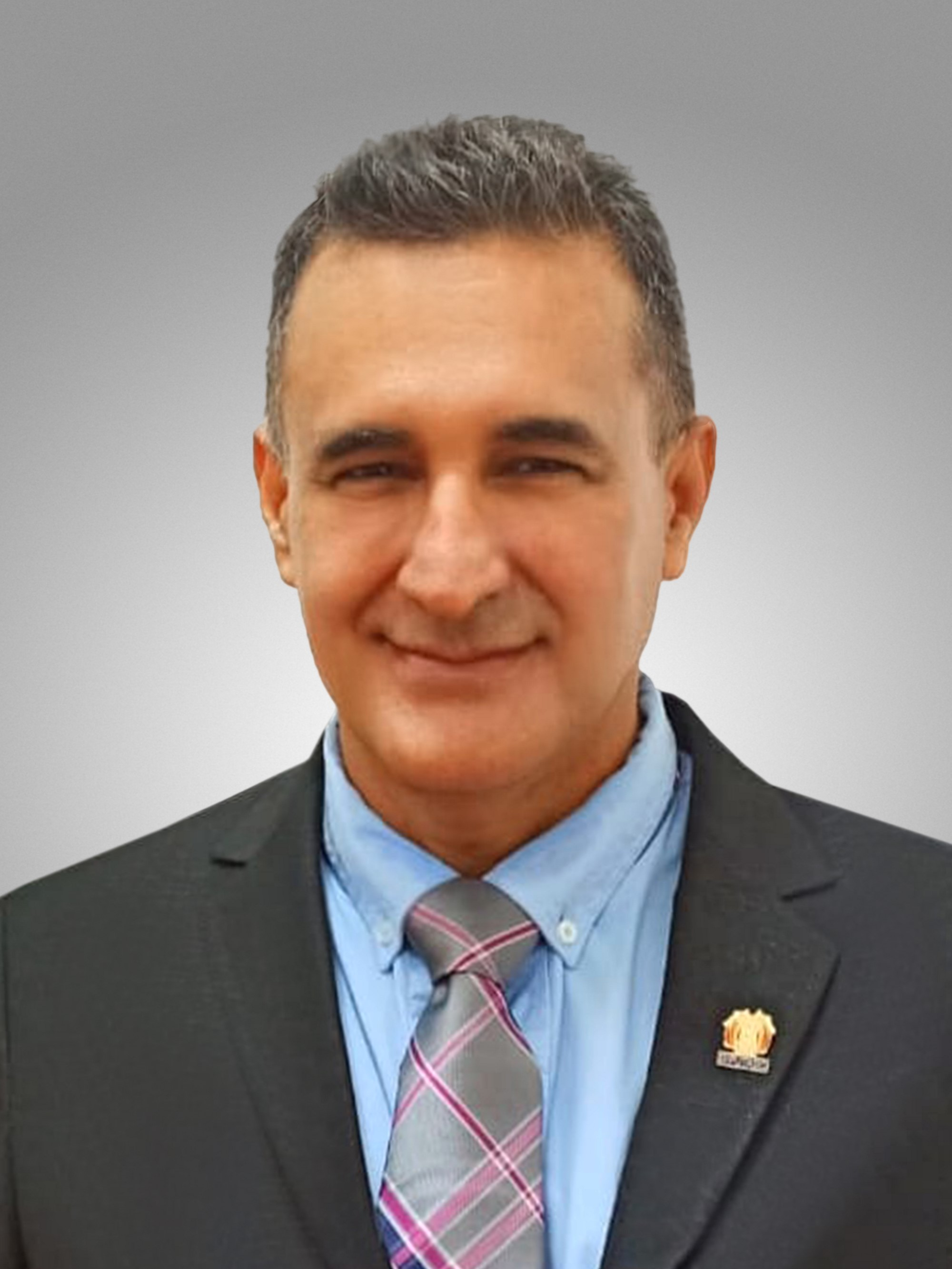
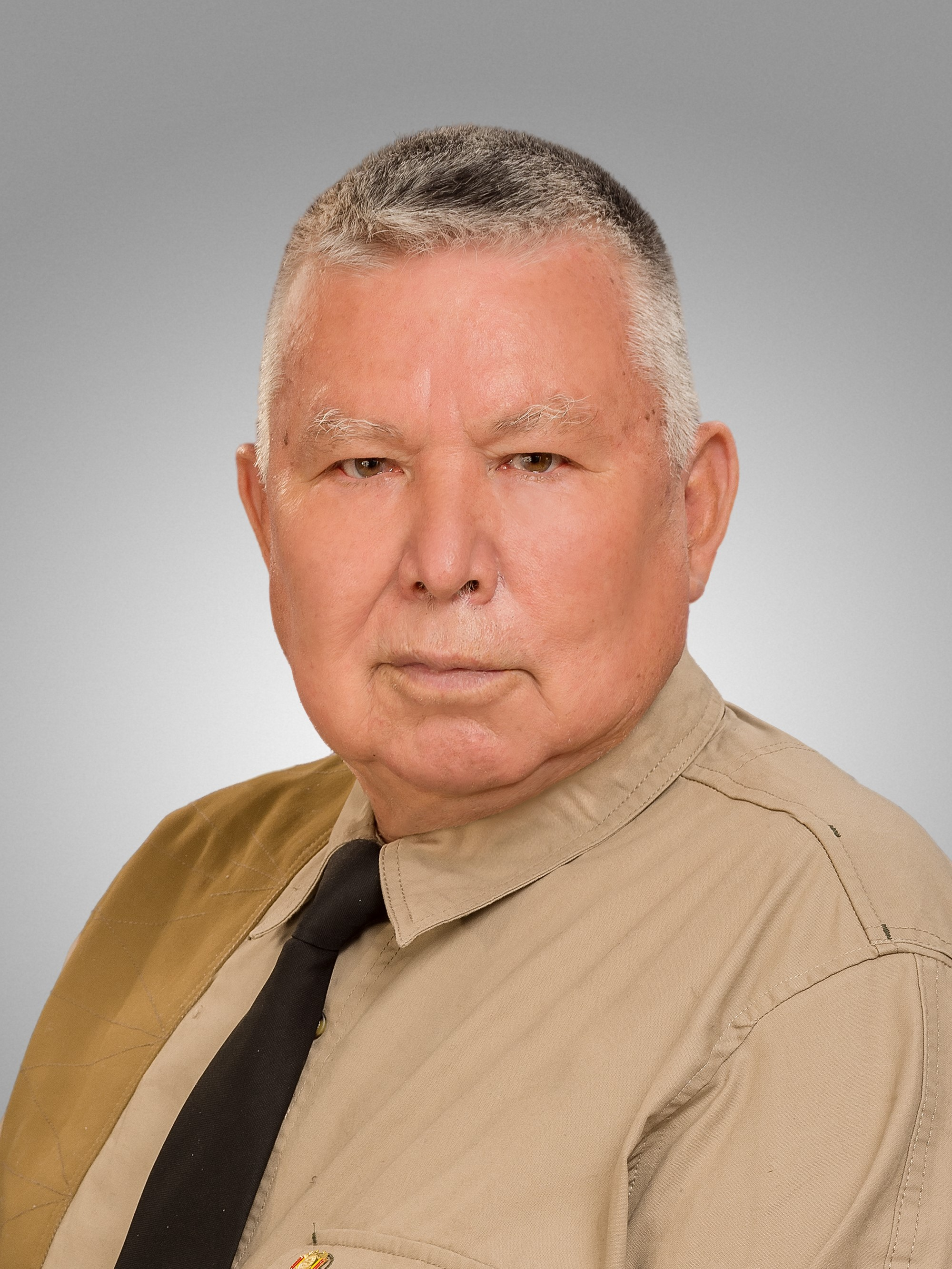
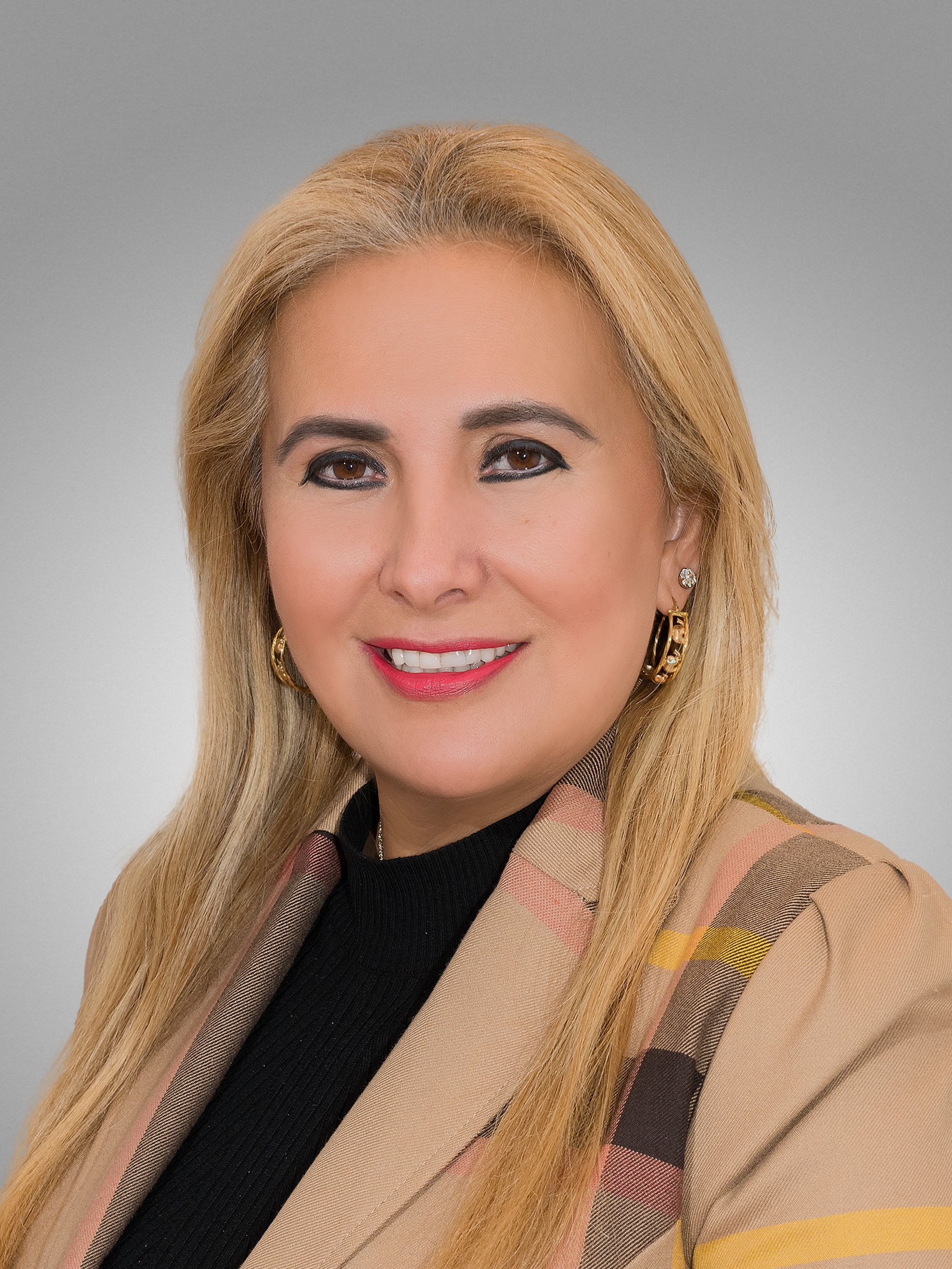
From left to right, top to bottom: Omar Rueda, Runy Callaú, Tito Caero, and Sandra Paz.

While the MAS lay three votes away from reaching two-thirds in the Senate, the daily El Deber noted that swaying that many opposition senators to break ranks would be "almost impossible". However, in the Chamber of Deputies, with its larger pool of possible defectors, the situation was different. Outgoing Deputy Amílcar Barral stated that, while it would be difficult, he "would not be surprised if ... some legislators from Civic Community and Creemos ... betray their parties and go to support the MAS". He pointed out that this had previously occurred with some senators and deputies in the previous two assemblies.

The first instance of such an occurrence came on 28 January 2021, when Edwin Bazán, head of the Creemos caucus in the Chamber of Deputies, announced the alliance's expulsion of four of its deputies—Tito Caero, Runy Callaú, Sandra Paz, and Omar Rueda—for what he described as "moral turpitude". The decision came due to the events of a month prior, in which the four expelled deputies presented Rueda as a nominee to the Ethics Commission against Bazán, who was nominated by the rest of the Creemos caucus. With MAS support, Rueda was elected to the commission, while Bazán was not taken into account. Bazán denounced that, in this way, the MAS achieved a majority on the commission, with three of its own deputies and one dissident to the two of CC, a fact he indicated they would use to intimidate the opposition with sanctions and legal processes. As a result, Bazán announced his alliance's intent to file a lawsuit with the Supreme Electoral Tribunal (TSE) for political transfuge in order to regain the seat. In response, Rueda affirmed that neither he nor his compatriots were allied to the MAS but that they did not hold "favoritism to anyone". He further outlined that his expulsion was not valid because Creemos was not a national political party but, instead, remained a political alliance and, as such, did not have registered members to expel. MAS Deputy Estefanía Morales pointed out that Bazán himself and other Creemos deputies had run in the annulled 2019 elections as members of CC and later joined Creemos for the 2020 election. She went on to characterize the alliance's disagreements as "internal issues that must be resolved in their caucus". On 1 February 2022, the TSE rejected Creemos' complaint.

All of the defecting parliamentarians represent Santa Cruz and are members of Solidarity Civic Unity (UCS), a component party of the Creemos alliance that supported the presidential campaign of Camacho in 2020 and is led by Santa Cruz Mayor Jhonny Fernández. They make up the entire bloc of UCS members that were elected as titular deputies alongside four substitute deputies and one substitute senator—Fernández's daughter, Paola—as representatives of the party. Creemos Deputy José Carlos Gutiérrez of Santa Cruz contended that the strategy of the MAS was to achieve the suspension of four incumbents in order to allow their UCS substitutes to take the seats. On 6 November, one of these substitute deputies, José Luis Durán, also broke with Creemos and joined the ranks of the dissidents. With the departure of five legislators from UCS, criticism was raised against Fernández. In response, the Santa Cruz mayor assured that he has "no alliance with the MAS" but also, with the elections over, "no alliance with Creemos" either. In terms of the disunity in Creemos, he qualified Camacho as wholly responsible as party leader for any disagreements within his organization.

==== Chamber of Deputies Directorate I ====
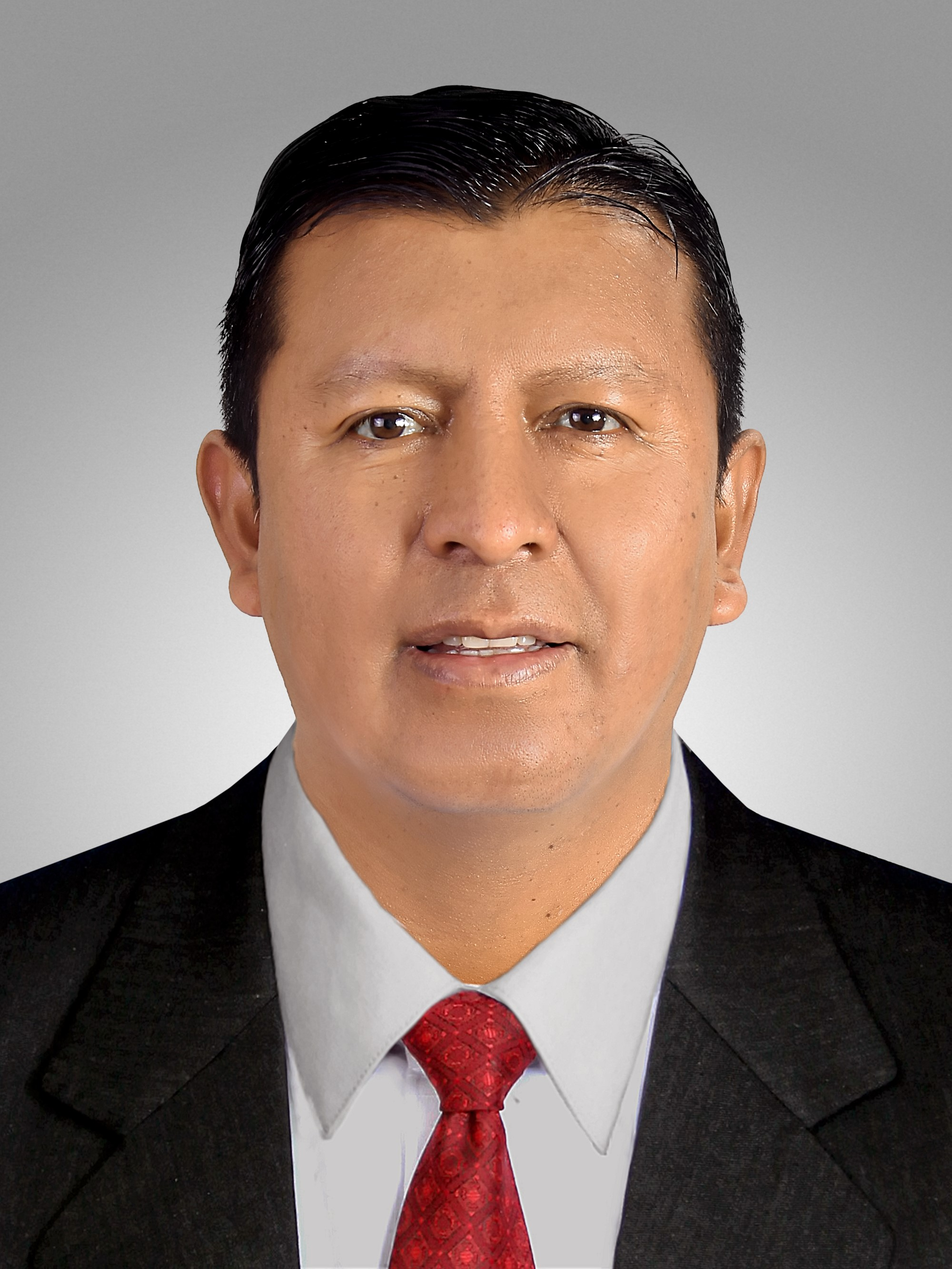
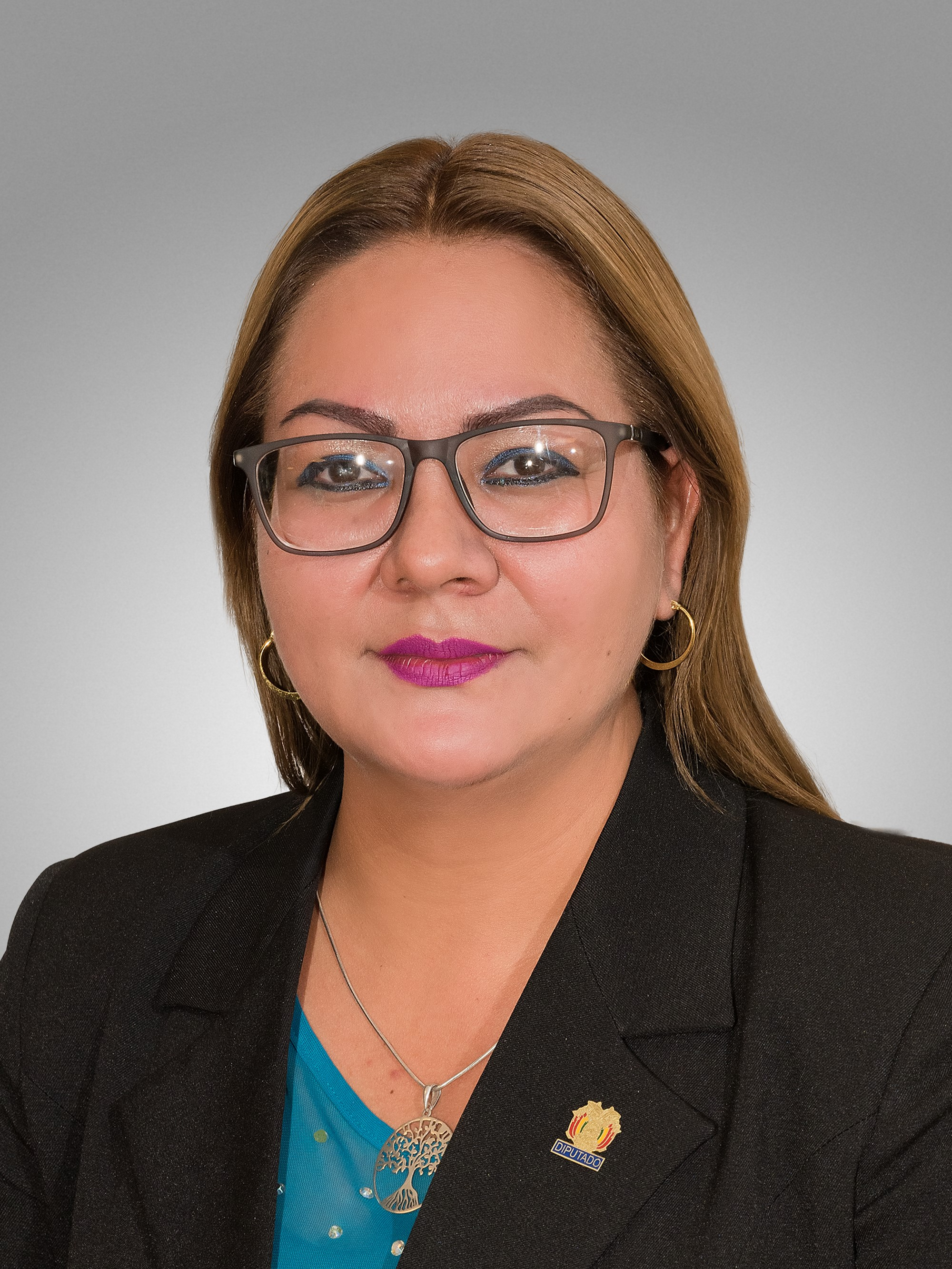
From left to right: Edwin Rosas and Keyla Ortiz.

Tensions over the defection of opposition legislators came to a head in November 2021 on the occasion of the renewal of the Chamber of Deputies' directorate, a body made up of the president, first and second vice presidents, and first through fourth secretaries, of which the second vice presidency and third and fourth secretariats correspond to the opposition as outlined in the chamber's general regulations. On behalf of CC, Carlos Alarcón announced Enrique Urquidi and Walter Villagra, respectively, as their nominees for second vice president and third secretary. However, on 6 November, CC faced an internal crisis when two of its deputies, Edwin Rosas and Keyla Ortiz, declared themselves candidates for these positions. Additionally, the four Creemos dissidents rejected their caucus' nomination of Oscar Michel to the fourth secretariat, instead promoting the continuation of incumbent secretary Sandra Paz in the position. Amid threats and shouts, chamber president Freddy Mamani delayed the vote in order to allow the opposition to reach a consensus.

As the opposition handled its most recent crisis, similar fissures occurred within the MAS caucus, though to a lesser extent. Though Mamani sought a second term as president of the lower house, he failed to attain the nomination of the MAS' La Paz caucus, with Hernán Durán winning the vote by a margin of twenty-five to sixteen. However, Durán's nomination faced pushback from representatives of other departments, with MAS legislators from Beni, Chuquisaca, Pando, and Tarija coalescing around Jerges Mercado, who was nominated by the Santa Cruz caucus. Unlike the opposition, however, the MAS' disagreements remained internal, with Mamani being ratified as a consensus candidate.

While the MAS managed to resolve its disagreements semi-magnanimously, the opposition's disputes continued much more openly, with CC electing to publicly expel both defecting deputies from its ranks. In order to block the election, rescheduled for the morning of 7 November, the opposition held a vigil in the Chamber of Deputies the night prior. To circumvent this, the MAS moved its members to the former Legislative Palace—out of use since the inauguration of a new headquarters in August—and installed the session without the presence of the opposition. Amid protests, Mamani granted the minority parties a twenty-five-minute stay, after which the session began again with their presence. In what Opinión described as "embarrassing" and Los Tiempos called a "scandal", the directive elections were carried out on 7 November. The vote took place amid an atmosphere of screams, insults, pushing, and shoving; at one point, deputies poured water on each other while others tore up their ballots denouncing a "legislative coup". The final result was the reelection of Mamani to the presidency of the Chamber of Deputies, with MAS deputies taking the first vice presidency and first and second secretariats. The dissident Rosas was elected second vice president while Paz continued as fourth secretary. Ortiz was not chosen, with the position of third secretary being granted to Villagra, allowing for one opposition deputy in the chamber's directive. Why the MAS elected to ratify Villagra as third secretary was never clarified.

External videos
- Luis Arce delivers his government report amid shouts and ovations
- Luis Arce da informe de gobierno

With the effective adhesion of two deputies from CC and four from Creemos, the MAS now requires eight parliamentarians to reach two-thirds in the assembly: five deputies and three senators. In view of this, both opposition caucuses assured that the amount of possible "turncoats" within their parties had been exhausted. For Creemos, Deputy Khaline Moreno reported that "we are more united than ever" after the removal of some of its members. Likewise, Luciana Campero, Rosas' substitute, guaranteed that, of the seventy-eight CC deputies and their substitute, the remaining seventy-six had reached full consensus.

According to political analyst Hugo San Martín, the relative ease with which the MAS achieves the defection of opposition parliamentarians stems from the fact that "ideological parties" have become "practically non-existent" since the collapse of the traditional political parties in the early 2000s. San Martín asserts that "opposition parties are generated at the influx of elections", leading to "improvised people, who come to parliament and are free thinkers". Political analyst Gregorio Lanza agreed, stating that the co-option of opposition deputies into the MAS had origins in the "fundamentally electoral" formation of the opposition, established for purposes of running in elections and "not united by ideas and vision of the country". He also pointed to the general issue of corruption in the country as a compounding factor. For CC Deputy Toribia Lero, instances of political transfuge result in the "weakening of the little democracy that remains in the country" by keeping the legislature "submissive and obedient". On the other hand, Vice Minister Jorge Silva—a member of the MAS—argues that the opposition "cannot blame the MAS" because it "is going to make the most advisable political decision" when presented with the opportunity.

The agitation of the deputies following the election carried into the following day when President Arce delivered his management report after one year in office. The majority of his speech was largely drowned out by shouts for and against him by different legislators, with some members of the opposition raising banners and blowing whistles in protest. Shortly after the session, MAS deputy Héctor Arce accused his colleague from Creemos, Tatiana Áñez, of grabbing and scratching his neck when he tried to stop her from moving to the front to interrupt the president. She, in turn, accused him of grabbing her arm and punching her in the stomach.

=== Sessions shutting out opposition ===
==== Military promotions ====
In December 2021, the Senate attempted to address two draft regulations related to the Armed Forces. The first was Chamber Resolution 004/2021–2022, ratifying a series of military promotions issued by President Arce. The second was Chamber Resolution 005/2021–2022, which ratified the promotions of military personnel that occurred in 1989 and 1990 but precluded those issued in 1987 and 1988. Such laws necessitated the support of two-thirds of the legislators present. The opposition refused to approve the regulations, stating that they contained payroll modifications that contravened the Organic Law of the Armed Forces. They asked that the relevant documents be reviewed to ensure that they were in accordance with the list of promotions originally sent to the Senate in 2019. On 21 December, the MAS attempted twice in vain to install a reserved session to approve the list of promotions sent by the executive. In both cases, the ruling party achieved twenty-two votes in favor—the entire MAS caucus plus one unidentified opposition senator—failing to reach the required twenty-four vote majority by just two votes. As a result, the issue was postponed until January of the following year.

Legislative session to elect the Ethics Commission is suspended
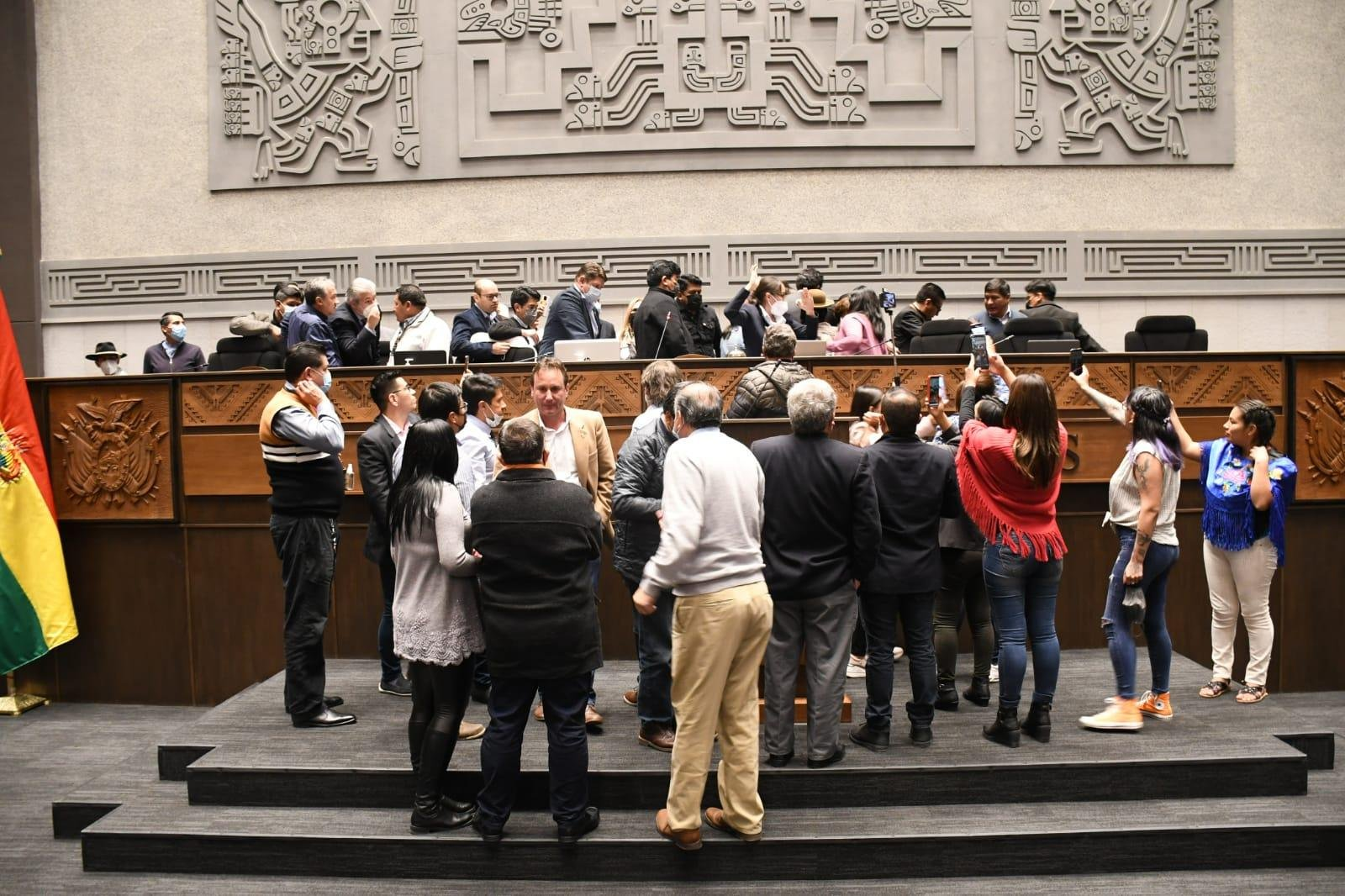
- Deputies enter a scuffle amid protests over the election of members of the commission.
- José Carlos Gutiérrez y Omar Rueda intercambian gritos y desafíos
- Pelea entre Luciana Campero y Gloria Callizaya

The 43rd Regular Session of the Senate was scheduled for 9:00 a.m. on 20 January 2022. On that occasion, four CC senators—Andrea Barrientos, Javier Martínez, Daly Santa María, and Fernando Vaca—ran late for various reasons. Upon arriving, they were informed that in their absence, the MAS had achieved the necessary two-thirds to install a reserved session, and they were thus prohibited from entering the hemicycle. Barrientos decried the session as "forced and illegitimate", pointing out that no part of the Senate Regulations establish that senators may be precluded from entering a reserved session once it has begun. Senator Santa María stated that she and her colleagues had arrived at or around 9:20 a.m. but had nonetheless been locked out of the Senate despite having a half-hour grace period. Given the absence of the four opposition senators, the MAS passed the questioned military promotion regulations with the support of two-thirds of the legislators present. Following the session, President of the Senate Andrónico Rodríguez assured that no irregularities had occurred. He pointed out that one MAS senator had also been excluded from the session for the same reason.

==== Ethics Commission II ====
The following month, a similar situation occurred in the Chamber of Deputies. On 17 February 2022, the chamber installed a session to renew the membership of the Ethics Commission. Though majorities in both CC and Creemos presented their own lists of candidates, dissidents from both blocs presented themselves instead. Of these was Keyla Ortiz, the only opposition dissident who failed to gain a position on the Chamber of Deputies' directorate the previous year. Deputy Carlos Alarcón denounced that for this, the MAS "owed [her] a favor" and that they intended to elect her to the commission, though the ruling party denied that that was the case. Regardless, the session quickly devolved into protests, shouts, and shoves. Among the complainants was Deputy José Carlos Gutiérrez of Creemos. He denounced that in the previous year, most of the twenty-seven complaints sent to the commission were against members of the MAS, but they were all rejected with the support of the dissident Omar Rueda. In contrast, all complaints against opposition deputies were accepted. This accusation provoked a shouting match between Gutiérrez and Rueda, in which the latter challenged Gutiérrez to a brawl: "Let's go outside, let's go outside. I'm going to teach you respect ...". In another instance, Deputy Luciana Campero of CC denounced that her MAS colleague Gloria Callizaya had grabbed her from behind while she was protesting at the front of the hemicycle. The lack of order forced President Mamani to suspend the session for a later date.

The session reconvened on 21 February in a process condemned as "rigged" by the opposition. Alarcón denounced that its installation had been called just fifteen minutes in advance, making it impossible for a large part of the opposition to arrive from their respective departments. In response, Deputy Gualberto Arispe of the MAS noted that the previous session had only been intermediately suspended and could thus have been reinstated "at any moment". The few present opposition legislators boycotted the session in protest, leaving the MAS to approve the conformation of the Ethics Commission. No members of the opposition were selected, with dissidents Ortiz of CC and Caero of Creemos being elected to the commission.

=== Ombudsman election ===
Legislative session to call an election for an ombudsman is suspended
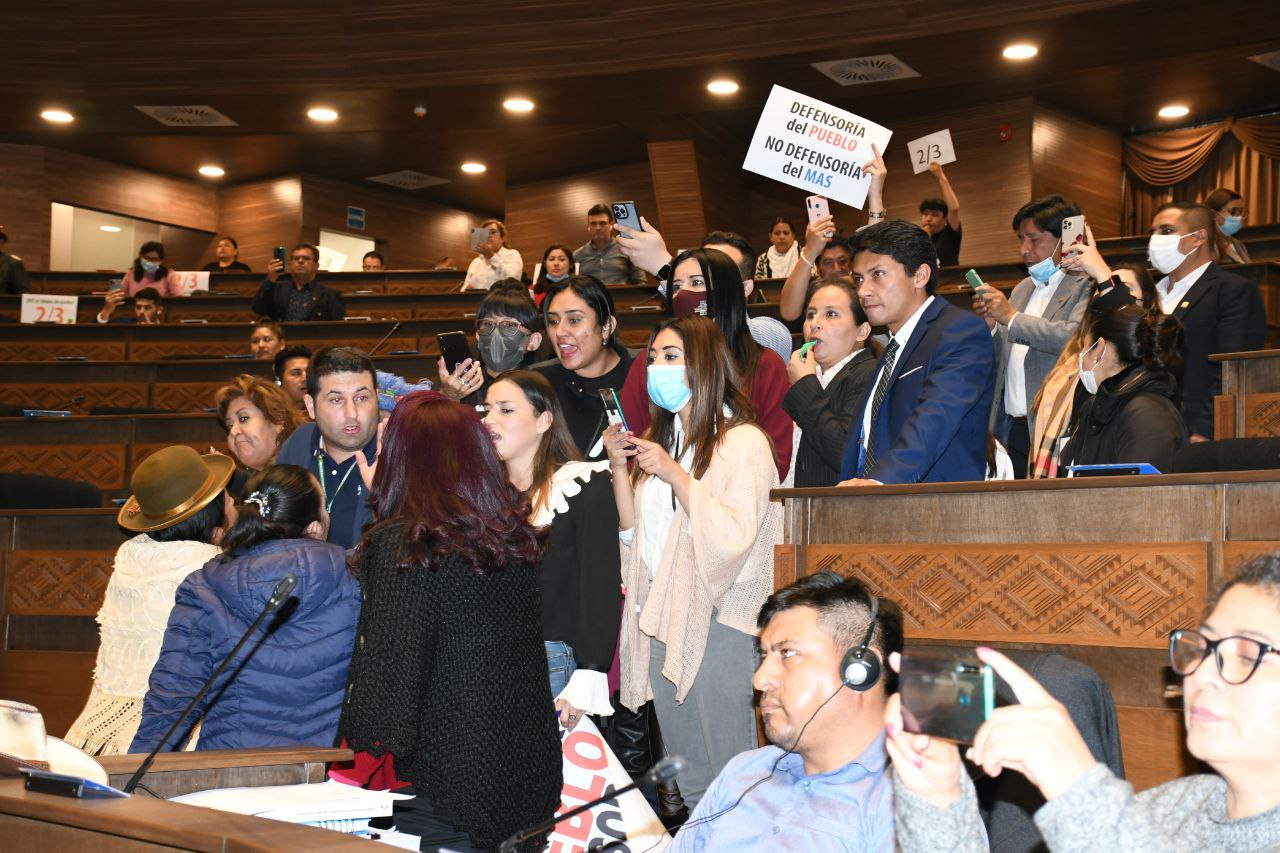
- Legislators of the ruling party and opposition exchange shouts, shoves, and whistles.
- Suspenden sesión legislativa para convocatoria a elección del Defensor

The Constitution delegates the task of appointing a new ombudsman to the Legislative Assembly. Crucially, the selection process necessitates two-thirds support from both chambers of the legislature; that is, the MAS could not elect a new official without opposition support. In January 2019, incumbent ombudsman David Tezanos Pinto resigned, leaving Nadia Cruz as the acting authority, a position that by 2022 she had maintained for more than three years. Cruz's tenure had been criticized by the opposition, who alleged that she carried a partisan bias in favor of the MAS. Since the inauguration of Arce, they had pushed for the legislature to call an election to appoint a new authority.

On 25 February 2022, the MAS presented a draft bill to initiate the selection and appointment process of the ombudsman. In a marathon session on 5 March, the majority-MAS Mixed Commission of the Legislative Constitution approved the regulations to initiate the selection process. Although the MAS took into account some adjustments suggested by the opposition, they were nonetheless criticized for presenting a draft regulation that gave the Mixed Commission complete control over the pre-selection of prospective candidates. Legal analysts agreed that since the MAS controlled the commission, it would only approve MAS-aligned candidates to be presented before the full legislature.

On 9 March, the Senate and Chamber of Deputies installed a legislative session to approve the regulations and issue the call for a new ombudsman. As soon as the session began, CC Senator Silvia Salame of Chuquisaca raised a preliminary motion to establish that the regulation face the approval of two-thirds of the Legislative Assembly. Salame argued that since the Constitution states that the election of the ombudsman requires two-thirds support, necessarily the regulation must also be approved by that amount. Vice President Choquehuanca initially rejected this and asked that the draft bill be read. However, Salame insisted that parliamentary rules dictated that her motion be considered first. To this, Choquehuanca conceded, and he put the motion up for consideration.

The subsequent events were described as "embarrassing" by multiple media outlets. The debate on Salame's motion erupted into general disorder, with shouts and whistles, as well as physical confrontations between legislators. In one incident, Deputy Nogales of CC entered into an argument with Deputy Tania Paniagua of the MAS in which Senator Barrientos of CC also intervened to separate the two, culminating in Nogales being thrown to the ground. Barrientos subsequently made her way to the front of the hemicycle to demand that the vice president suspend the session, but was also met with blows by Paniagua and two other assemblywomen. The quarrel forced Choquehuanca to immediately close the session for the day and summon caucus leaders to impose order over their subordinate parliamentarians.

Together with the vice president, caucus leaders met to discuss a solution to the legislative impasse on 14 March. After some hours of negotiations, leaders from all three caucuses announced that they had reached consensus and would reconvene the legislative session the following day. The amended draft regulation excluded multiple provisions, including those that expanded the power of the Mixed Commission to pre-select candidates. Alarcón of CC and Gutiérrez of Creemos both assured that their caucuses would support the bill. The following day, legislators unanimously passed the bill calling for the election of a new ombudsman.

== Party summary ==
Senate membership

Current (from 3 November 2020)

Chamber of Senators
	Caucus (shading indicates control)			Total	Vac.
	MAS	CC	CRMS	Total	Vac.
3 November 2020	21	11	4	36	0
Latest voting share	58.3%	30.6%	11.1%		

Deputies membership

Current (from 7 November 2021)

Begin (3 November 2020 – 28 January 2021)

28 January 2021 – 29 June 2021

29 June 2021 – 6 October 2021

6 October 2021 – 7 November 2021

Chamber of Deputies
	Caucus (shading indicates control)				Total	Vac.
	MAS	Dis. (Note: Six dissident deputies caucusing with the MAS. Four are from UCS, one is from PG, and one is an independent. The first four were expelled from Creemos and the latter two from CC.)	CC	CRMS	Total	Vac.
3 November 2020	75	0	39	16	130	0
28 January 2021 (Note: In Santa Cruz: Runy Callaú, Tito Caero, Sandra Paz, and Omar Rueda (Creemos-UCS) were expelled from the alliance 28 January 2021.)	75	4	39	12	130	0
29 June 2021 (Note: In Cochabamba circumscription 20: César Virguetti (CC) died 29 June 2021, and his substitute Mayra Zalles (CC) was sworn in 6 October 2021.)	75	4	38	12	129	1
6 October 2021	75	4	39	12	130	0
7 November 2021 (Note: In Beni and Tarija: Keyla Ortiz (CC) and Edwin Rosas (CC-PG) were expelled from the alliance 7 November 2021.)	75	6	37	12	130	0
Latest voting share	62.3%		28.5%	9.2%		

== Leadership ==
The Bolivian Constitution designates the vice president as president of the Plurinational Legislative Assembly. The Constitution also calls for a president of the Chamber of Senators and of the Chamber of Deputies, to serve as the presiding officer over their respective bodies. Each body's general regulations defines a Chamber Directive Board elected each year from among its full members by an absolute majority of those present, respecting gender equity criteria. In the Senate, this directive is composed of a president, first vice president, second vice president, first secretary, second secretary, and third secretary. General regulations assert that the presidency, first vice presidency, and the first and third secretariats correspond to the majority bloc; and the second vice presidency and second secretariat correspond to the minority bloc. In the Chamber of Deputies, the directive is composed of a president, first vice president, second vice president, first secretary, second secretary, third secretary, and fourth secretary. General regulations assert that the presidency, first vice presidency, and the first and second secretariats correspond to the majority bloc; and the second vice presidency and the third and fourth secretariats correspond to the minority bloc.

Assembly President

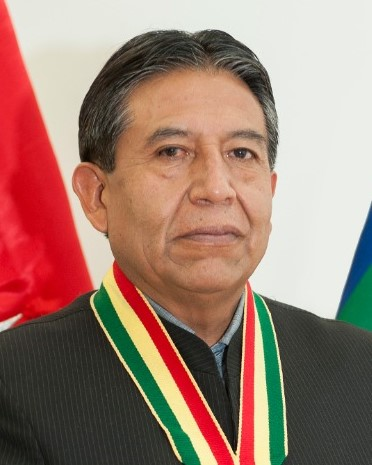
David Choquehuanca (MAS-IPSP)

Senate President

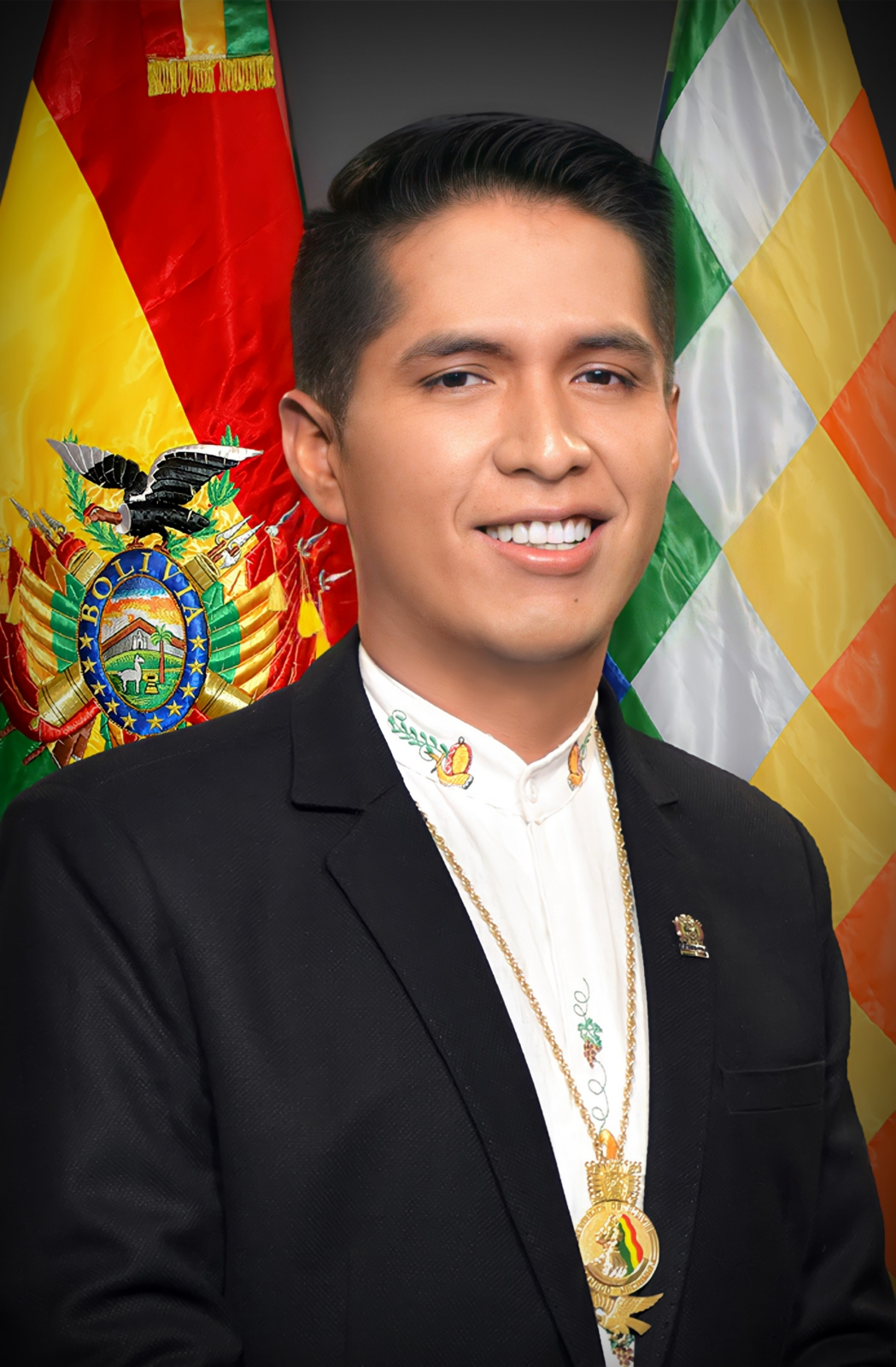
Andrónico Rodríguez (MAS-IPSP)

Deputies President

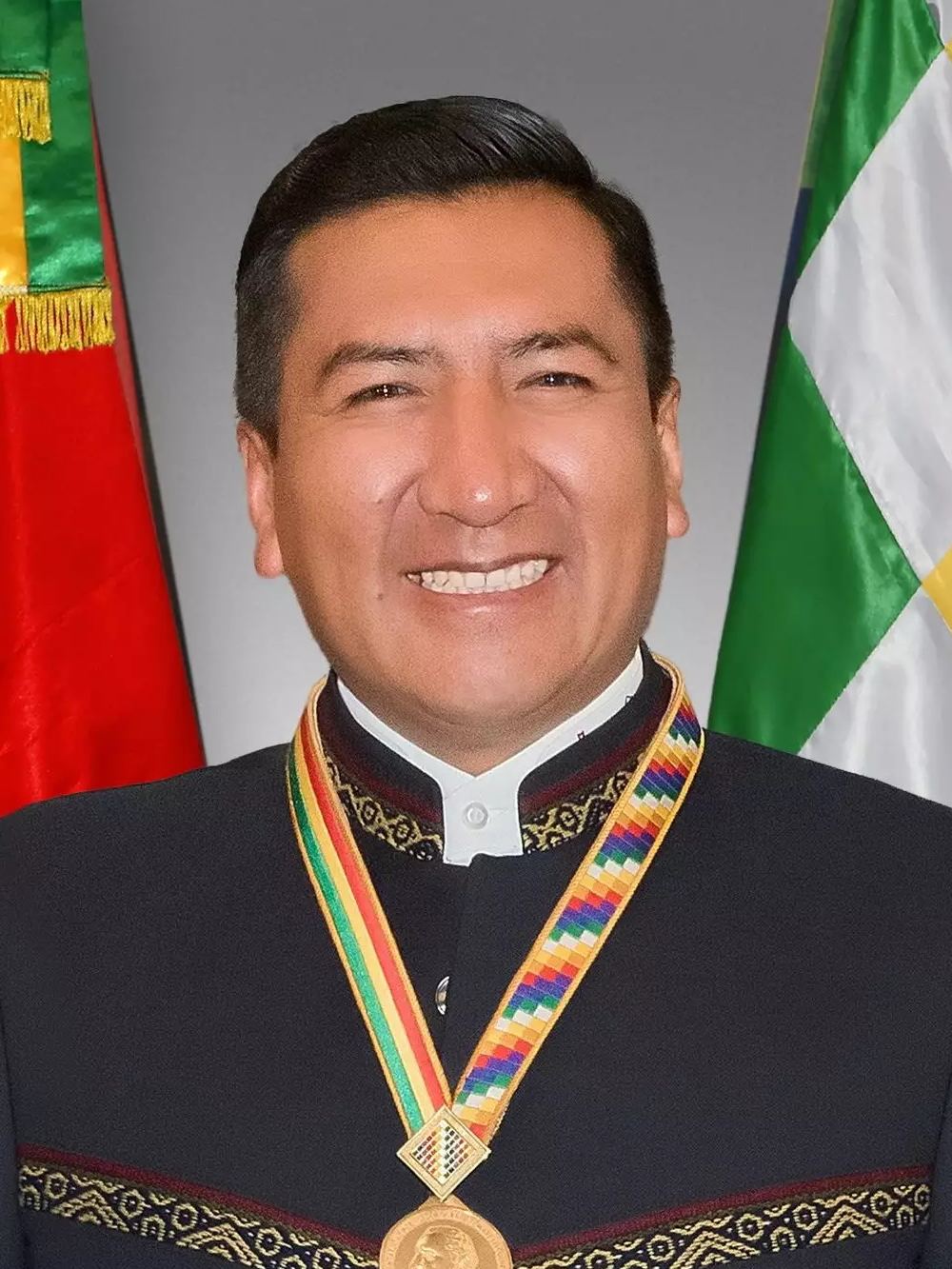
Freddy Mamani (MAS-IPSP)

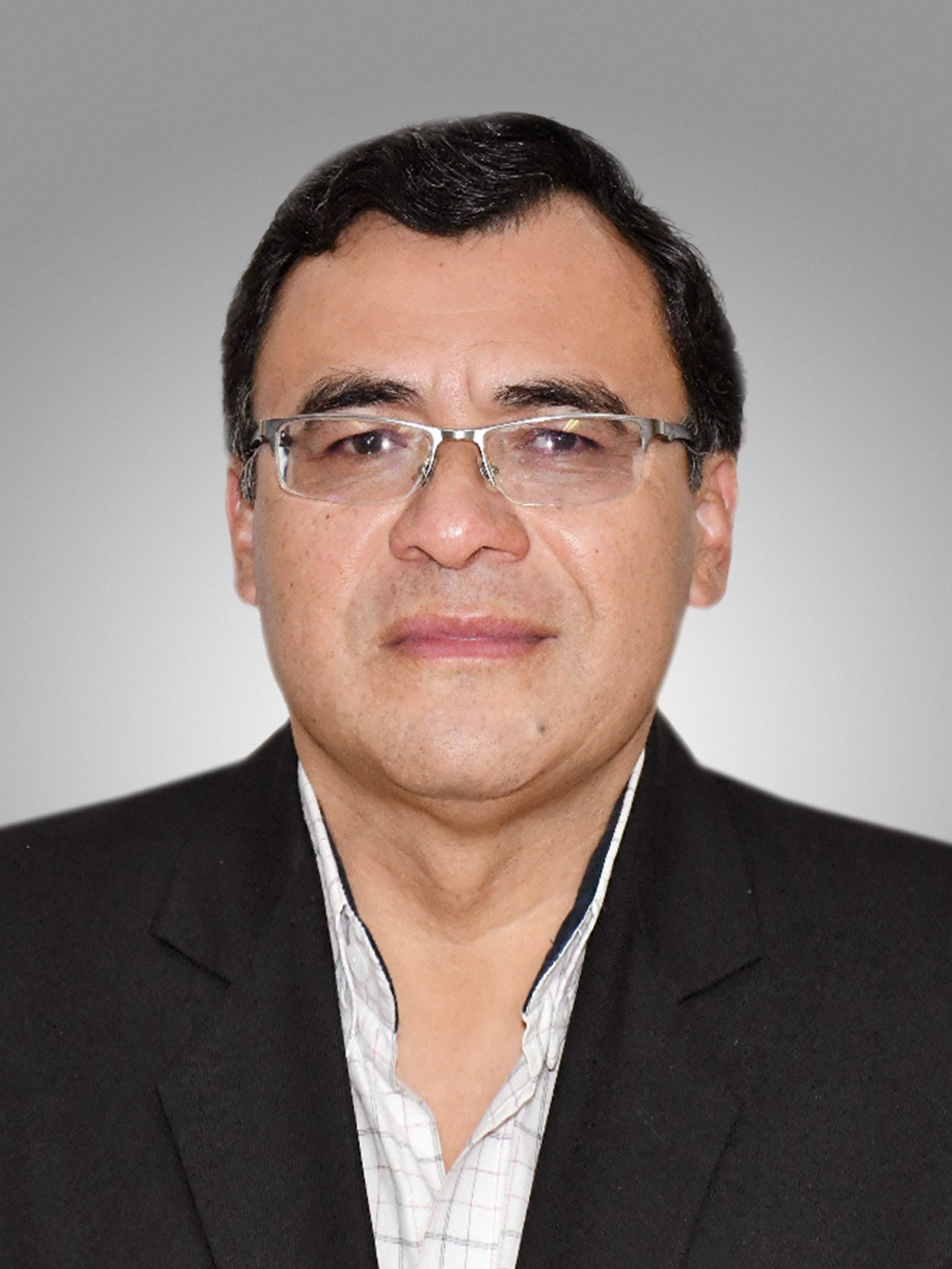
Jerges Mercado Suárez (MAS-IPSP)

Plurinational Legislative Assembly
Portfolio	Vice President	Party	Dep.	Term		Ref.
Portfolio	Vice President	Party	Dep.	Took office	Left office	Ref.
President	David Choquehuanca	MAS	LPZ	8 November 2020	Incumbent	
Chamber of Senators
Portfolio	Senator	Caucus	Dep.	Term		Ref.
Portfolio	Senator	Caucus	Dep.	Took office	Left office	Ref.
President	Andrónico Rodríguez	MAS	CBB	4 November 2020	Incumbent	
First Vice President	Lindaura Rasguido	MAS	ORU	4 November 2020	4 November 2021	
First Vice President	Simona Quispe Apaza	MAS	LPZ	4 November 2021	3 November 2022	
First Vice President	Gladys Alarcón	MAS	TRJ	3 November 2022	Incumbent	
Second Vice President	Rodrigo Paz Pereira	CC	TRJ	4 November 2020	4 November 2021	
Second Vice President	Santiago Ticona	CC	CHQ	4 November 2021	3 November 2022	
Second Vice President	Vania Rocha	CC	ORU	3 November 2022	Incumbent	
First Secretary	Gladys Alarcón	MAS	TRJ	4 November 2020	4 November 2021	
First Secretary	Pedro Benjamín Vargas	MAS	PTS	4 November 2021	3 November 2022	
First Secretary	Roberto Padilla	MAS	CHQ	3 November 2022	Incumbent	
Second Secretary	Centa Rek	CRMS	SCZ	4 November 2020	4 November 2021	
Second Secretary	Julio Romaña	CRMS	PND	4 November 2021	3 November 2022	
Second Secretary	Claudia Égüez	CRMS	BNI	3 November 2022	Incumbent	
Third Secretary	Suka Nacif	MAS	BNI	4 November 2020	4 November 2021	
Third Secretary	Miguel Rejas	MAS	TRJ	4 November 2021	3 November 2022	
Third Secretary	Isidoro Quispe	MAS	SCZ	3 November 2022	Incumbent	
Chamber of Deputies
Portfolio	Senator	Caucus	Dep.	Term		Ref.
Portfolio	Senator	Caucus	Dep.	Took office	Left office	Ref.
President	Freddy Mamani	MAS	LPZ	3 November 2020	4 November 2022	
President	Jerges Mercado Suárez	MAS	SCZ	4 November 2022	3 November 2023	
President	Israel Huaytari Martínez	MAS	POT	3 November 2023	29 October 2024	
President	Omar Yujra	MAS	LPZ	29 October 2024	Incumbent	
First Vice President	Elsa Alí	MAS	PTS	3 November 2020	7 November 2021	
First Vice President	Miriam Martínez	MAS	ORU	7 November 2021	4 November 2022	
First Vice President	Hernán Durán	MAS	LPZ	4 November 2022	Incumbent	
Second Vice President	Gustavo Adolfo Aliaga Palma	CC	LPZ	3 November 2020	7 November 2021	
Second Vice President	Edwin Rosas (Note: Dissident of the opposition caucusing with the MAS.)	CC	TRJ	7 November 2021	4 November 2022	
Second Vice President	Ingvar Ellefsen	CC	LPZ	4 November 2022	Incumbent	
First Secretary	Patricio Mendoza	MAS	SCZ	3 November 2020	7 November 2021	
First Secretary	Alexsandra Zenteno	MAS	TRJ	7 November 2021	4 November 2022	
First Secretary	María José Rodríguez	MAS	PND	4 November 2022	Incumbent	
Second Secretary	Jorge Yucra	MAS	CHQ	3 November 2020	7 November 2021	
Second Secretary	Enrique Cunai	MAS	BNI	7 November 2021	4 November 2022	
Second Secretary	Jorge Yucra	MAS	CHQ	4 November 2022	Incumbent	
Third Secretary	Walter Villagra	CC	LPZ	3 November 2020	4 November 2022	
Third Secretary	José Maldonado	CC	CBB	4 November 2022	Incumbent	
Fourth Secretary	Sandra Paz	CRMS	SCZ	3 November 2020	4 November 2022	
Fourth Secretary	Sergio Maniguary	CRMS	PND	4 November 2022	Incumbent	

== Composition ==
=== Senate ===
All thirty-six seats and thirty-six substitutes were filled by election in October 2020. This legislative term marks the first time in Bolivian history in which women make up a majority of the Senate's composition. Of the thirty-six seats, twenty correspond to women, that is, 55.5 percent of the chamber. In individual party caucuses, women make up ten of the twenty-one MAS senators (47.6 percent), eight of the eleven from CC (72.7 percent), and two of the four from Creemos (fifty percent). This result is due to the fact that the three political organizations that achieved Senate representation predominantly placed women at the top of their electoral lists.

Thirty-four titular senators were sworn in on 3 November 2020, with the remaining two, Hilarión Mamani and Pedro Benjamín Vargas, being sworn in the following day. All but one of the thirty-six substitute senators were sworn in six days later on 9 November. Zvonko Matkovic did not arrive to take the oath until 19 November.

Current Chamber of Senators composition by department

Department	Titular Senator	Caucus	Substitute Senator	Ref.
Chuquisaca	Roberto Padilla	Movement for Socialism	Laura Parraga	
Chuquisaca	Trinidad Rocha	Movement for Socialism	Germán Moscoso	
Chuquisaca	Silvia Salame	Civic; Community	Jorge Antonio; Zamora	
Chuquisaca	Santiago Ticona	Civic; Community	Sarai Reinaga	
La Paz	Virginia Velasco	Movement for Socialism	Hilarión Padilla (Note: In La Paz: Substitute Senator Hilarión Padilla was arrested in Caracollo on charges of rape on 10 February 2022, and the Senate issued him temporary leave without pay on 16 February 2022.)	
La Paz	Felix Ajpi	Movement for Socialism	Yolanda Ponce	
La Paz	Simona Quispe	Movement for Socialism	Guido Varela	
La Paz	Cecilia Requena	Civic; Community	Porfirio Menacho	
Cochabamba	Leonardo Loza	Movement for Socialism	Lucy Escobar	
Cochabamba	Patricia Arce	Movement for Socialism	Hermo Perez	
Cochabamba	Andrónico; Rodriguez	Movement for Socialism	Dilma Cabrera	
Cochabamba	Andrea; Barrientos	Civic; Community	Guillermo Seoane	
Oruro	Miguel Pérez	Movement for Socialism	Mery Choque	
Oruro	Lindaura; Rasguido	Movement for Socialism	Gilmar Huarachi	
Oruro	Rubén Gutiérrez	Movement for Socialism	Laura Lujan	
Oruro	Vania Rocha	Civic; Community	Fernando Dehne	
Potosí	Hilarión Mamani	Movement for Socialism	Elena Aguilar	
Potosí	Ana María; Castillo	Movement for Socialism	Santos Ramos	
Potosí	Pedro Benjamín; Vargas	Movement for Socialism	Hilda Vega	
Potosí	Daly Santa María	Civic; Community	Pedro Lagrava	
Tarija	Rodrigo Paz; Pereira	Civic; Community	Zoya Zamora	
Tarija	Nely Gallo	Civic; Community	Javier Martínez	
Tarija	Gladys Alarcón	Movement for Socialism	Luis Casso	
Tarija	Miguel Rejas	Movement for Socialism	Natividad Aramayo	
Santa Cruz	Centa Rek	Creemos	Erik Morón (Note: In Santa Cruz: Zvonko Matkovic (Creemos) resigned on 21 January 2021 to qualify as a candidate for departmental assembly member of Santa Cruz. Erik Morón (Creemos) was appointed to complete the unexpired term and began serving 28 April 2021.)	
Santa Cruz	Henry Montero	Creemos	Paola Fernández	
Santa Cruz	Soledad Flores	Movement for Socialism	William Torrez	
Santa Cruz	Isidoro Quispe	Movement for Socialism	María Muñoz	
Beni	Cecilia Moyoviri	Civic; Community	Fernando Vaca	
Beni	Walter Justiniano	Civic; Community	Neila Velarde	
Beni	Roxana "Suka" Nacif	Movement for Socialism	Misdrael Mamani	
Beni	Claudia Égüez	Creemos	Javier; Villavicencio	
Pando	Eva Humérez	Movement for Socialism	Ermenegildo; Llavera	
Pando	Luis Adolfo; Flores	Movement for Socialism	Paula Paxi	
Pando	Julio Romaña	Creemos	Dulce María Araujo	
Pando	Corina Ferreira	Civic; Community	Walter Buitrago	
Department	Titular Senator	Caucus	Substitute Senator	Ref.

=== Chamber of Deputies ===
All 130 seats as well as 129 substitutes were filled by election in October 2020. The titular deputies were sworn in on 3 November 2020 and their substitutes took office two days later on 5 November.

Current Chamber of Deputies composition by circumscription (left) and party list (right).

Constituency	Titular Deputy	Caucus	Substitute Deputy	Ref.
List-Chuquisaca	Blanca López	Movement for Socialism	Gustavo Cuellar	
List-Chuquisaca	Gustavo Vega	Movement for Socialism	Yharsina Rengifo	
List-Chuquisaca	Pamela Alurralde	Civic; Community	Marcelo Solis	
List-Chuquisaca	Marcelo Pedrazas	Civic; Community	Linda Vega	
List-Chuquisaca	Marlene Fernández	Civic; Community	Yver Padilla	
1-Chuquisaca	Pablo Arízaga	Civic; Community	Delia Arancibia	
2-Chuquisaca	Lily Fernández	Civic; Community	Fernando Morales	
3-Chuquisaca	Jorge Yucra	Movement for Socialism	Josefina Maturano	
4-Chuquisaca	Lidia Limón	Movement for Socialism	Yamil Flores	
5-Chuquisaca	Adán Palacios	Movement for Socialism	Crecencia Saldaña	
List-La Paz	Freddy Mamani	Movement for Socialism	Persida Guaygua	
List-La Paz	Bertha Acarapi	Movement for Socialism	Juanito Angulo	
List-La Paz	Freddy López	Movement for Socialism	Virginia Alanoca	
List-La Paz	Betty Yañiquez	Movement for Socialism	Idelfonso Canaza	
List-La Paz	Froilán Mamani	Movement for Socialism	Nely Nesta	
List-La Paz	Gloria Callizaya	Movement for Socialism	Oscar Guisbely	
List-La Paz	Freddy Velásquez	Movement for Socialism	Olimpia Alejo	
List-La Paz	Soledad Pérez	Movement for Socialism	Richard Muchia	
List-La Paz	Omar Yujra	Movement for Socialism	Maribela; Vilela Lipa	
List-La Paz	Carlos Alarcón	Civic; Community	Krupskaya Oña	
List-La Paz	Elena Pachacute	Civic; Community	José Manuel; Ormachea	
List-La Paz	Walter Villagra	Civic; Community	Roxana Vidales	
List-La Paz	Gabriela Ferrel	Civic; Community	Alejandro Reyes	
List-La Paz	Gustavo Aliaga	Civic; Community	Jhenny Condori	
6-La Paz	Beto Astorga	Civic; Community	Rosario Torrez	
7-La Paz	Miguel Roca	Civic; Community	Elizabeth Mamani	
8-La Paz	Ingvar Ellefsen	Civic; Community	María Elena; Reque	
9-La Paz	Ramiro Venegas	Movement for Socialism	Ana María; Mendoza	
10-La Paz	María Alanoca	Movement for Socialism	Zacarías Laura	
11-La Paz	Renán Cabezas	Movement for Socialism	Amanda Iriarte	
12-La Paz	Sabina Hilda; Condori	Movement for Socialism	Sandro Ramírez	
13-La Paz	Félix Mayta	Movement for Socialism	Juana Mamani	
14-La Paz	Hernán Durán	Movement for Socialism	Martha Ramos	
15-La Paz	Zulay Mamani	Movement for Socialism	Juan David; Vargas	
16-La Paz	Andrés Flores	Movement for Socialism	Celia Quispe	
17-La Paz	Gladys Quispe	Movement for Socialism	Lino Sillo	
18-La Paz	Basilia Rojas	Movement for Socialism	Lucho Quispe	
19-La Paz	Pasceza Quispe	Movement for Socialism	José Rengel	
Special-La Paz	Verónica Challco	Movement for Socialism	Johnson Jiménez	
List-Cochabamba	Magaly Gómez	Movement for Socialism	Bernardo "Berno" Poca	
List-Cochabamba	José Luis; Flores	Movement for Socialism	Pamela Terrazas	
List-Cochabamba	Felicia Alejo	Movement for Socialism	Cecilio Alanes	
List-Cochabamba	Jhonny Pardo	Movement for Socialism	Eva Salazar	
List-Cochabamba	Toribia Lero	Civic; Community	George Komadina	
List-Cochabamba	Saúl Lara	Civic; Community	Ana María; Saavedra	
List-Cochabamba	Samantha Nogales	Civic; Community	Jorge Pinto	
List-Cochabamba	José Maldonado	Civic; Community	Claudia Torrez	
List-Cochabamba	Alejandra Camargo	Civic; Community	Rory Ordoñez	
20-Cochabamba	Mayra Zalles	Civic; Community	None	
21-Cochabamba	Santos Mamani	Movement for Socialism	Cintia Castro	
22-Cochabamba	Olivia Guachalla	Movement for Socialism	Damián Laime	
23-Cochabamba	Lizeth Morales	Movement for Socialism	Grobert Nogales	
24-Cochabamba	Gualberto Arispe	Movement for Socialism	Celida Condori	
25-Cochabamba	Héctor Arce	Movement for Socialism	María Lizbeth; Vargas	
26-Cochabamba	María Cristina; Choque	Movement for Socialism	Juan Zurita	
27-Cochabamba	Rosario García	Movement for Socialism	Vicente Condori	
28-Cochabamba	Pacífico Choque	Movement for Socialism	Overlinda Camacho	
Special-Cochabamba	Gildo Hinojosa	Movement for Socialism	Faviola; Guaguasú	
List-Oruro	Lily Bernabé	Movement for Socialism	Elías Choque	
List-Oruro	Enrique Urquidi	Civic; Community	Lucía Condori	
List-Oruro	Mariel Peñaloza	Civic; Community	Orlando Valdez	
List-Oruro	Ronald Huanca	Civic; Community	Tania Cayoja	
29-Oruro	Miriam Martínez	Movement for Socialism	Román Mollo	
30-Oruro	Juan José; Jauregui	Movement for Socialism	Madain Paco	
31-Oruro	Celia Salazar	Movement for Socialism	Omar Sánchez	
32-Oruro	Quintín Villazón	Movement for Socialism	Jhenny Choquilla	
Special-Oruro	Honorio Chino	Movement for Socialism	María Choque	
List-Potosí	Elsa Alí	Movement for Socialism	Abelardo Colque	
List-Potosí	Antonio Colque	Movement for Socialism	Teodocia Benavidez	
List-Potosí	Celia Rivera	Movement for Socialism	Ismael Liquitaya	
List-Potosí	Guillermo; Benavides	Civic; Community	Lissa Claros	
List-Potosí	Marina Morales	Civic; Community	Gonzalo Borjes	
List-Potosí	Juan Pardo	Civic; Community	Verónica Sanjinés	
33-Potosí	Juan José; Torrez	Civic; Community	Mery Mamani	
34-Potosí	Mónica Torres	Civic; Community	Ernesto; Cárdenas	
35-Potosí	Pedro Francisco; Coro	Movement for Socialism	Cipriana Guerrero	
36-Potosí	Adriana Tarifa	Movement for Socialism	Dionicio Quispe	
37-Potosí	Higinio Farfán	Movement for Socialism	Abad Farfán	
38-Potosí	Gladys; Chumacero	Movement for Socialism	Luis Yapura	
39-Potosí	Israel Huaytari	Movement for Socialism	Casilda Cuellar	
List-Tarija	María Elena; Ortega	Civic; Community	Adrián Vega	
List-Tarija	José Luis; Porcel	Civic; Community	Esther Sánchez	
List-Tarija	José Huanca	Movement for Socialism	Viviana Aparicio	
List-Tarija	Alexsandra; Zenteno	Movement for Socialism	Bryan Zalles	
40-Tarija	Edwin Rosas (Note: Rosas belongs to First the People, the civic group of Senator Rodrigo Paz Pereira. It is unclear if his membership in PG was also revoked upon his expulsion from CC, though Paz, as leader of the party, condemned Rosas for political transfuge.)	Independent	Luciana Campero	
41-Tarija	Mariela Baldivieso	Civic; Community	Herlan Aldana	
42-Tarija	Delfor Burgos	Movement for Socialism	Mariela Quispe	
43-Tarija	Lidia Tupa	Movement for Socialism	Eloy Maraz	
Special-Tarija	Darlen Velasco	Movement for Socialism	Josué Ayala	
List-Santa Cruz	Marioly Morón	Creemos	Caleb Villarroel	
List-Santa Cruz	Erwin Bazán	Creemos	Laura Rojas	
List-Santa Cruz	Khaline Moreno	Creemos	Richard Ribera	
List-Santa Cruz	Tito Caero	Solidarity; Civic Unity	Fabiola Guachalla	
List-Santa Cruz	Sandra Paz	Solidarity; Civic Unity	Andrés Romero	
List-Santa Cruz	Estefanía Morales	Movement for Socialism	Rolando Cuellar (Note: In Santa Cruz: Rolando Cuellar (MAS-IPSP) was expelled from the party 16 March 2022.)	
List-Santa Cruz	Jerges Mercado Suárez	Movement for Socialism	Cinda Luana; Nolasco	
List-Santa Cruz	Alina Canaviri	Movement for Socialism	Valuis Sequeli	
List-Santa Cruz	Anyelo Céspedes	Movement for Socialism	Ninoska Morales	
List-Santa Cruz	Luisa Nayar	Civic; Community	Jairo Guiteras	
List-Santa Cruz	Daniel Prieto	Civic; Community	María José; Salazar	
List-Santa Cruz	Senaida Rojas	Civic; Community	Iván Canaviri	
List-Santa Cruz	Aldo Terrazas	Civic; Community	Solimar Veizaga	
44-Santa Cruz	Walthy Egüez	Creemos	Jenniffer Torrico	
45-Santa Cruz	José Carlos; Gutiérrez	Creemos	Ericka Chávez	
46-Santa Cruz	Moira Osinaga	Creemos	José Luis; Durán (Note: Creemos-Solidarity Civic Unity.)	
47-Santa Cruz	Tatiana Áñez	Creemos	Henry Gutiérrez	
48-Santa Cruz	Omar Rueda	Solidarity; Civic Unity	Haidy Muñoz	
49-Santa Cruz	Patricio Mendoza	Movement for Socialism	Amalia Sarabia	
50-Santa Cruz	Oscar Michel	Creemos	Roxana Álvarez	
51-Santa Cruz	Runy Callaú	Solidarity; Civic Unity	Verónica Aguilera	
52-Santa Cruz	Deisy Choque	Movement for Socialism	Samuel Mamani	
53-Santa Cruz	Tania Paniagua	Movement for Socialism	José Nogales	
54-Santa Cruz	María René; Álvarez	Creemos	Jorge "Chichi"; Saucedo	
55-Santa Cruz	Hernán Hinojosa	Movement for Socialism	María Goreti; Jaldín	
56-Santa Cruz	Vicente Condori	Movement for Socialism	María Daniela; Arispe	
57-Santa Cruz	Danny Daniel; Rojas	Movement for Socialism	Faustina Coa	
Special-Santa Cruz	Elsa Sánchez	Movement for Socialism	Luis Alfonso; Changaray	
List-Beni	Janira Román	Civic; Community	Genghis Justiniano	
List-Beni	Oscar Balderas	Civic; Community	Prisila Dantes	
List-Beni	Sarah Crespo	Movement for Socialism	Roque Mapaquine	
58-Beni	Fernando Llapiz	Creemos	Mariel Marín	
59-Beni	Aleida Joseff	Movement for Socialism	Santos Cori	
60-Beni	Keyla Ortiz	Independent	Herbert Taboada	
61-Beni	Leonardo Ayala	Creemos	None (Note: No substitute deputy for this circumscription was presented on Creemos' list of qualified candidates.)	
Special-Beni	Enrique Cunai	Movement for Socialism	Fátima Achipa	
List-Pando	Sergio Maniguary	Creemos	Deisy Maita	
List-Pando	Sebastian Divico	Civic; Community	Raquel Rodríguez	
62-Pando	María José; Rodríguez	Movement for Socialism	Kemer Quiroga	
63-Pando	Roy Suárez	Movement for Socialism	Ariana Gonzales	
Special-Pando	Tacni Mendoza	Movement for Socialism	Javier Machuqui	
Constituency	Titular Deputy	Caucus	Substitute Deputy	Ref.

== See also ==
- 2020 Bolivian general election (elections leading to this Assembly)
- 2025 Bolivian general election (elections during this Assembly, leading to the next Assembly)
