= Roberto Castro Salazar =

Bolivian businessman, architect, and politician

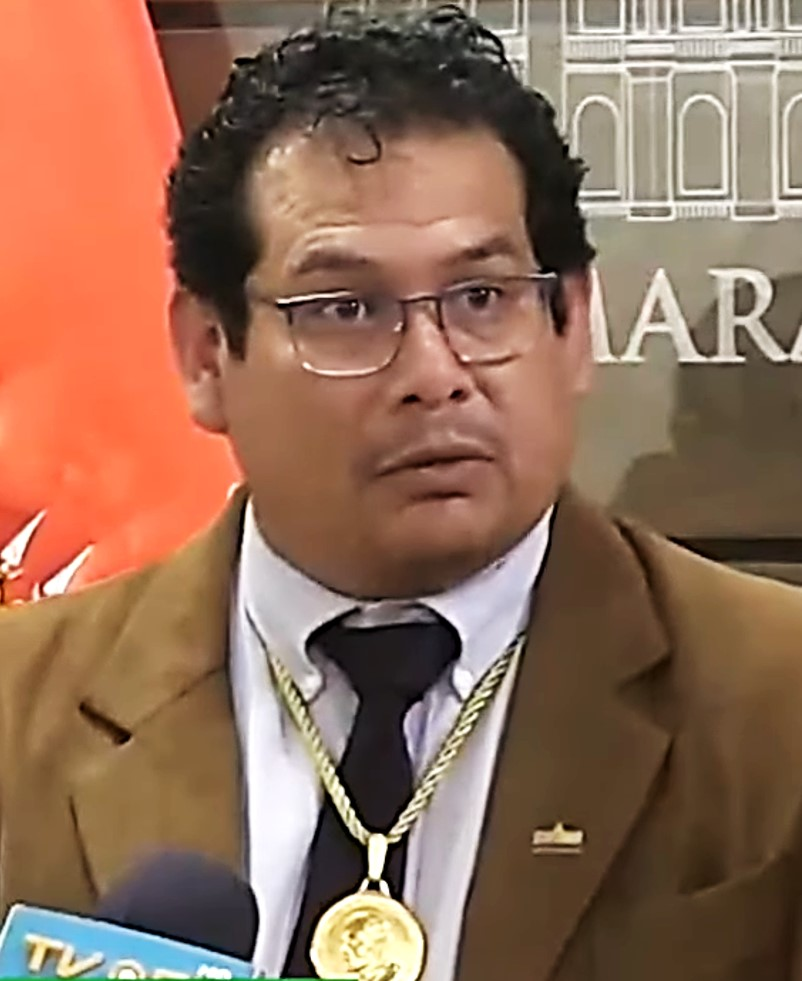

President of the Chamber of Deputies
- Incumbent
- Assumed office 6 November 2025
- Preceded by: Omar Yujra

Member of the Chamber of Deputies
- Incumbent
- Assumed office 6 November 2025

Personal details
- Born: 3 September 1980 (age 46) Chuquisaca
- Party: Christian Democratic Party
- Education: University of San Francisco Xavier
- Occupation: Politician,architect

Roberto Castro Salazar is a Bolivian businessman, architect, and politician who has been serving as the President of the Chamber of Deputies of Bolivia since November 6, 2025.
