= Freddy Mamani =

Bolivian educator and politician (born 1974)

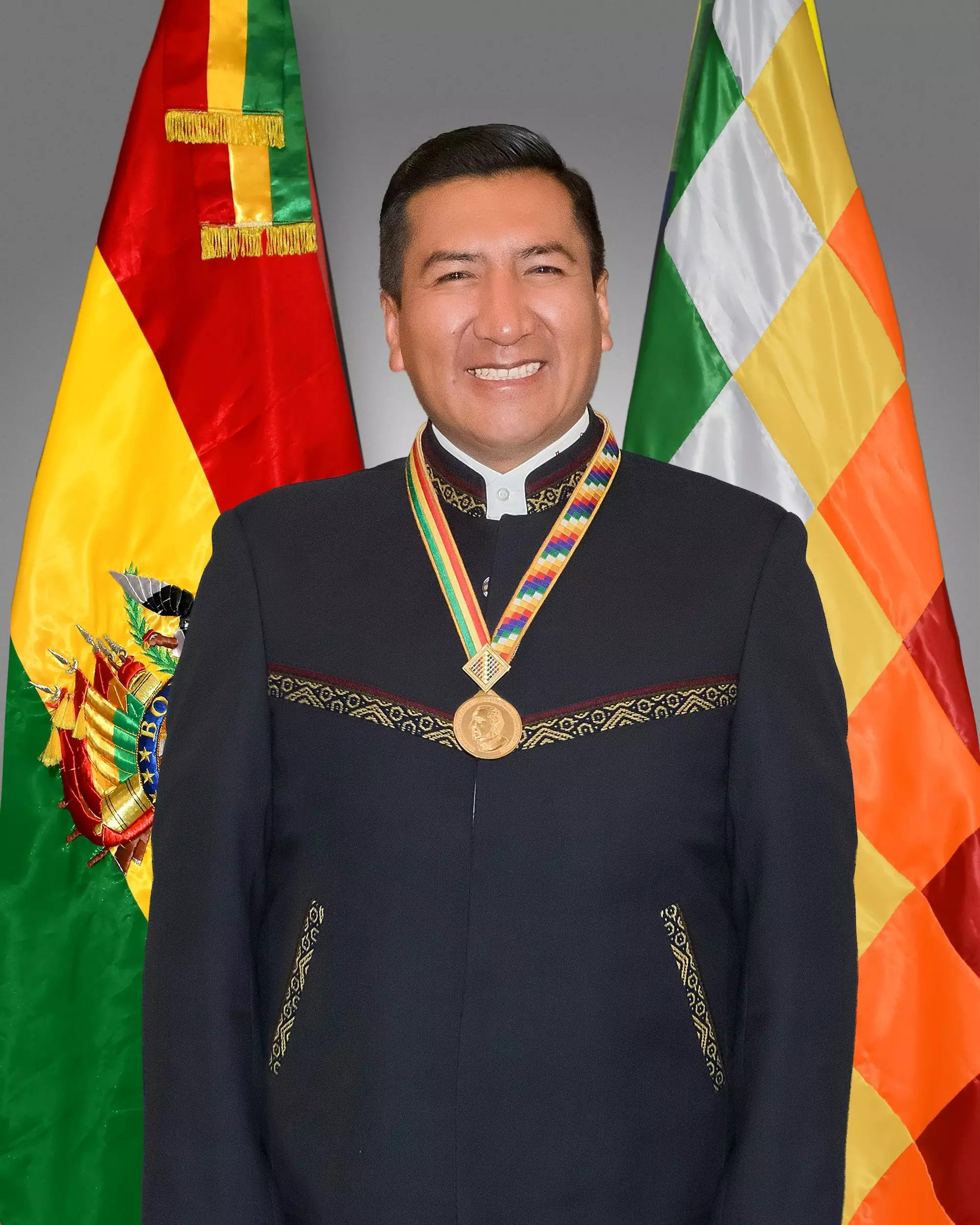
- Official portrait, 2020

President of the Chamber of Deputies
- In office 3 November 2020 – 4 November 2022
- Preceded by: Sergio Choque
- Succeeded by: Jerges Mercado Suárez

Member of the Chamber of Deputies from La Paz
- Incumbent
- Assumed office 3 November 2020
- Substitute: Persida Guaygua
- Preceded by: William Alvarado
- Constituency: Party list

Personal details
- Born: Freddy Mamani Laura; 8 December 1974 (age 51) Laramcota, La Paz, Bolivia
- Party: Movement for Socialism
- Education: René Barrientos Higher Normal Institute
- Occupation: Educator; politician; trade unionist

Freddy Mamani Laura (born 8 December 1974) is a Bolivian educator, politician, and trade unionist who served as president of the Chamber of Deputies from 2020 to 2022. A member of the Movement for Socialism, he has served as a party-list member of the Chamber of Deputies from La Paz since 2020. He previously served as executive secretary of the National Confederation of Rural Teachers of Bolivia and as departmental executive of the Federation of Rural Teachers of La Paz. Prior to entering politics, Mamani worked as a teacher, serving as the principal of various rural schools in the department.

== Early life and career ==
An ethnic Aymara, Freddy Mamani was born on 8 December 1974, one of eight children born to Bonifacio Mamani and Silveria Laura, both agricultural producers. Mamani was raised in Laramcota, a minor hamlet near Achiri in La Paz's Pacajes Provinces, where he completed his primary schooling. He graduated from secondary school in Achiri before briefly moving to La Paz, where he fulfilled his term of mandatory military service as part of the Army General Staff in Miraflores. Despite some early forays into trade union activity during his youth, Mamani ultimately opted to seek higher education as a teacher, motivated by a will to aid his parents in overcoming their illiteracy.

Mamani attended the René Barrientos Higher Normal Institute in Caracollo, Oruro, graduating with degrees in educational sciences, intercultural bilingual education, and communication and language, with a master's in education management. As a teacher, Mamani worked in various rural communities in the Altiplano and Yungas regions, where he taught middle school literature for two years. In the ensuing eight years, Mamani served as the principal of various schools in the department, during which time he assisted in founding Ancoraimes' Maca Maca School. After that, he was hired to teach at the Warisata Teacher Training School, where he continued to work until late 2020. During his career, Mamani's colleagues encouraged him to join the local teachers' union. He served for two years as executive of the Departmental Federation of Rural Teachers of La Paz (FDMERLP), later rising to become executive secretary of the National Confederation of Rural Teachers of Bolivia (CONMERB), where he served for four years.

== Chamber of Deputies ==
=== Election ===
When the Bolivian Workers' Center—CONMERB's parent organization and the primary ally of the Movement for Socialism (MAS-IPSP)—announced its intent to form its own caucus within the Legislative Assembly, Mamani was put forward to represent the rural education sector. The MAS nominated him as a candidate for deputy, and he topped the party's electoral list in the La Paz Department. Mamani won the seat and was re-nominated in 2020 after the 2019 results were annulled, being elected again to the same position.

=== Tenure ===
In internal meetings preceding the installation of the incoming legislature, the MAS caucus designated Mamani to exercise the presidency of the Chamber of Deputies, granting La Paz executive control over the lower chamber. The MAS majority in the Chamber of Deputies formally elected Mamani on 3 November 2020, making him the first representative of the rural education sector to hold the post, a position he pledged to use to promote the passage of education-related legislation. Mamani sought to be reelected to a second term in 2021 but failed to attain the support of his own La Paz caucus, which selected Hernán Durán by a vote of twenty-five to sixteen. However, broader disputes between the MAS's La Paz caucus and representatives from other departments, who put forward Santa Cruz Deputy Jerges Mercado, allowed Mamani to emerge as a consensus candidate, securing him a second term in a tight vote for the party's nomination.

Though similar internal disputes generated two competing MAS candidates the following year, Mamani was unable to formulate the same agreements to secure a third term in office. With neither La Paz's Freddy López nor Santa Cruz's Jerges Mercado willing to support the other, Mamani opted to suspend the session convened to elect a new directorate, giving the competing factions three days to reach an agreement. However, in his absence, supporters of Mercado went ahead with the election, enlisting the support of the parliamentary opposition to secure his accession to the presidency.

Mamani is aligned with the MAS's Evista party line, the faction closest to former president and party leader Evo Morales. During his presidency, he combatted opposition obstruction during the election of the chamber's directorate in 2021 and its Ethics Commission in 2022 by conducting legislative sessions with minimal advance notice or in different parliamentary facilities. In September 2022, after four failed votes, Mamani approved a last-minute change in parliamentary agenda to facilitate the election of Pedro Callisaya as the country's next ombudsman, taking advantage of the absence of over thirty opposition legislators, who were on leave for various reasons.

==== Commission assignments ====
- Chamber of Deputies Directorate (President; 3 November 2020 – 4 November 2022)
- Planning, Economic Policy, and Finance Commission
  - Science and Technology Committee (16 November 2022 – present)

== Electoral history ==
Electoral history of Freddy Mamani
Year	Office	Party	Votes			Result	Ref.
Year	Office	Party	Total	%	P.	Result	Ref.
2019	Deputy	Movement for Socialism	887,271	53.16%	1st (Note: Presented on an electoral list. The data shown represents the share of the vote the entire party/alliance received in that constituency.)	Annulled	
2020	Deputy	Movement for Socialism	1,162,949	68.36%	1st	Won	
Source: Plurinational Electoral Organ | Electoral Atlas

Chamber of Deputies of Bolivia
Preceded by William Alvarado	Member of the Chamber of Deputies from La Paz; 2020–present	Incumbent
Preceded by Sergio Choque	President of the Chamber of Deputies; 2020–2022	Succeeded by Jerges Mercado
