= Bertha Acarapi =

Bolivian politician and television presenter (born 1971)

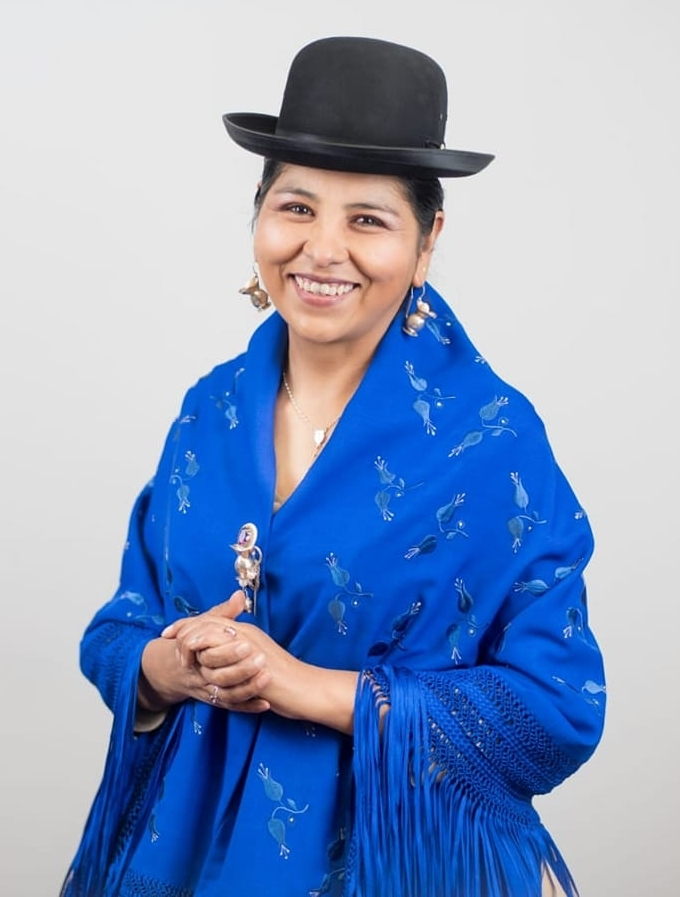
- Official portrait, 2020

Member of the Chamber of Deputies from La Paz
- Incumbent
- Assumed office 3 November 2020
- Substitute: Juanito Angulo (2020–2023)
- Preceded by: Brígida Quiroga
- Constituency: Party list

President of the El Alto Municipal Council
- In office 17 January 2006 – 17 January 2007
- Mayor: Fanor Nava
- Vice President: Wilson Soria
- Preceded by: Marcelo Vásquez
- Succeeded by: Gustavo Morales

Personal details
- Born: Bertha Beatriz Acarapi; 7 June 1971 (age 55) El Alto, La Paz, Bolivia
- Party: Movement for Socialism (2019–present)
- Other political affiliations: Revolutionary Left Movement (before 2004); Plan Progress for Bolivia (2004–2010)
- Education: Higher University of San Andrés
- Occupation: Politician; television presenter
- Bertha Acarapi's voice Press conference requesting an investigation by the Prosecutor's Office into issues of femicide in the country, 26 January 2022

Bertha Beatriz Acarapi (born 7 June 1971) is a Bolivian politician and former television presenter serving as a party-list member of the Chamber of Deputies from La Paz since 2020. A member of the Movement for Socialism, she previously served as an El Alto municipal councillor from 2000 to 2004 on behalf of the Revolutionary Left Movement and from 2004 to 2010 on behalf of Plan Progress for Bolivia. During her second term, she served as president of the El Alto Municipal Council from 2006 to 2007, becoming the first woman to assume that post. Outside of politics, Acarapi's lengthy career in radio and television journalism led her to join ATB in 2015, becoming one of the country's first high-profile chola indigenous presenters.

== Early life and career ==
Bertha Acarapi was born on 7 June 1971 in El Alto, the only child of Juana Acarapi, an Aymara merchant and seamstress who settled in the city at a young age. Prior to her birth, Acarapi's father was conscripted into the Armed Forces, never to return, and presumed dead by her mother. As such, Acarapi's grandfather, a farmer from Tacacoma, served as her primary paternal figure. "He always told me: 'you have to be honest', 'you have to be hard-working', 'you don't have to be vindictive'", she recalled. Through him, Acarapi learned to speak the Aymara language, in which she is fluent. Acarapi became active in local community leadership from age nine, accompanying her grandmother to neighborhood council meetings, where she assisted in their activities. She studied at the Juan Capriles School, primarily taking night classes as her mornings were spent helping her mother to sew and sell produce, while in the afternoon, she worked as an office assistant and school secretary. Later, Acarapi attended the Higher University of San Andrés, where she studied social work. Additionally, she holds several diplomas in political journalism, psychopedagogy, and diplomacy, as well as a master's degree in decentralization and public management.

=== Radio and television career ===
At the behest of a friend, in 1992, Acarapi enlisted to compete in the Cholita Alteña beauty contest, emerging as the competition's elected winner. The position granted Acarapi the opportunity to launch a career in local broadcast journalism, joining Radio San Gabriel before moving on to work as an announcer for Radio Sol and Radio Chuquiago. In addition, she lent her voice to a variety of commercials produced by the National Telecommunications Company, ENTEL. Later in 1992, Acarapi made the jump to television, hosting the program De Cara al Pueblo on Channel 24, then owned by the Alteño politician José Luis Paredes.

=== El Alto municipal councillor ===
Through her connection with Paredes, Acarapi was nominated by the Revolutionary Left Movement (MIR) to stand for office as a councillor for El Alto in the 1999 municipal elections. That year, significant popular support for Paredes' mayoral campaign allowed the MIR to win the city by a substantial plurality—almost forty-six percent—electing seven of the city's eleven councillors and dethroning the until-then dominant Conscience of Fatherland. Acarapi and her fellow MIR compatriots were subsequently sworn in on 5 February 2000. Despite her election as a member of the MIR, Acarapi later broke with the party, citing party leader Jaime Paz Zamora's decision to support President Gonzalo Sánchez de Lozada following the government's violent suppression of protesters in El Alto during the October 2003 gas conflict. In conjunction with other councillors, she joined Plan Progress for Bolivia (PP), the organization formed by Mayor Paredes, who also split with the MIR prior to his second mayoral bid. In the 2004 municipal elections, Acarapi successfully sought reelection on PP's electoral list, joining eight ex-Miristas on a municipal council that lacked any MIR presence for the first time in its eighteen years of existence. Two years later, she was unanimously elected to replace six-year incumbent Marcelo Vásquez as the president of the municipal council. The election of a woman was especially historic as the municipal council had until then never had a female president.

=== Return to television ===
Upon the completion of her second term in May 2010, Acarapi retired from political life. She returned to her work in broadcasting, initially joining Radio Fides. In 2014, Acarapi joined Red ATB as a morning and noon newscaster, reporting on national stories as well as some focusing on La Paz and El Alto. Her position made Acarapi one of Bolivia's first high-profile chola presenters, (Note: Remedios Loza is considered the country's first chola presenter.) a not insignificant advancement in indigenous representation in the country. In other fields, Acarapi taught as a professor at the Public University of El Alto and worked as a trainer on gender issues, during which time she traveled to numerous countries to teach women leadership skills. In entertainment, Acarapi held a modest career as a theatre and film actress, participating as an extra in multiple movies directed by Jorge Sanjinés and starring in the film 1808 (2019). In 2016, she performed in the play El Sueño de Raymundo at an event in Viacha. In modeling, Acarapi was a participant in 2018's Bolivia Moda fashion show. That same year, she joined five other models in showcasing traditional chola designs in Paris, France.

== Chamber of Deputies ==
=== Elections ===
External videos
- Bertha Acarapi 2019 Electoral Campaign Ad — Evo y Pueblo

In the leadup to the 2019 general elections, President Evo Morales invited Acarapi to run for a seat in the Chamber of Deputies on behalf of the Movement for Socialism (MAS-IPSP). After some consideration, Acarapi accepted the nomination, stating that it "[was an] opportunity to work for my city". In July, she formally resigned from her post at ATB to campaign for the second seat on the MAS's list of candidates for La Paz. Acarapi's candidacy was the source of some contention among different MAS-affiliated groups in El Alto, who criticized her for having previously belonged to "a neoliberal party". Notwithstanding, the MAS won the election in the La Paz Department, attaining 53.16 percent of the popular vote. However, broader accusations of electoral fraud resulted in nationwide social unrest, culminating in the resignation of Morales and the annulment of the election results. Amid continued protests, Acarapi and her family were forced to flee their home on one accusation, fearing a violent lynching that ultimately never came to pass. Even so, she returned as a candidate in the snap 2020 elections, emerging victorious in her second campaign.

=== Tenure ===
As a deputy, Acarapi primarily focused her work on El Alto, even installing her office in the city, seeking to serve as a "nexus between the central government and neighborhood organizations". Another core issue of her tenure revolved around women's rights in the country, particularly concerning the issue of femicide. In October 2021, Acarapi pointed out that less than six months since taking office, four municipal councillors in La Paz Department alone had resigned after suffering harassment, while a further ten reported enduring similar experiences. The deputy blamed a lack of compliance with and enforcement of Law N° 348—which ostensibly guarantees women's political rights—for these continued occurrences. As a member of the Association of Councilwomen of La Paz, Acarapi suggested the convocation of a national summit of women in government aimed at constructing public policies that would defend women's rights. Acarapi is also a proponent of LGBT rights, particularly transgender rights; in 2022, she and fellow Deputy Sabina Hilda Condori signed a strategic alliance with the Organization of Transgender Women of La Paz, aimed at combating discrimination and incidents of femicide against the community.

=== Commission assignments ===
- Territorial Organization of the State and Autonomies Commission
  - Municipal and Regional Autonomies Committee (2020–2022)
- Rural Native Indigenous Peoples and Nations, Cultures, and Interculturality Commission
  - Cultures, Interculturality, and Cultural Heritage Committee (2022–present)

== Electoral history ==
Electoral history of Bertha Acarapi
Year	Office	Party	Votes			Result	Ref.
Year	Office	Party	Total	%	P.	Result	Ref.
1999	Councillor	Revolutionary Left Movement	72,538	45.59%	1st	Won	(Note: Presented on an electoral list. The data shown represents the share of the vote the entire party/alliance received in that constituency.)
2002	Deputy	Revolutionary Left Movement	Withdrew			Lost	
2004	Councillor	Plan Progress for Bolivia	140,777	52.57%	1st	Won	
2019	Deputy	Movement for Socialism	887,271	53.16%	1st	Annulled	
2020	Deputy	Movement for Socialism	1,162,949	68.36%	1st	Won	
Source: Plurinational Electoral Organ | Electoral Atlas

Civic offices
Preceded by Marcelo Vásquez	President of the El Alto Municipal Council; 2006–2007	Succeeded by Gustavo Morales
Chamber of Deputies of Bolivia
Preceded by Brígida Quiroga	Member of the Chamber of Deputies from La Paz; 2020–present	Incumbent
