= Olivia Guachalla =

Bolivian politician (born 1984)

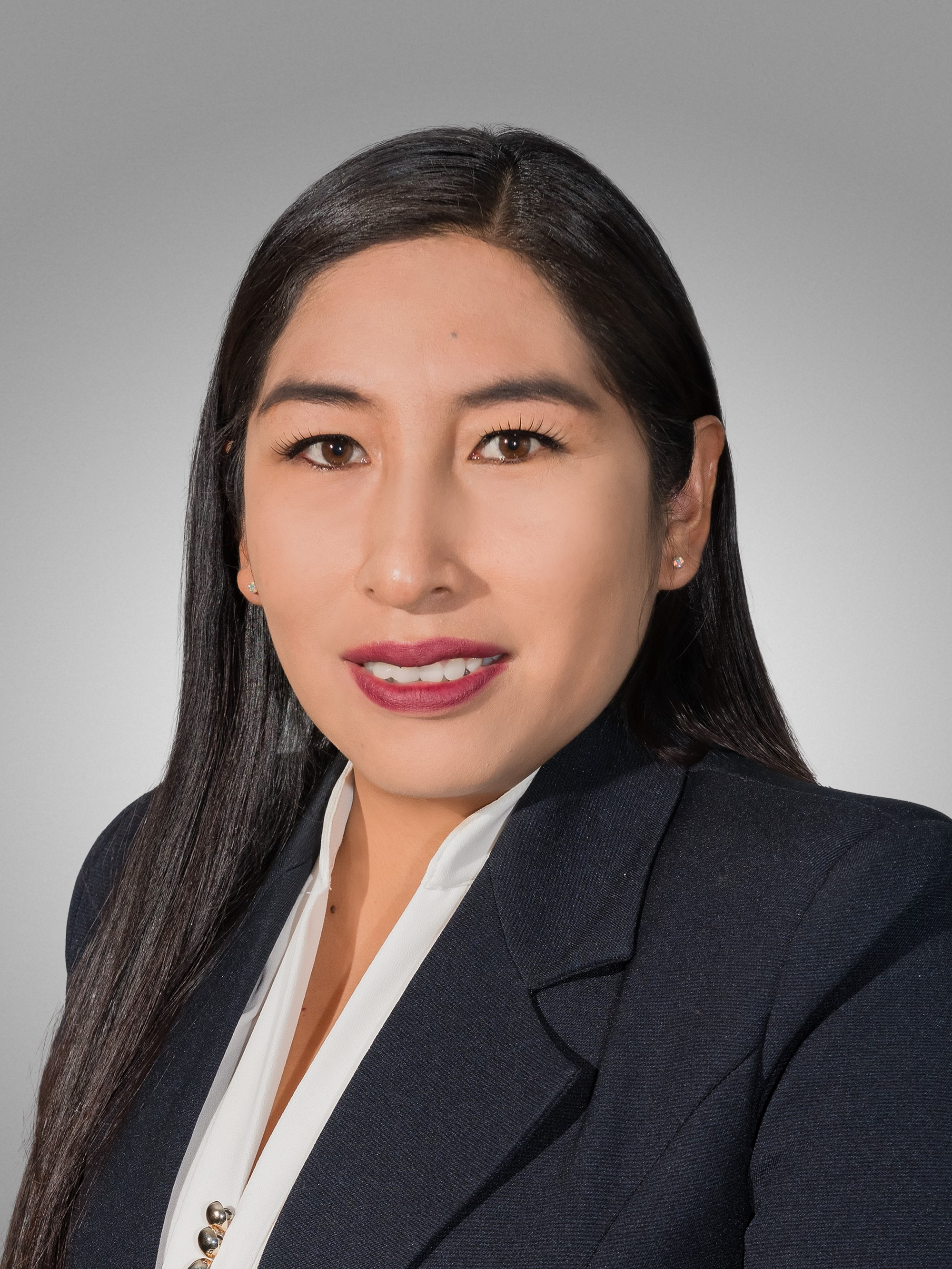
- Official portrait, 2020

Member of the Chamber of Deputies from Cochabamba circumscription 22
- Incumbent
- Assumed office 3 November 2020
- Substitute: Damián Laime
- Preceded by: Leoncio Jancko
- Constituency: Cercado

Personal details
- Born: Olivia Guachalla Yupanqui; 6 April 1984 (age 42) Puerto Parajachi, La Paz, Bolivia
- Party: Movement for Socialism (until 2023)
- Education: Higher University of San Simón
- Occupation: Lawyer; politician

Olivia Guachalla Yupanqui (born 6 April 1984) is a Bolivian lawyer and politician serving as a member of the Chamber of Deputies from Cochabamba, representing circumscription 22 since 2020. An ethnic Aymara, Guachalla entered political life as an activist in the student movement. After graduating from the Higher University of San Simón, she worked as a neighborhood council leader in the southern zone of Cochabamba.

Nominated by the Movement for Socialism to contest the area's constituency in the Chamber of Deputies, Guachalla won her race twice in two back-to-back elections. Once in office, however, Guachalla became estranged from the Cochabamba-based leadership of her party, with her alignment toward "renewist" factions ultimately resulting in her expulsion from it in 2023, alongside five other deputies.

== Early life and career ==
Olivia Guachalla was born on 6 April 1984 in the small town of Puerto Parajachi, a rural locality at the base of Cerro Ocorani, straddling the shoreline of Lake Titicaca in the Camacho Province of La Paz. She was the fourth of six children born to Francisco Guachalla and Justina Yupanqui, an ethnic Aymara family native to the highland region. Around the late 1990s, Guachalla and her family resettled in Cochabamba, taking up residence in District 9 of the city's southern zone, where her father worked as a community leader.

Guachalla became politically active at an early age, participating in the student movement while in high school, including serving as executive of the Federation of Secondary Students of Cochabamba. During this time, she also joined the ranks of the nascent Movement for Socialism (MAS-IPSP), engaging in some of the protests that rocked the country during the 2003 gas conflict.

Guachalla attended the Higher University of San Simón, where she studied law and communication science, graduating as a lawyer specializing in community social work and communitarian justice. Upon completing university, she dedicated herself to community organizing in the southern zone around District 9, where she worked as a member of the area's neighborhood council and local school board.

== Chamber of Deputies ==
=== Election ===
Guachalla's first foray into electoral politics was in 2010 when she was elected to represent the MAS as a substitute member of the Cochabamba Departmental Legislative Assembly. She served only one five-year term and was not put forward for reelection, remaining off her party's electoral slate until 2019, when the MAS nominated her to contest Cochabamba's circumscription 22. The constituency encompasses multiple districts in the capital municipality's southern zone, including her home ninth district as well as districts five, fifteen, and portions of four. She won the race twice, taking home a significant popular vote plurality in 2019 and—following the annulment of that year's results—an absolute majority the following year. In doing so, Guachalla became the first woman to represent Cochabamba city's southern zone in the Chamber of Deputies.

=== Tenure ===
During the campaign, Guachalla put forward a number of policy proposals core to her constituency, including, fundamentally, the expansion of public services in the poorer southern zone. Reforms to property rights was another topic Guachalla touched on, noting that the frequent lack of documentation proving land ownership often prevented residents from installing basic public services into their homes. One method of facilitating these developments, Guachalla proposed, would be to grant the southern zone increased autonomy, which she suggested could be done by separating the entire area into its own municipality, to be named San Joaquín de Itocta.

Guachalla's tenure coincided with a difficult period for her party, wracked by infighting between members loyal to MAS leader Evo Morales—Evistas—and so-called "renewers," those partial towards other leaders, such as incumbent president Luis Arce. As this conflict spilled into the Legislative Assembly at the tail end of 2022, Guachalla found herself accused of being an "anti-evista" by her parliamentary colleagues, most of whom—in Cochabamba—aligned with Morales. Guachalla rejected such allegations, arguing that supporting the incumbent president "does not make us traitors." Ultimately, Guachalla's alleged vote (Note: Guachalla later claimed that she was not present for the vote and that her substitute had cast it in her place.) in favor of a 2022 census law—supported by Arce but opposed by Morales—resulted in her expulsion from the MAS by its Morales-controlled Cochabamba affiliate early the following year. She joined five other deputies in being removed "with ignominy and dishonor", all from the Cochabamba caucus, including her substitute, Damián Laime. Guachalla denounced her expulsion as arbitrary and lacking legal merit and accused her detractors of being llunk'us (Note: From Quechua, meaning servile.) before Morales. The incident was one of the first consequential hostile volleys levied by the MAS's Evista wing against those considered disloyal to party leadership.

=== Commission assignments ===
- Constitution, Legislation, and Electoral System Commission
  - Constitutional Development and Legislation Committee (Secretary: 2020–2021)
- Plural Justice, Prosecutor's Office, and Legal Defense of the State Commission
  - Ordinary Jurisdiction and Magistracy Council Committee (2021–2022)
- Government, Defense, and Armed Forces Commission
  - Government and Bolivian Police Committee (Secretary: 2022–present)

== Electoral history ==
Electoral history of Olivia Guachalla
| Year | Office | Party | Votes | | | Result | Ref. |
| Year | Office | Party | Total | % | P. | Result | Ref. |
|---|---|---|---|---|---|---|---|
| 2010 | Sub. Assemblywoman | Movement for Socialism | 360,785 | 60.67% | 1st | Won | (Note: Presented on an electoral list. The data shown represents the share of the vote the entire party/alliance received in that constituency.) |
| 2019 | Deputy | Movement for Socialism | 65,289 | 47.29% | 1st | Annulled | |
| 2020 | Deputy | Movement for Socialism | 90,933 | 59.50% | 1st | Won | |
Source: Plurinational Electoral Organ | Electoral Atlas

Chamber of Deputies of Bolivia
| Preceded by Leoncio Jancko | Member of the Chamber of Deputies from Cochabamba circumscription 22; 2020–present | Incumbent |
