= Toribia Lero =

Bolivian politician

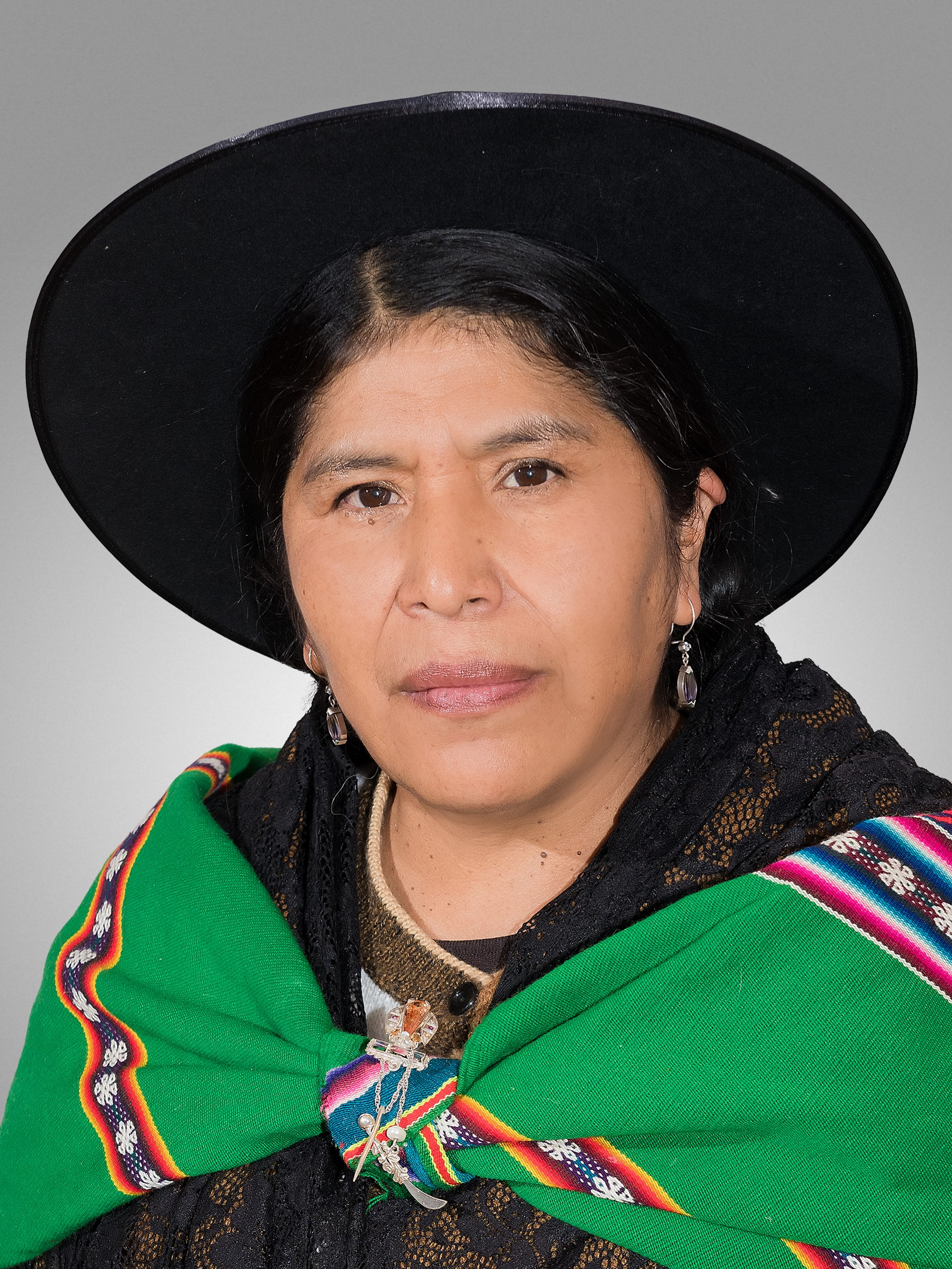
- Born: Toribia Lero Quispe
- Occupations: Assemblywoman, human rights activist

Toribia Lero Quispe is a Bolivian politician and activist for indigenous rights, women’s rights, and democracy. She currently serves as a member of the Bolivian Legislative Assembly and is a leader of the democratic opposition party. Born in Tapacari condor Apacheta ayllu of the Suras Urinsaya nation, she has worked for territorial reconstitution of the Indigenous Peoples of the Bolivian highlands. She currently serves on the UN Women Bolivia Advisory Group and the Jatun Ayllu Kirkiawi territorial organization, as well as groups committed to ending violence against women, especially indigenous women.

In 2019, independent election observers from the Organization of American States and the European Union uncovered electoral fraud committed by the administration of Evo Morales, and that Toribia was one such politician whose election had been tampered with.

Toribia and her fellow democrats are targets of violence, intimidation, and widespread persecution by state actors due to their opposition to the Movement for Socialism party platform.
