= Jerges Mercado =

Bolivian politician (born 1970)

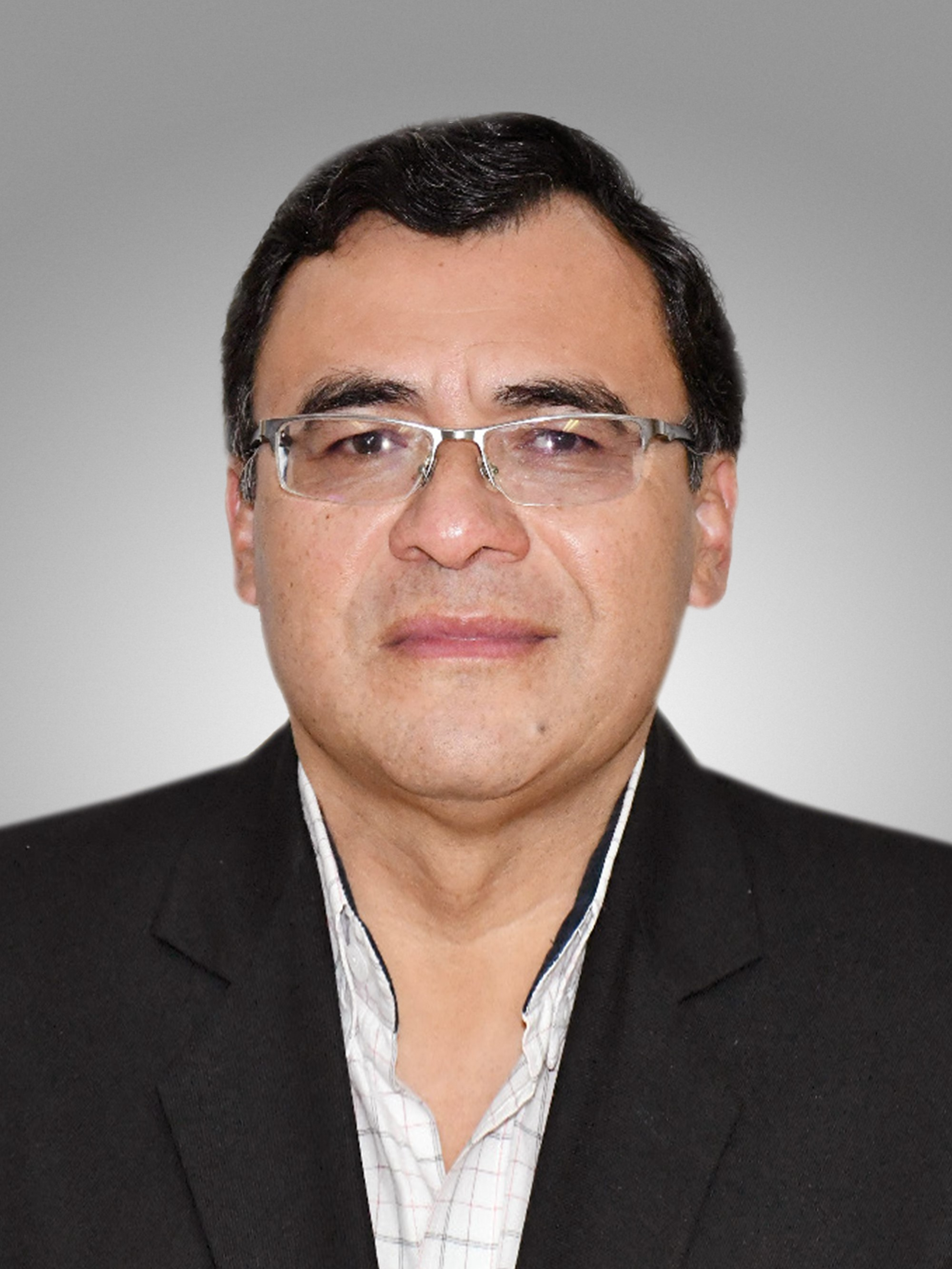
- Jerges Mercado Suárez in 2020

President of the Chamber of Deputies of Bolivia
- In office 4 November 2022 – 3 November 2023
- Preceded by: Freddy Mamani Laura
- Succeeded by: Israel Huaytari Martínez

Personal details
- Political party: Movimiento al Socialismo

Jerges Mercado Suárez (born in 1970) is a Bolivian politician. He was President of the Chamber of Deputies from 2022 to 2023. He previously served as Minister of Services and Public Works.
