= Israel Huaytari =

Bolivian politician (born 1985)

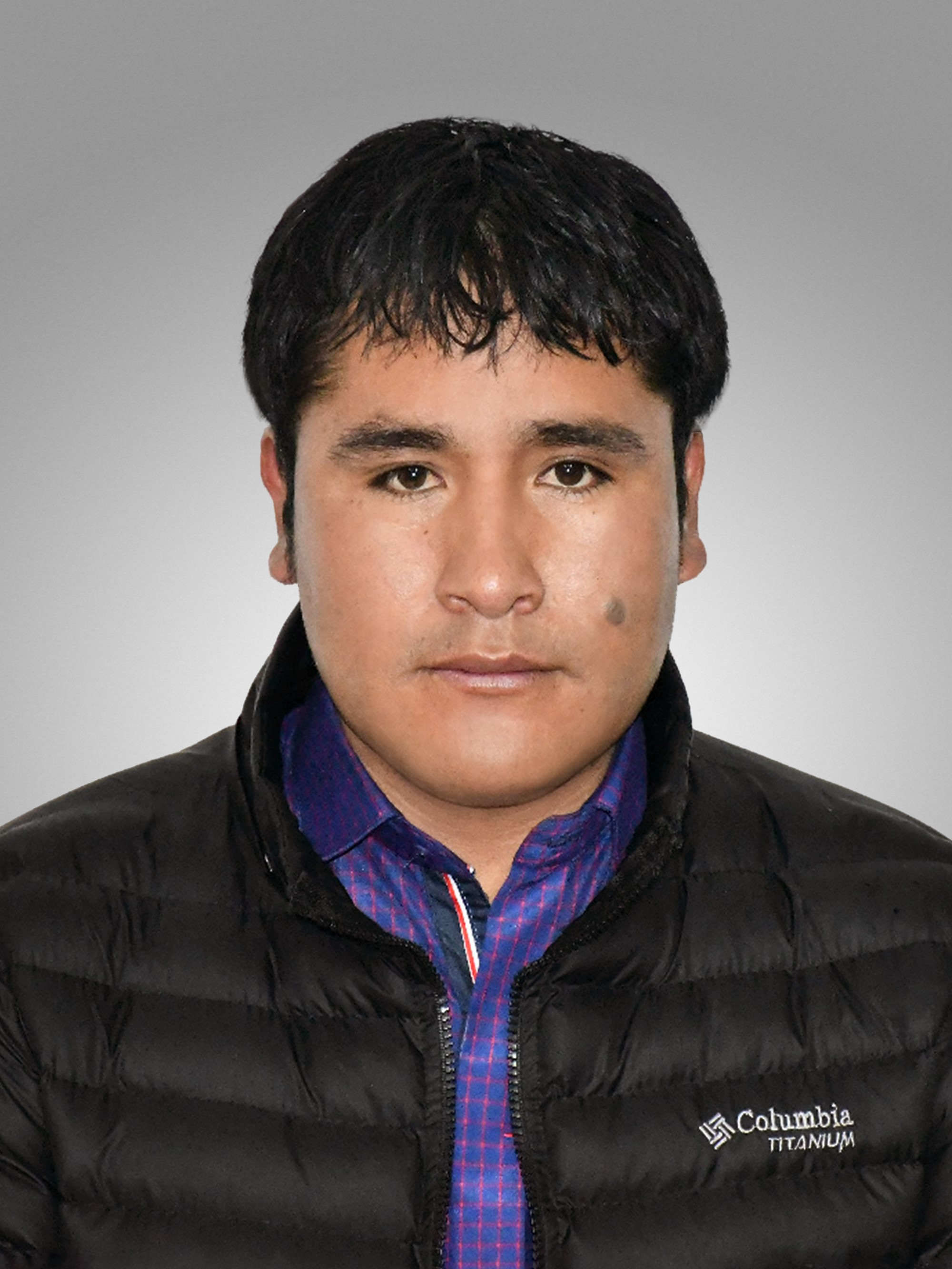
- Official portrait, 2020

President of the Chamber of Deputies of Bolivia
- In office 3 November 2023 – 29 October 2024
- Preceded by: Jerges Mercado Suárez
- Succeeded by: Omar Yujra

Personal details
- Born: August 30, 1985 (age 40)
- Political party: Movimiento al Socialismo

Israel Huaytari Martínez (born 30 August 1985) is a Bolivian politician representing the 39-Potosí constituency in the Chamber of Deputies. He was President of the Chamber of Deputies from 2023 to 2024. He was succeeded by Omar Yujra.
