= Omar Yujra =

Bolivian politician (born 1980)

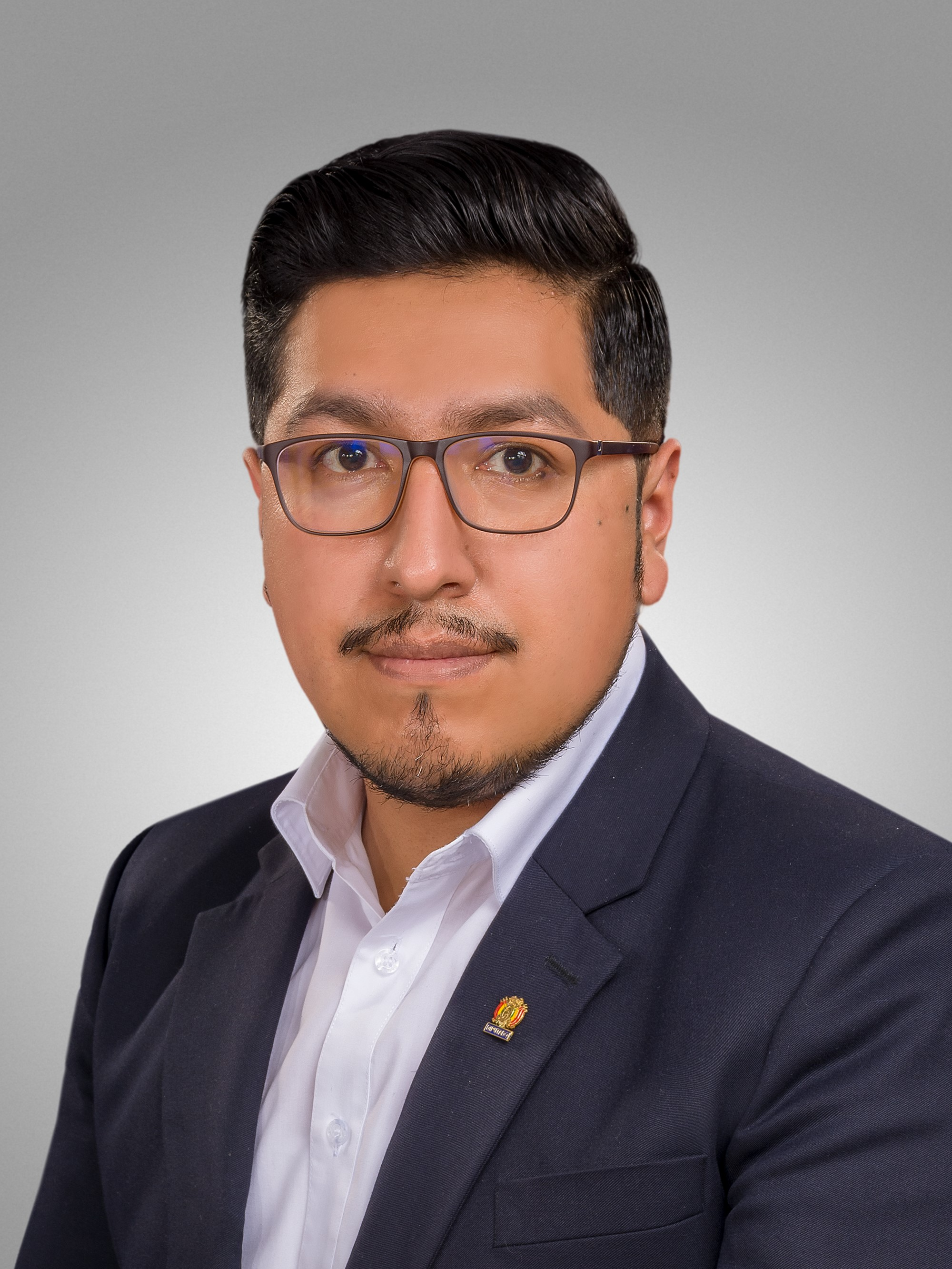
- Official portrait, 2020

President of the Chamber of Deputies
- In office 5 November 2024 – 6 November 2025
- Preceded by: Israel Huaytari
- Succeeded by: Roberto Castro Salazar

Personal details
- Born: 5 March 1980 (age 45) La Paz, Bolivia
- Political party: Movimiento al Socialismo

Omar Al Yabhat Yujra Santos (born 5 March 1980) is a Bolivian politician who served as President of the Chamber of Deputies from 2024 to 2025, and in the chamber as a member of Movimiento al Socialismo since 2020. Prior to his election to the chamber he worked in the Ministry of Economy.

== Early life and education ==
Omar Al Yabhat Yujra Santos was born in La Paz on 5 March 1980. He graduated with a bachelor's degree in economics and a master's degree in economics, international trade, and integration. He conducted postgraduate education at the National University of La Plata.

== Career ==
Yujra worked at the National Tax Service. He worked for the Ministry of Economy for twelve years where he was a budget analyst, unit manager, and Director General of Budget Programming and Management. Minister Mario Guillén appointed Yujra as Vice Minister of Pensions and Financial Services on 10 August 2018.

In the 2020 election Yujra was elected to the Chamber of Deputies as a member of Movimiento al Socialismo (MAS). During his tenure in the chamber he served as Planning, Economic Policy, and Finance commission.

Yujra was elected to succeed Israel Huaytari Martínez as president of the chamber. His support came from MAS members aligned with Luis Arce and Civic Community deputies while supporters of Evo Morales wanted Santos Mamani to become president. During the vote Huaytari attempted to declare a recess, but the Evo supporters interrupted him and blocked him from leaving the chamber. He assumed the presidency on 5 November 2024. He announced that an Ethics commission would be formed when the chamber reconvened in 2025.

== Works cited ==
=== News ===
- "Omar Yujra es el nuevo viceministro de Pensiones". Agencia de Noticias Fides. 10 August 2018. Archived from the original on 26 June 2025.
- Carreño, Alejandra (6 November 2024). "Quien es Omar Yujra, el nuevo presidente de la Cámara de Diputados". Los Tiempos. Archived from the original on 6 November 2024.
- Saravia, Mauricio (5 November 2024). "Omar Yujra es elegido presidente de Diputados en polémica y bochornosa sesión". La Razón. Archived from the original on 25 June 2025.

=== Web ===
- "Omar Al Yabhat Yujra Santos". Chamber of Deputies. Archived from the original on 25 June 2025.
- Montaño, Joset (31 December 2024). "Diputados priorizará la conformación de la Comisión de Ética al volver del receso". Chamber of Deputies. Archived from the original on 26 June 2025.
- Vasquez, Eliana (5 November 2024). "Posesionan nueva directiva de la Cámara de Diputados presidida por Omar Yujra". Chamber of Deputies. Archived from the original on 26 June 2025.
