= Rafael Quispe =

Bolivian politician (born 1969)

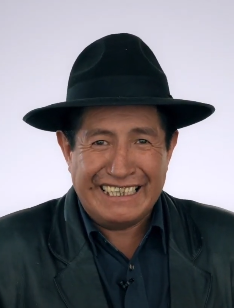

Vice Minister of Decolonization
- In office 13 October 2020 – 4 November 2020
- President: Jeanine Áñez
- Minister: Álvaro Coimbra
- Preceded by: Leonardo Montaño
- Succeeded by: Pelagio Condori

General Executive Director of the Indigenous Development Fund
- In office 26 November 2019 – 8 May 2020
- President: Jeanine Áñez
- Minister: Mauricio Ordoñez; Eliane Capobianco
- Preceded by: Braulio Yucra
- Succeeded by: Fernando Vargas

Member of the Chamber of Deputies from La Paz
- Substitute
- In office 23 January 2015 – 26 November 2019 (Note: Suspended: 22 December 2016 – 22 June 2017.)
- Deputy: María Eugenia Calcina
- Preceded by: Lidia Paucara
- Succeeded by: Luis Fernando Zegarra
- Constituency: Party list

Personal details
- Born: Rafael Arcángel Quispe Flores; 24 October 1969 (age 56) Sicuypata, La Paz, Bolivia
- Party: Somos Pueblo (2019–present)
- Other political affiliations: Independent (before 2018); Venceremos (2018–2019)
- Education: Center for Accelerated Secondary Education
- Occupation: Indigenous leader; politician
- Rafael Quispe's voice Aymara language public service announcement conveying COVID-19 prevention measures.

Rafael Arcángel Quispe Flores (born 24 October 1969), often referred to as Tata Quispe, is a Bolivian indigenous activist and politician who served as general executive director of the Indigenous Development Fund from 2019 to 2020. He previously served as a substitute party-list member of the Chamber of Deputies from La Paz under María Eugenia Calcina from 2015 to 2019.

Born in Coro Coro and raised in rural poverty, Quispe completed secondary education in El Alto. He studied law at multiple universities, though he never completed a degree. He held prominent positions of local leadership in and around his Aymara community, serving as mallku of the Caquingora Marka and later mallku of the Pakajaqi Suyu. In 2010, he was elected to the governing board of the National Council of Ayllus and Markas of Qullasuyu, serving as mallku of the organization's Extractive Industries Commission. His opposition to President Evo Morales gained him national prominence during the conflict over the Isiboro Sécure National Park and Indigenous Territory, during which time he led indigenous protests against a planned highway crossing through the protected area.

Quispe entered national politics in the 2014 general election, losing a race for a seat in the Chamber of Deputies but later being authorized to serve as a substitute deputy. Quispe's humorous but polemic style of politics made him a controversial figure, with members of both the ruling Movement for Socialism and his own caucus denouncing him for various acts. In 2019, President Jeanine Áñez appointed him to direct the country's Indigenous Development Fund, and he later briefly served as vice minister of decolonization. In late 2020, Quispe launched his candidacy for the governorship of La Paz, running on a ticket led by his own Somos Pueblo party. He narrowly failed to move to the second round, placing third in the election. Shortly thereafter, Quispe announced his retirement from politics.

== Early life and career ==
An ethnic Aymara, Rafael Quispe was born on 24 October 1969 in the Sicuypata Ayllu of La Paz's Coro Coro Municipality, a locale that, according to local indigenous custom, is situated in the Caquingora Marka of the Pakajaqi Suyu. (Note: Per indigenous custom, the Aymara realm (Qullasuyu) is divided between suyus (provinces) made up of markas (regions), agglomerations of multiple autonomous ayllus, the collective landholdings of the Aymara. They are represented by a mallku (traditional leader) elected through usos y costumbres.) He is the youngest of eight siblings born to Manuela Flores; their father, a local miner, died when he was 18. Raised in rural poverty, Quispe completed lower secondary education in Coro Coro before dropping out to focus on cattle grazing and sheepherding. As a young adult, he entered the Armed Forces to fulfill his period of mandatory military service. Despite being an exceptional serviceman, Quispe was precluded from attaining the rank of corporal due to his lack of a high school diploma, a fact that motivated him to complete his education. He moved to El Alto, graduating from the Center for Accelerated Secondary Education before going on to work in a variety of blue-collar fields, including as a cobbler, mechanic, and service driver. During this time, Quispe intermittently studied law at multiple institutions, including the Higher University of San Andrés, before settling at the University of Valle, though he ultimately did not finish his degree.

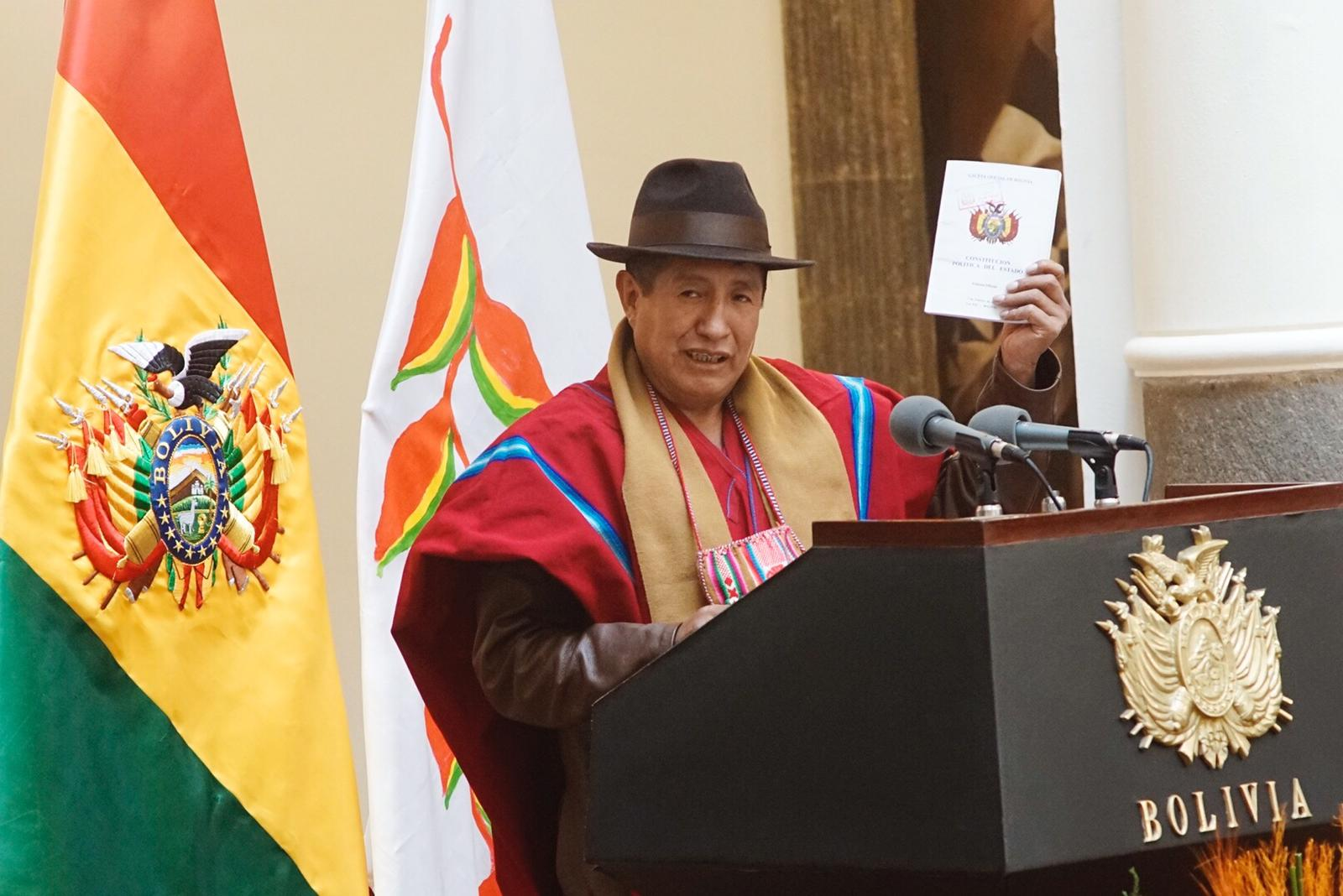
As a member of CONAMAQ, Quispe gained notoriety for his vocal criticism of the government, particularly concerning its environmental policy and fraught relationship with indigenous communities.

Returning to Coro Coro, in 2000, Quispe, together with his mother, assumed a position of local leadership within his ayllu. He held prominent posts in the region until 2005, being named mallku of his marka and later mallku of the entire suyu. In the 2002 general election, he threw his weight behind the Pachakuti Indigenous Movement, supporting the presidential campaign of Felipe Quispe. Following the election of Gonzalo Sánchez de Lozada, Quispe was an active opposition leader, taking part in protests in El Alto during the 2003 gas conflict. Quispe's rise within indigenist circles culminated in his 2010 election as a member of the governing board of the National Council of Ayllus and Markas of Qullasuyu (CONAMAQ), serving as mallku of the organization's Extractive Industries Commission. Upon the conclusion of his term, he served as CONAMAQ's representative at the Andean Coordinator of Indigenous Organizations, an international organization with presence in six countries and consultative status with the United Nations.

Originally a supporter of President Evo Morales, Quispe later soured on the indigenous leader. In particular, he accused Morales's policies of failing to reflect his environmentalist rhetoric, citing the president's support for extractive industries such as mining and petroleum. In an interview with Bill Weinberg for the NACLA Report on the Americas, Quispe denounced the government's environmental policy as a "systematic violation of the rights of the peoples and of the Pachamama," accusing Morales of being "the foremost violator of Mother Earth." Quispe's active opposition to the Morales administration gained him national notoriety in 2011 when he became one of the primary leaders of the indigenous march in defense of the Isiboro Sécure National Park and Indigenous Territory, which protested the government's attempt to construct a highway running through the protected area without prior consultation with the native population.

== Chamber of Deputies ==
=== Election ===
By late 2013, Quispe, having risen to national prominence, sought to position himself as an indigenous alternative to the ruling Movement for Socialism (MAS-IPSP), with his name emerging as a potential candidate for the presidency on behalf of CONAMAQ. Despite stating that he would accept heading the ticket if nominated, Quispe admitted that his chances of reaching the presidency were negligible. Nonetheless, he outlined that his front's main goal was not the presidency but rather to attain independent indigenous representation in the Plurinational Legislative Assembly.

In November, Quispe's faction of CONAMAQ brokered a political agreement with the Green Party (PVB-IEP) to jointly contest the 2014 general elections. To this was added the "freethinkers," a faction of MAS dissidents led by former Chamber of Deputies president Rebeca Delgado. However, internal disputes over the coalition's presidential ballot quickly fractured the alliance, with the "freethinkers" pushing Delgado for the presidency while CONAMAQ lobbied for Quispe to head the ticket. In February 2014, Quispe broke CONAMAQ's pact with the PVB, opting instead to sign an alliance with Samuel Doria Medina's National Unity Front (UN). As part of their five-point agreement, Doria Medina pledged to give indigenous candidates a twenty percent share on the alliance's electoral list.

As a means of consolidating a single presidential ticket, UN and its allies presented five pre-candidates as possible contenders for the nomination, including Quispe. The winner of this makeshift primary election was selected through a nationwide poll conducted between 19 and 20 April. On 21 April, Doria Medina was presented as the winning candidate, attaining the preference of sixty-nine percent of the 2,652 individuals surveyed. Unofficial data released by La Razón placed Quispe in third place with ten percent of the vote. In the ensuing weeks, Quispe was presented on the coalition's preliminary electoral list as a possible candidate for substitute senator together with Soledad Chapetón. However, Quispe rejected the nomination, maintaining that he was unwilling to be the running mate of someone "who did not fight for the demands of the country's indigenous movement." He also expressed his discontent with the lack of indigenous presence on the final list of candidates, threatening to withdraw CONAMAQ's support if the issue was not rectified.

Ultimately, Quispe was nominated as a candidate for deputy, placing fifth on the Democratic Unity (UD) coalition's electoral list. UD's mediocre performance in the La Paz Department garnered it just four party-list deputies, precluding Quispe from entering the chamber. However, in November, UD requested that the Supreme Electoral Tribunal (TSE) authorize Quispe to serve as a substitute deputy, filling the vacancy left by María Eugenia Calcina, who assumed the primary position due to Jaime Navarro's last-minute withdrawal from the race.

=== Tenure ===
Throughout his term in the Chamber of Deputies, Quispe's humorous but polemic style of politics, described by Página Siete as "characterized by ... sarcastic statements or by attitudes that he assumed in certain controversial cases," made him a well-known and contentious figure. In one instance, Quispe infamously gifted a "basic level" Aymara language translation dictionary to President Morales when the debate over the head of state's native language proficiency was in vogue. When Morales sought to amend the Constitution to abolish term limits, Quispe protested the move, attending a session of the lower house adorned with a cardboard Inca crown, mockingly declaring: "I also want to be a king." The deputy's lighthearted attitude "provoke[d] laughter from the journalists who interview[ed] him, from the politicians who surround[ed] him, and from internet users who never tire[d] of sharing his statements on social networks." Conversely, critics accused Quispe of being a "clown" who "turns everything into a joke" in order to get "three more minutes in the media," with one MAS legislator describing him as the "Chapulín Colorado" of the Legislative Assembly. For his part, Quispe defended his behavior, stating that "I do striking things, but I do them so that the people understand ... in a didactic way what is happening in the country." "The message you give to people is better accepted with humor," he stated.

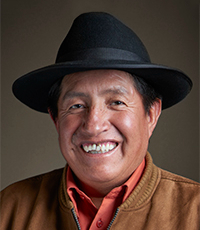
Official portrait, c. 2016

The many political stunts Quispe pulled were often accompanied by serious accusations against ruling party officials or otherwise made light of allegations levied against him. In early 2015, Quispe became involved as a plaintiff in an investigation into embezzlement within the Indigenous Development Fund. Inspectors found that over 700 public works projects sponsored by the Indigenous Fund had been left unfinished or never even existed at all, with the public resources having been distributed into private accounts or political campaigns, constituting Bs 102 million in economic damage to the State. In March of that year, Quispe accused Felipa Huanca—then the MAS candidate for the governorship of La Paz—of having Bs 1 million in assets of unknown origin, adding that she had received Bs 99,528 from the Indigenous Fund during her time as a legal representative for the Bartolina Sisa Confederation. Huanca went on to lose the gubernatorial election, for which she sued Quispe on allegations of political harassment and discrimination.

The oral trial against Quispe was opened by La Paz's First Anti-Corruption and Violence Against Women Court on 7 February 2018. Quispe failed to attend the hearing three times, considering it a waste of time, for which an arrest warrant to secure his presence was issued. In response, Quispe challenged judicial officials to apprehend him, even waiting outside the office of departmental prosecutor Edwin Blanco, bringing with him a tray of fifteen eggs "in case he lacks them." (Note: In Spanish slang, huevos (eggs) can be used to mean testicles, the insinuation being that Blanco lacked the courage to arrest him.) After continued frequent absences, law enforcement officials arrested Quispe on 16 May, transferring the legislator in handcuffs to the courthouse. There, as an alternative to preventative detention, a judge permitted him to defend himself in freedom so long as he did not leave the country and refrained from making any public statements about Huanca. In a subsequent press conference, Quispe appeared before media outlets in silence, having tapped shut his mouth with a piece of paper labelled "do not ask me about her."

Quispe's confrontational attitude quickly established him as a prominent independent figure within the legislature, with disputes between himself and members of both the ruling party and his own caucus even netting him a six-month suspension from office at one point. Less than a year into his term, Quispe withdrew himself from his alliance with UN, citing disagreements with Deputy Jimena Costa, the caucus's leader in the Chamber of Deputies, whom he regarded as a "[MAS] infiltrator." For the duration of his tenure, Quispe operated largely independently of his caucus, remaining connected with legislators of the Social Democratic Movement (MDS)—the secondary force within the UD alliance, after UN—but never fully joining the party's ranks. Instead, Quispe maintained individual working relationships with like-minded legislators; in particular, Urgente.bo noted his association with UN deputies Amilcar Barral and Wilson Santamaría, with the three parliamentarians having "closed ranks as a trio."

=== 2019 presidential campaign ===
When the TSE digitized its electoral roll in the leadup to the 2019 general election, Quispe was erroneously registered as a partisan of the Movement for Socialism. In response, the legislator joked with reporters that he now "smell[ed] of corruption. I'm washing myself with bleach in vain; it doesn't come out." In addition to assuring that he would file a complaint with the Prosecutor's Office, Quispe also used to opportunity to contest the MAS's presidential primary, seeking to challenge Morales for the nomination. As part of his joke campaign, Quispe invited the president of the Chamber of Deputies, Gabriela Montaño, to serve as his running mate, a proposition the MAS legislator called "idiotic." Given the rejection, Quispe later selected Juana Calle, former mama t'alla of CONAMAQ, as his vice-presidential companion.

Quispe's presidential bid was controversial amongst MAS partisans, with the legislator denouncing multiple threats to his life throughout the primary campaign, for which he requested police protection. From Omasuyos Province, leaders of the Red Ponchos—an indigenous militia—threatened to submit Quispe to "community justice" should he attempt to campaign in the region. In response, Quispe, donning his own black poncho, challenged the militiamen to a whip duel, saying, "let's see who whips harder." The conflict reemerged months later when, in the midst of verbal attacks, Quispe was nearly whipped outside of parliament by a group of Red Ponchos. The following day, he personally traveled to Achacachi to summon them to a duel, but the challenge was not met. "They've chickened out," he stated before returning to La Paz. Ultimately, Quispe's campaign led the MAS's Ethics Court to officially expel him from the party, with the TSE removing his name from the MAS's electoral roll in early December, thus disqualifying him from primarying Morales.

Nearing the election date, Quispe warned that if Morales won reelection to a fourth term, he and many others would not recognize the results. Quispe pointed to a constitutional referendum rejecting the abolishment of terms limits to justify his view of Morales as an "illegal candidate," warning that should the president win, "the only way to remove [him] from the [presidential] palace [will be] with mobilizations, with blockades, and with blood." Quispe's statements preceded broader unrest in the country, with allegations of electoral fraud sparking mass protests nationwide, culminating in Morales's resignation just over a month later.

== Indigenous Development Fund ==
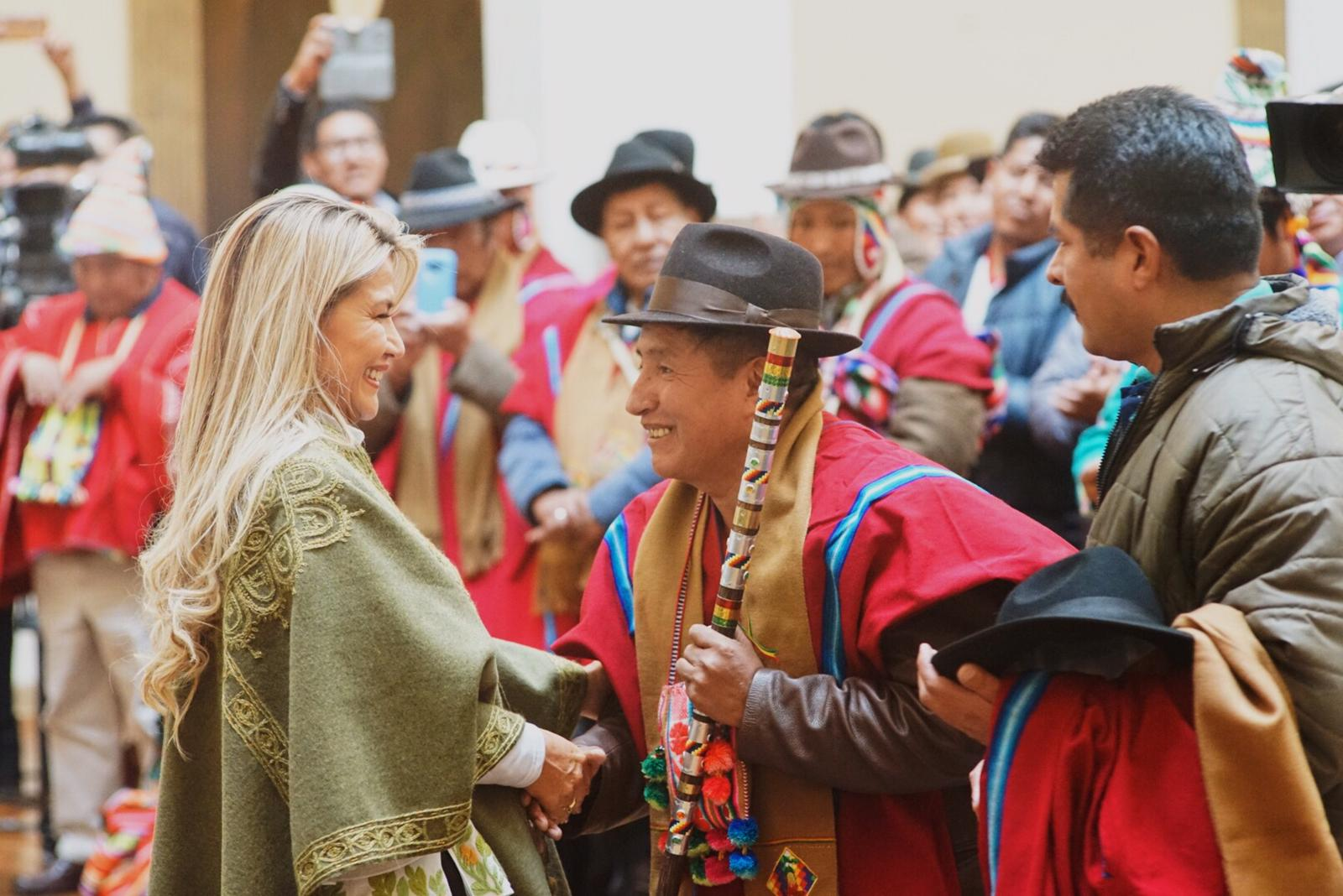
Áñez appointed Quispe to head the Indigenous Development Fund.

Shortly after Morales's removal from office, his successor, transitional president Jeanine Áñez, appointed Quispe to serve as general executive director of the Indigenous Development Fund, a move interpreted as a gesture towards the country's indigenous community, whose relationship with Morales was mixed. In his inaugural speech, Quispe pledged to "put the Indigenous Fund in order," continuing projects benefitting indigenous communities while at the same time "unmask[ing] those bad leaders who have used and abused the economic resources of this prestigious institution." In that regard, Quispe announced an immediate audit of all ongoing projects with the aim of recovering embezzled assets and prosecuting corrupt authorities. "We are going to reconstitute the Indigenous Fund," he stated.

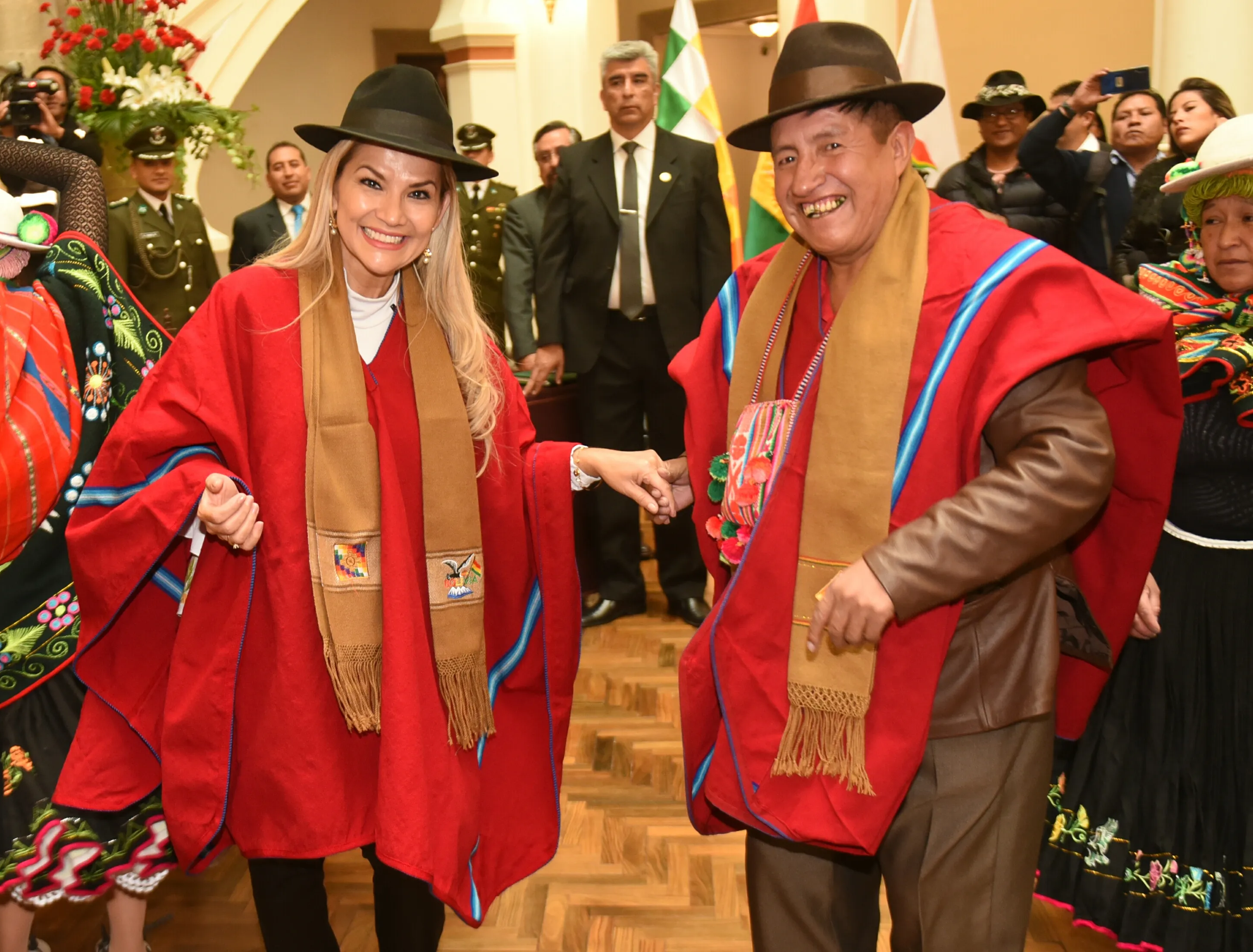
Áñez and Quispe adorned with red ponchos during his inauguration.

As head of the Indigenous Fund, Quispe oversaw the reactivation of the body's long-stalled embezzlement inquiry, expanding the case to include many of Morales's most influential former ministers. In December, the Fund submitted a request to revoke the house arrest granted to former minister Nemesia Achacollo; judicial authorities complied, transferring her to Miraflores prison as a measure of preventative detention. Early into the new year, Quispe expanded the investigation to include former members of the Indigenous Fund's board of supervisors, a body presided over by former ministers Juan Ramón Quintana, Carlos Romero, and Luis Arce. The latter, notably, had been selected as the MAS's presidential candidate, drawing complaints of political persecution. Finally, in February, Felipa Huanca was arrested after immigration authorities accused her of attempting to flee the country. In its reporting of the event, El Deber noted Quispe's role in Huanca's apprehension, stating: "the former Bartolina was relentless [against Quispe], and now the tables have turned." Ultimately, however, prosecutors failed to provide sufficient evidence to justify Huanca's continued incarceration as a flight risk, leading to her release less than forty-eight hours later.

With the outbreak of the COVID-19 pandemic, the Áñez administration imposed a mandatory quarantine on the population, including a strict prohibition on public gatherings. In mid-April, the Prosecutor's Office opened an investigation into Quispe on allegations that he violated this norm by meeting with community leaders in San Pedro de Curahuara, (Note: Initial sources indicated that the meeting took place in Marquirivi; however, the mayor of Achocalla—the encompassing municipality—denied this. Ensuing sources indicated that San Pedro de Curahuara was the actual locale in which the conference was held.) for which he faced being charged for crimes against public health. Quispe denied any wrongdoing, assuring that the event had been organized to convey pandemic prevention measures and that he had not expected such high attendance. Nonetheless, the scandal led Minister of Government Arturo Murillo to publicly request Quispe's resignation, an action he refused to take, regarding it as an admission of guilt. "It is not worth resigning because ... I have not committed any infraction," he insisted. Instead, Quispe left the decision in Áñez's hands, arguing that only she had the authority to remove him.

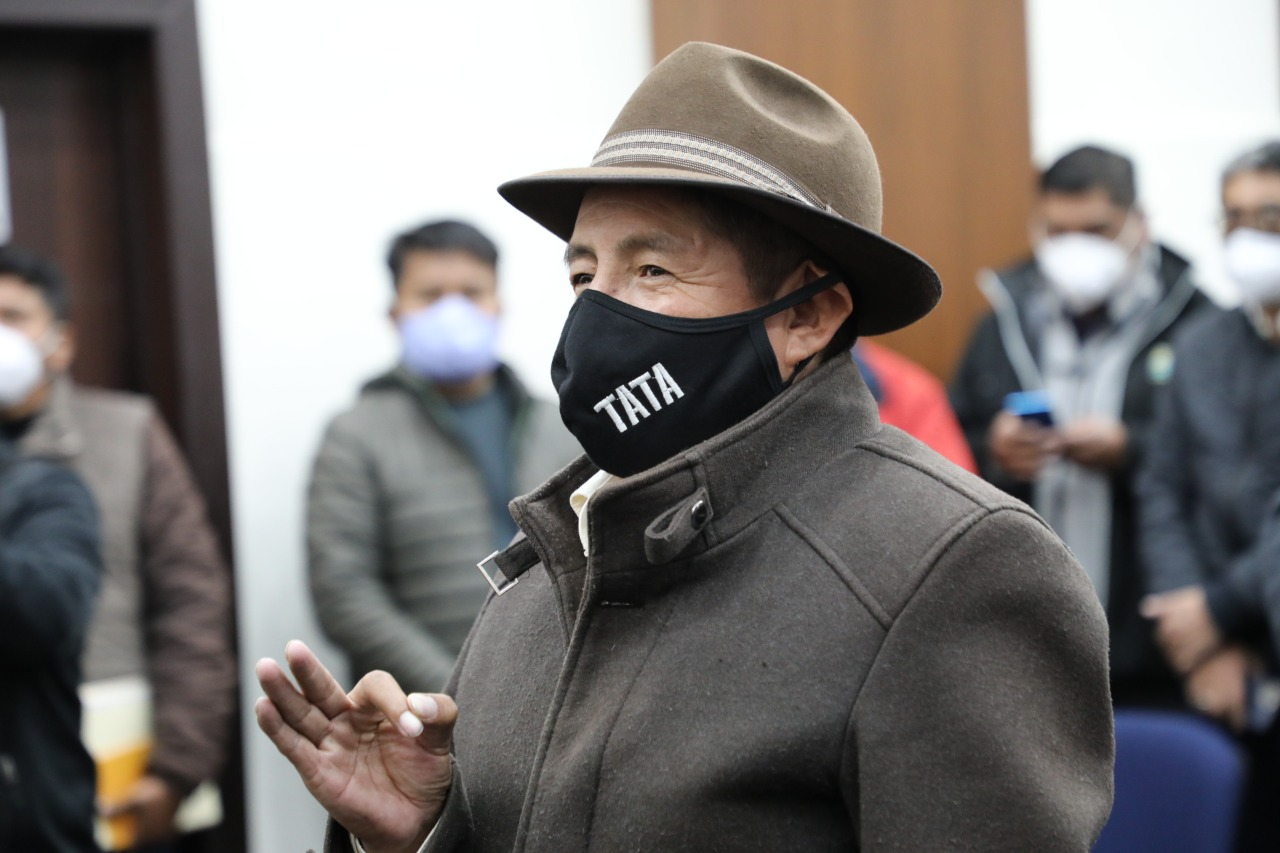
Quispe is sworn in as vice minister of decolonization.

The president formally nullified Quispe's appointment on 8 May, bringing his term to an end just over six months after he first assumed office. In Quispe's place, Germán Huanca was initially designated to head the Indigenous Fund, though the appointment was later retracted. Nonetheless, Quispe opted to vacate his office anyway, stating that he would not "cling on to the position." Even so, he lamented his removal, expressing his view that Áñez had allowed herself to be influenced by Murillo. In a later editorial, Página Siete noted that Quispe's removal constituted "the first of at least four reliefs that are attributed to Murillo's power to grant or take away positions within the government."

Following his removal, Minister Eliane Capobianco announced that Quispe would continue to work with the government, playing a minor role within the Ministry of Rural Development. Quispe rejected the opportunity, stating that if the government truly believed his crime serious enough to remove him from the Indigenous Fund, they should not be considering him for a different position. In an interview with Radio Fides, Quispe indicated that he would take the opportunity to take a break from politics, returning home to herd his goats "because goats are loyal." However, less than a month later, Quispe returned to work with the government, serving as director general of coordination with social movements. Quispe held that post until early October, when he was appointed to serve as vice minister of decolonization, a position he exercised for just under a month, resigning on 4 November to inaugurate his campaign headquarters with intent to contest the La Paz governorship.

== La Paz gubernatorial campaign ==
Quispe's gubernatorial aspirations stemmed as far back as 2014, when he unsuccessfully sought UN's support to contest the next year's election. Following his break with UN, Quispe began the process of structuring his own political organization. According to Quispe, while UN had some support in La Paz and El Alto, "the provinces have not yet been conquered." With that in mind, and in coordination with Santamaría, the indigenous legislator spent much of his time touring the department's rural areas with a view toward gaining support to seek the governorship. In an interview with El Alteño, Quispe affirmed that "renewal of leadership" would be a core feature of his political project, adding that "Indians cannot be on the sidelines." In late 2018, the Departmental Electoral Tribunal authorized the civic group Venceremos to participate in local elections. The group, led by Alteño Municipal Councillor Óscar Huanca, profiled himself for El Alto's mayoralty, with Quispe as a candidate for governor.

Logo of Quispe's Somos Pueblo.

By 2019, however, Quispe appeared to have moved away from Huanca, having instead founded his own political organization, Somos Pueblo. In March, he and Santamaría signed an alliance between Somos Pueblo and the MDS to support the presidential candidacy of Oscar Ortiz. When Ortiz's running mate, Edwin Rodríguez, withdrew from the race, Quispe was profiled as a potential replacement vice-presidential candidate, though ultimately, Deputy Shirley Franco got the nod. Instead, the MDS agreed to back Quispe's gubernatorial aspirations. In September, Quispe officially launched his La Paz gubernatorial campaign as part of Somos Pueblo Demócrata, an alliance legally registered by the MDS and New Social Option, a local political organization. However, the ensuing political crisis delayed the holding of subnational elections until new general elections could occur. In the interim, Quispe maintained his support for the MDS, aligning Somos Pueblo with Áñez's presidential campaign. Quispe's status as an Aymara indigenous ally of the transitional government led him to be again considered as a viable potential running mate, an idea pushed by CONAMAQ. Áñez eventually chose Doria Medina to accompany her on the ticket.

Following the October general elections, Quispe relaunched his gubernatorial campaign, joining forces with municipalist Iván Arias to form For the Common Good – Somos Pueblo (PBCSP), an alliance between their two political organizations. As both fronts lacked legal registration, PBCSP was sponsored by Suma Escoma, a small local organization, as well as the MDS. The pair jointly officialized their candidacies for mayor and governor, respectively, on 28 December. Quispe's innovative campaign was unique in its incorporation of social media, including TikTok, as a factor in its electoral strategy. The candidate rejected political pamphleteering as "the work of old politicians," gearing his social media campaign towards younger and urban sectors of the population, considering them to be the "hidden vote of the middle class." Conversely, Quispe's ground campaign brought him to many of the department's more rural areas, where he made use of his Aymara language proficiency to put forth a series of policy proposals aimed at aiding local indigenous peoples, a group he considered largely "abandoned."

Midway through the campaign, Quispe faced a reactivation in the process against him opened by Felipa Huanca. In February, judicial authorities found him guilty of political harassment, sentencing him to two years in San Pedro prison. Quispe denounced the conviction as an act of political sabotage aimed at disqualifying his candidacy, with his lawyer, Eduardo León, stating that he had observed "obvious" pressure from the government. Despite the sentence, Quispe's candidacy—and continued freedom—was spared pending appeal.

Ultimately, Quispe failed to attain enough votes to challenge the MAS in the second round, exiting third following the election with 22.44 percent of the popular vote, trailing behind Santos Quispe and Franklin Flores. Following the election, Quispe refused to back either of the winning candidates, considering both Flores and Quispe to be effectively "the same," for which he expressed his intent to vote null. On election day, Quispe posted a picture of his ballot, displaying that he had drawn in an extra box for himself, for whom he cast his vote. Following the election, Quispe announced his intent to retire from politics, assuring that his political cycle had concluded.

== Ideology and personal life ==
Quispe has defined himself as a figure without political origins, "neither left nor right [nor] center." An opponent of both capitalism and socialism—which he described as effectively "the same" for their "extractive, consumerist, [and] developmentalist" principals—Quispe has advocated for an indigenous communitarian development model. He has promoted moving the country's economy away from its dependence on extractive industries, supporting a push towards clean energy within the framework of "respect for our Pachamama." In 2010, he lobbied the government to replace the Ministry of Environment and Water with a "Ministry of Pachamama," stating that it was the "only way to defend the rights of [Mother Earth]."

As with most modern Aymara, Quispe practices a syncretic form of Christianity infused with Aymara indigenous beliefs. He has expressed faith in both God and Pachamama, stating that "leaving the house, we pray to God, but at the moment when you pass a large mountain ... we pray to Pachamama." In one viral instance, Quispe famously stated: "I fear only God... and my wife." Quispe is married to Rocío Patty, with whom he has lived in El Alto for over twenty years, together with their two children. According to Quispe, it was his wife who kept their family afloat during his tenure in CONAMAQ, while he continued to make an income working as a service driver during that time. He has criticized political leaders for leaving public office much richer than when they entered. Quispe has also been noted for his connection to El Alto's nightclub scene, having previously led the Association of Bars, Canteens, and Restaurants of El Alto. In 2015, Deputy María Eugenia Calcina accused him of being the owner of a network of bars and brothels in the city, a concept Quispe vehemently rejected as a politically motivated attack against his character.

== Electoral history ==
Electoral history of Rafael Quispe
Year	Office	Party	Alliance	Votes			Result	Ref.
Year	Office	Party	Alliance	Total	%	P.	Result	Ref.
2014	Deputy	Independent	Democratic Unity	215,360	14.75%	2nd	Lost	(Note: Presented on an electoral list. The data shown represents the share of the vote the entire party/alliance received in that constituency.)
2021	Governor	Somos Pueblo	PBC-SP	349,384	22.44%	3rd	Lost	
Source: Plurinational Electoral Organ | Electoral Atlas

Chamber of Deputies of Bolivia
Preceded by Lidia Paucara	Substitute Member of the Chamber of Deputies from La Paz; 2015–2019	Succeeded by Luis Fernando Zegarra
Government offices
Preceded by Braulio Yucra	General Executive Director of the Indigenous Development Fund; 2019–2020	Succeeded by Fernando Vargas
Preceded by Leonardo Montaño	Vice Minister of Decolonization; 2020	Succeeded by Pelagio Condori
