= 2021 La Paz gubernatorial election =

Bolivian election

← 2015	7 March 2021 (first round); 11 April 2021 (second round)	2026 →

Governor, all 45 seats in the Legislative Assembly (Note: Five reserved seats appointed or elected by native indigenous authorities in accordance with usos y costumbres.) 23 seats needed for a majority
- Opinion polls
- Registered: 1,950,428 (Note: Reduced to 1,947,828 in second round.)
- Turnout: 88.37% (▼0.13 pp) (Note: Reduced to 83.23% in second round.)
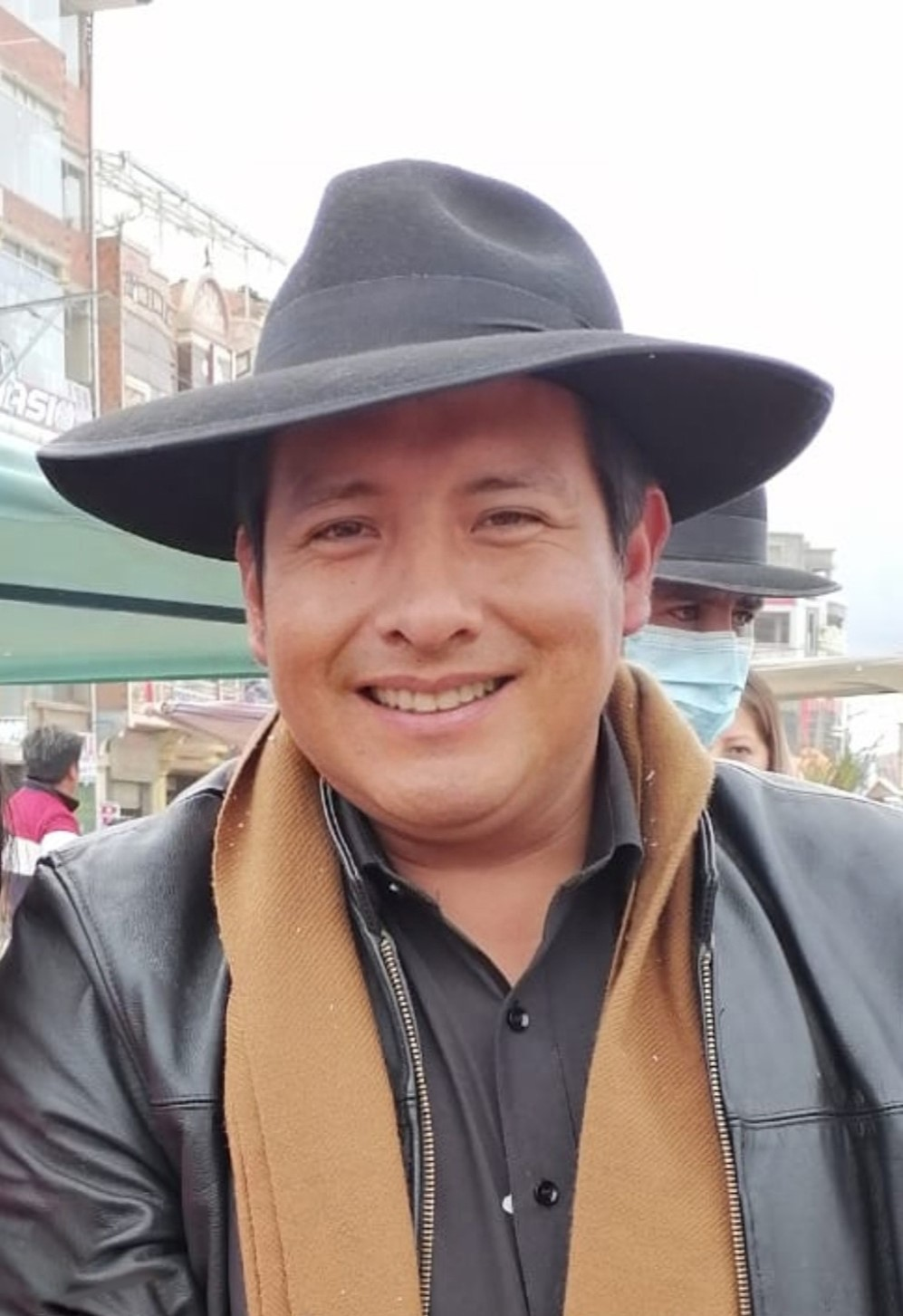

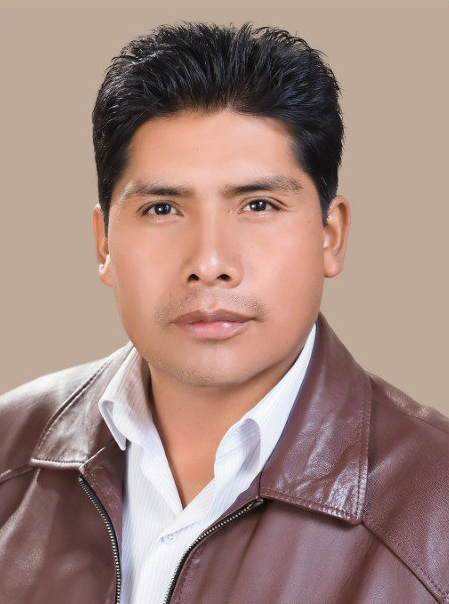

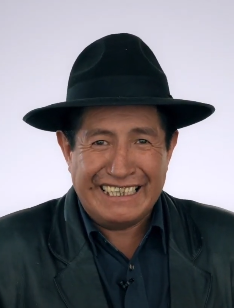

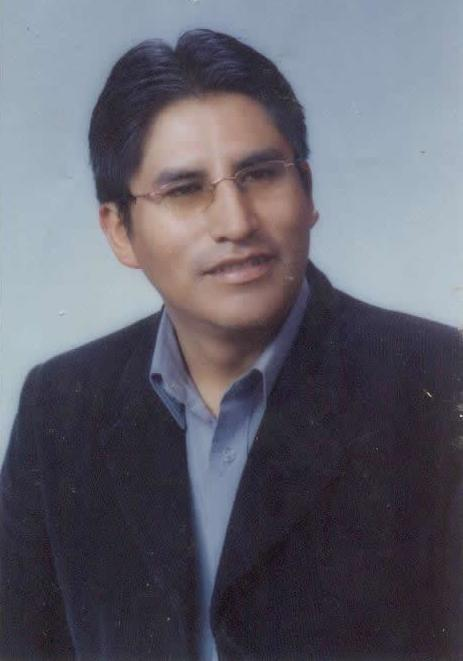
	First party	Second party
Candidate	Santos Quispe	Franklin Flores
Leader	Leopoldo Chui	Evo Morales
Party	APU	MAS-IPSP
Alliance	J.A.LLALLA.L.P.	—
Last election	New party	25 seats, 30.68%
Seats won	8	25
First round	392,132	618,221
Percentage	25.18%	39.70%
Runoff	831,816	674,220
Percentage	55.23%	44.77%
	Third party	Fourth party
Candidate	Rafael Quispe	Félix Patzi
Party	SP	MTS
Alliance	PBCSP (Note: Coalition between For the Common Good and Somos Pueblo, legally registered by the Social Democratic Movement and Suma Escoma.)	—
Last election	New alliance	New party
Seats won	5	1
First round	349,384	67,948
Percentage	22.44%	4.36%
Runoff	Eliminated	Eliminated
Governor before election
Félix Patzi
MTS
Governor after election
Santos Quispe
APU

The 2021 La Paz gubernatorial election was held on Sunday, 7 March 2021, with a runoff taking place on 11 April 2021, involving separate contests for governor and all forty-five seats in the Departmental Legislative Assembly. Incumbent governor Félix Patzi unsuccessfully sought reelection to a second term, finishing in fourth place with 4.36 percent of the popular vote. The election was won by Jallalla La Paz's Santos Quispe, who attained 55.23 percent of the vote in the second round, defeating Franklin Flores of the Movement for Socialism. On the legislative ballot, the Movement for Socialism won sixteen of the twenty provincial circumscriptions and nine of the twenty party-list seats, retaining its twenty-five seat majority in the Legislative Assembly.

Originally scheduled to take place in early 2020, this and other subnational elections were delayed by over a year as a result of the country's 2019 political crisis and the ongoing effects of the COVID-19 pandemic. The continued health crisis had a significant impact on the race, knocking out popular frontrunner Felipe Quispe and establishing a close contest between his son, Santos, and ruling party candidate Flores, trailed by Rafael Quispe, incumbent Patzi, and almost a dozen other candidates. Amid shifting demographics, this election was also noted for the fact that El Alto and the indigenous-majority provinces now held more electoral weight than the city of La Paz, a change reflected by the primarily indigenous identification of the candidates running.

== Background and electoral system ==
In the 2015 gubernatorial election, former minister of education Félix Patzi of the Third System Movement (MTS), running in alliance with Sovereignty and Liberty (SOL.bo), successfully won the governorship in the first round by a margin of 50.09 percent of the popular vote to his closest competitor's 30.68 percent, dislodging the ruling Movement for Socialism (MAS-IPSP) from power. Despite its defeat in the governorship, the MAS retained its effective majority in the Departmental Legislative Assembly. As with other departmental, provincial, and municipal elected officials, Patzi and the Legislative Assembly's set term of office was due to expire in mid-2020, completing a five-year mandate started in 2015. However, due to the annulment of the 2019 general election results as an outcome of that year's political crisis, the terms of all subnational authorities were extended until after new national elections had taken place.

The Supreme Electoral Tribunal (TSE) issued the call for subnational elections on 10 November 2020, scheduling them to be held on 7 March 2021. Individuals aged 18 by the election date or who had recently changed residency could register to vote between 3 and 17 December. 28 December was set as the deadline for political organizations to register their candidacies. For all nine autonomous departments, the electoral system has been in continuous use since 2010, involving separate contests for governor as the executive authority and all seats in the legislative body, known as the Departmental Legislative Assembly. All governorships are elected by a simple majority in a two-round system, with the top two candidates moving to a runoff if none of the contending parties attains fifty percent of the vote. Additionally, a second round may be avoided if one candidate achieves a forty percent plurality with ten percent more votes than the next closest competitor.

Twenty seats in the Legislative Assembly are elected in provincial single-member circumscriptions (assembly members by territory), while the other twenty are elected on an electoral list in a single department-wide party-list circumscription (assembly members by population), allocated proportionally using the D'Hondt method. The remaining five seats are reserved for the department's indigenous nations, appointed or elected by indigenous authorities in accordance with usos y costumbres.

== Candidates and campaigns ==
=== Jallalla La Paz ===
In mid-November, Felipe Quispe, popularly known as "El Mallku", launched his gubernatorial candidacy. The former guerilla and trade union leader had previously contested 2015's gubernatorial race on behalf of the Movement for Sovereignty (MPS), which this time opted to run university professor Federico Zelada as its candidate. Though Quispe was a member of his own front, Forward United People (APU)—led by his son, Santos Quispe—the party lacked legal registration, leading him to seek out an authorized organization willing to lend him its acronym. In December, Santos Quispe sealed an alliance between APU and Jallalla La Paz of Leopoldo Chui, which agreed to nominate his father as its candidate.

Quispe quickly established himself as an early frontrunner in the opening weeks of the campaign, with Ciesmori's first opinion poll published in late January giving him a quarter of the popular vote, trailed by a multitude of opposing candidates. By the time that poll was released, however, Quispe's prospects of attaining the governorship had been severely hampered, given that he was dead, having suffered from cardiac arrest a week prior. The Mallku's demise immediately put into question the electoral future of Jallalla, which was forced to seek an alternative candidate. Within a day of Quispe's death, his son, Santos, moved to "inherit" his father's candidacy, with APU's leadership announcing that it had selected him as the party's new nominee. Jallalla formally accepted the change on 2 February, following a meeting between representatives from all seventy-eight municipalities in which the organization had a presence.

=== Movement for Socialism ===
Within the Movement for Socialism, the candidate selection process operates under the framework of pluralism. Local party branches and affiliated social organizations are tasked with selecting pre-candidates, who are then evaluated by the party's leadership. The official nomination is a choice made solely by party leaders, together with allied social organizations. Just two prominent political leaders were presented as pre-candidates for the nomination. The first was Franklin Flores, a former member of the Chamber of Deputies, who was proclaimed by several agrarian workers' unions in his home province of Aroma, in addition to receiving the support of the Túpac Katari Peasant Federation. The second was Beimar Calep Mamani, the outgoing mayor of Palos Blancos, who enjoyed support from the Federation of Intercultural Communities of La Paz as well as various agrarian unions in the north of the department.

Early into the internal primary process, Flores established himself as the favorite to win the nomination, enjoying the support of party leader Evo Morales. The former president announced that Flores had been designated as the MAS's candidate on 14 December, a position officialized two weeks later. According to Morales, Flores' selection had been reached "almost by consensus", a point denied by Mamani and the Intercultural Federation, with the former contending that Morales had been misinformed into believing that Flores was the only candidate in the running. The dispute led Página Siete to later describe Flores as having been "chosen by Evo", a point he denied, pointing out that over 2,000 local communities had backed him before he won Morales' endorsement.

=== Somos Pueblo ===
Of the major gubernatorial candidates, Rafael Quispe had been in the race the longest, having established himself as a contender years in advance. Quispe's gubernatorial aspirations stemmed as far back as 2014 when he unsuccessfully sought the National Unity Front's nomination to contest the 2015 gubernatorial election. Since then, the former deputy and former head of the Indigenous Development Fund had worked on structuring his own political organization, touring the department's rural areas with a view toward gaining support to seek the governorship. In late 2018, he joined Venceremos, a newly legally registered civic group led by El Alto Municipal Councillor Óscar Huanca. Reports at the time indicated that the group had selected Quispe as its gubernatorial candidate. By 2019, however, Quispe appeared to have moved away from Huanca, having instead founded his own political organization, Somos Pueblo. Venceremos, in turn, opted instead to nominate Juan Choque, Felipe Quispe's son-in-law, as its candidate.

Quispe formally launched his gubernatorial campaign in September 2019, signing an alliance between Somos Pueblo and the Social Democratic Movement (MDS) to form Somos Pueblo Demócrata, a coalition that also included New Social Option (NOS), a small local party. As a result of the year-long delay in holding subnational elections, Quispe shelved his plans, relaunching the campaign in early November 2020. For this run, Quispe joined forces with Iván Arias to form For the Common Good – Somos Pueblo (PBCSP), an alliance between their two political organizations. As both fronts lacked legal registration, the MDS again sponsored the alliance, joined this time by Suma Escoma. Arias and Quispe jointly officialized their candidacies for mayor and governor, respectively, on 28 December.

=== Third System Movement ===
For incumbent governor Félix Patzi—whose party, the MTS, had attained legal registration since becoming governor—the question of whether he would seek reelection remained pendant until the final weeks preceding candidate registration. Patzi's most recent electoral endeavor had been his 2019 bid for the presidency, in which he attained a meager 3.18 percent in his home department. In addition, Patzi's poor handling of the COVID-19 pandemic left much to be desired, leaving him vulnerable in a future second-term bid. Given these concerns, on 5 December, the MTS held a party conference to define whether or not Patzi would seek reelection. The meeting, attended by party partisans and allied social organizations, concluded that Patzi's reelection was "necessary" in order to continue the public works projects initiated during his first term.

=== Other political organizations ===
This election was noted for the high degree of indigenous representation on the ballot, with a majority of gubernatorial candidates being of some indigenous descent. According to analyst Marcelo Arequipa, the prevalence of indigenous candidates reflected the shifting voting demographics in the department. For the first time, the Aymara city of El Alto and not the capital of La Paz enjoyed a majority of registered voters, making it, together with the provinces, the key to winning the election. Apart from the top four contenders—all ethnic Aymara—indigenous candidates running with minor fronts included Beatriz Álvarez. A chola Aymara, Álvarez had served as a La Paz municipal councillor on behalf of Sovereignty and Liberty (SOL.bo), the party that nominated her to seek the governorship. Of the fourteen candidates, only Álvarez and one other individual—Assemblywoman Claudia Bravo of the National Unity Front (UN)—were women.

Other candidates included Franclin Gutiérrez, who was invited to run by the Front for Victory (FPV). The cocalero activist had led the Departmental Association of Coca Producers (ADEPCOCA) and was noted for having been arrested during the Morales administration, spending fifteen months in preventative detention on dubious charges that were dropped in 2019. On behalf of Civic Community — Autonomies (C-A), Samuel Sea was presented as a candidate for the governorship. In the 2020 elections, Sea had been a candidate for deputy in La Paz's circumscription 16 and was the alliance's coordinator in the provinces. As with Felipe Quispe, Sea's candidacy was cut short after he died from complications related to COVID-19. Sea was replaced on the ballot by Mateo Laura, who had previously governed La Paz as prefect—the precursor to governor—between 2002 and 2003.

== Opinion polling ==
Date(s)	Pollster	Client	S. Quispe	Flores	R. Quispe	Patzi	Gutiérrez	Álvarez	Bravo	Choque	Calle	C-A (Note: Ciesmori 2–4: Mateo Laura Focaliza 1–2: Mateo Laura Ciesmori 1: Samuel Sea)	Tito	O. Quispe	Zelada	Quenta	None	Lead
7 Mar (Note: Exit poll.)	Cisemori	UNITEL	27.1%	37.3%	22.1%	5.4%	1.3%	1.9%	0.9%	1.0%	0.5%	0.5%	0.4%	0.8%	0.5%	0.3%	N/A	10.2%
7 Mar	Focaliza	Bolivisión	24.9%	37.7%	20.5%	3.4%	0.8%	1.9%	0.6%	1.1%	0.3%	0.3%	0.8%	1.5%	0.2%	0.3%	5.6% (Note: Blank/None: 2% Null: 1.1% Secret: 2.5%)	12.8%
25 Feb	Ciesmori	UNITEL	17.0%	23.3%	16.7%	4.7%	1.6%	0.9%	0.5%	0.5%	0.6%	0.8%	0.1%	0.1%	0.1%	0.0%	33.1% (Note: Blank/None: 6.2% Null: 1% Undecided: 25.9%)	6.3%
21 Feb	Focaliza	Bolivisión	17.4%	21.2%	16.5%	10.2%	2.7%	0.3%	0.3%	0.4%	0.2%	0.2%	0.0%	0.1%	0.1%	0.1%	30.4% (Note: Blank/None: 9.5% Null: 2.6% Undecided: 18.3%)	3.8%
11 Feb	Ciesmori	UNITEL	18.4%	21.3%	14.9%	9.3%	2.7%	0.9%	0.6%	0.5%	N/A	1.9%	0.2%	0.6%	0.2%	0.0%	28.3% (Note: Blank/None: 8.5% Null: 1.7% Undecided: 18.1%)	2.9%
24 Jan	Ciesmori	UNITEL	25.0% (Note: Felipe Quispe.)	15.1%	10.8%	10.1%	3.7%	1.6%	0.8%	0.6%	N/A	1.7%	N/A	0.3%	N/A	0.3%	30.0% (Note: Blank/None: 7.1% Null: 2.4% Undecided: 20.5%)	9.9%

== Results ==
=== Gubernatorial ===
The death of Felipe Quispe significantly shifted the competitive nature of the campaign. Speaking to Página Siete, Rafael Quispe predicted that the Mallku's departure would serve to aid the candidates in second and third place; that is, Flores and himself. "The MAS supporters who were going to vote for the Mallku will return to the MAS, and the people who were going to vote for the Mallku because he was against the MAS will return to Rafael", Quispe stated. By 11 February, Ciesmori's second opinion poll found that the "posthumous vote" had not significantly carried over to Santos Quispe, who moved down to second place, putting Flores in the lead. Flores maintained his slight edger over the opposition candidates for the remainder of the race, though not by a high enough percentage to circumvent a runoff, even when calculating the results without taking the undecided and null vote into account.

By election night, however, exit polling conducted by Ciesmori and Focaliza indicated a surge in MAS support, granting Flores nearly forty percent of the vote with an over ten-point lead above his closest competitor. The margin was substantial enough for Red UNO to call the race for Flores, believing that with the remaining votes, he would be able to avoid a second round. With that, Flores himself declared victory, as did Morales. For his part, Santos Quispe decried fraud, alleging irregularities in the vote counting process, for which his supporters installed vigils outside the Departmental Electoral Tribunal (TED)'s facilities. In the ensuing days, the ongoing vote count narrowed the race, placing Flores' victory in uncertainty. A week after the election, the TED released its final tabulation, giving Flores 39.7 percent of the first round vote, leaving him just three-tenths of a percent shy of winning the governorship outright and setting off a runoff in the department.

With the second round underway, both Flores and Quispe went about shoring up their bases of support in the department, with Flores seeking to solidify the MAS vote in the provinces while Quispe campaigned in the capital. Both contenders also sought out alliances with other parties, with Flores attaining the support of the Bolivian National Action Party (PAN-BOL) and, more importantly, the MTS of outgoing governor Félix Patzi. According to analysts, Flores' main obstacle in reaching the governorship was surviving the vote in the city of La Paz, the only municipality that had not been won by either of the top two contenders, having lent its support to Rafael Quispe. For his part, Quispe expressed his dissatisfaction with both candidates, considering them "the same" and announcing his intent to vote null. His party, Somos Pueblo, similarly refused to endorse either the MAS or JALLALLA, encouraging supporters to make their own choice. For columnist José Luis Quiroga, Flores' chances of winning relied on whether voters in the capital switched their support to Santos Quispe—which was not a given—or opted instead to sit out the runoff.

Ultimately, a majority of voters in the second round broke for Quispe, who defeated Flores by a margin of 55.23 percent to Flores' 44.77. Though voting was repeated on 25 April at four polling centers in El Alto and La Paz, the results, constituting 00.04 percent of the total vote, did not sway the election.

Candidate	Party	First round		Second round	
Candidate	Party	Votes	%	Votes	%
Santos Quispe	Jallalla La Paz	392,132	25.18	831,816	55.23
Franklin Flores	Movement for Socialism	618,221	39.70	674,220	44.77
Rafael Quispe	For the Common Good – Somos Pueblo	349,384	22.44		
Félix Patzi	Third System Movement	67,948	4.36		
Franclin Gutiérrez	Front for Victory	23,517	1.51		
Beatriz Álvarez	Sovereignty and Liberty	22,626	1.45		
Claudia Bravo	National Unity Front	21,331	1.37		
Juan Choque	Venceremos	16,314	1.05		
Rufo Calle	Christian Democratic Party	11,033	0.71		
Mateo Laura	Civic Community – Autonomies	8,578	0.55		
Julio Tito	Patriotic Social Alliance	7,944	0.51		
Orlando Quispe	Bolivian National Action Party	6,886	0.44		
Federico Zelada	Movement for Sovereignty	6,269	0.40		
Santiago Quenta	For my La Paz – United Invincible (Note: Coalition between Libre 21 and the Revolutionary Nationalist Movement.)	5,025	0.32		
Total		1,557,208	100.00	1,506,036	100.00
Valid votes		1,557,208	90.35	1,506,036	92.90
Invalid/blank votes		166,378	9.65	115,092	7.10
Total votes		1,723,586	100.00	1,621,128	100.00
Registered voters/turnout		1,950,428	88.37	1,947,828	83.23
Source: Plurinational Electoral Organ | Electoral Atlas

=== Legislative Assembly ===
Composition of the Legislative Assembly following the election.

Legislative results by single-member district (left) and party-list (right).

Party	Party-list seats			Single-member seats			Total seats
Party	Votes	%	Seats	Votes	%	Seats	Total seats
Movement for Socialism	420,265	39.48	9	500,145	40.50	16	25
Jallalla La Paz	258,733	24.31	6	284,501	23.04	2	8
For the Common Good – Somos Pueblo	222,170	20.87	5	250,750	20.30	–	5
Third System Movement	34,745	3.26	–	55,800	4.52	1	1
Sovereignty and Liberty	27,650	2.60	–	25,858	2.09	1	1
Venceremos	20,380	1.91	–	26,385	2.14	–	–
National Unity Front	17,558	1.65	–	11,560	0.94	–	–
Civic Community – Autonomies	12,262	1.15	–	26,154	2.12	–	–
Front for Victory	11,945	1.12	–	10,714	0.87	–	–
Patriotic Social Alliance	11,192	1.05	–	15,371	1.24	–	–
Movement for Sovereignty	9,314	0.88	–	17,076	1.38	–	–
Christian Democratic Party	6,326	0.59	–	139	0.01	–	–
Bolivian National Action Party	5,512	0.52	–	6,674	0.54	–	–
For my La Paz – United Invincible	6,402	0.60	–	3,917	0.32	–	–
Indigenous seats							5
Total	1,064,454	100.00	20	1,235,044	100.00	20	45
Valid votes	1,064,454	61.83		1,235,044	71.68		
Invalid/blank votes	657,015	38.17		487,988	28.32		
Total votes	1,721,469	100.00		1,723,032	100.00		
Registered voters/turnout	1,950,428	88.26		1,950,428	88.34		
Source: Plurinational Electoral Organ | Electoral Atlas

== Aftermath ==
Quispe was formally accredited as governor-elect by the TED on 28 April, and within hours of receiving his credentials, broke his pact with Jallalla, announcing his intent to solidify APU as a political force. Quispe's actions led Chui to denounce him as a "traitor," and the governor was formally expelled from Jallalla on 10 May, seven days after his formal inauguration. The dispute precipitated a fraught tenure for Quispe, whose term was marked by a series of controversies, kicking off within his first few months in office. By mid-2023, mounting scandals, including an arrest for public intoxication and an investigation into rape allegations, among others, had caused the governor's public approval to plummet, with multiple fronts actively soliciting a recall referendum again him.
