= Martín Quispe =

Bolivian politician (born 1959)

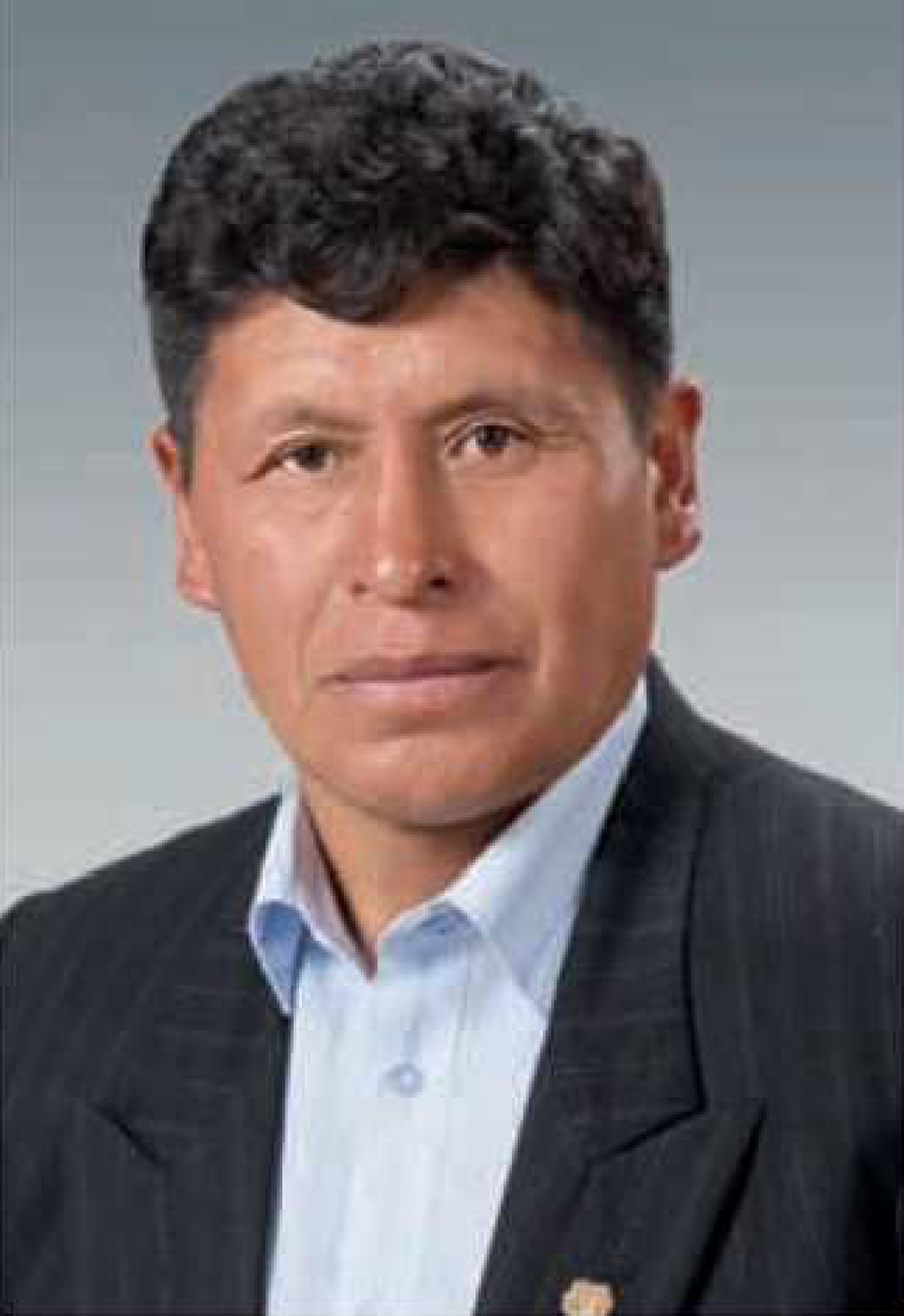
- Official portrait, 2014

Member of the Chamber of Deputies from La Paz circumscription 21
- In office 19 January 2010 – 18 January 2015
- Substitute: María Tupa
- Preceded by: Gualberto Choque
- Succeeded by: Franklin Flores (Note: Redistribution; circumscription 18.)
- Constituency: Aroma; Loayza; Villarroel

Personal details
- Born: Martín Quispe Julián; 10 June 1959 (age 67) Calamarca, La Paz, Bolivia
- Party: Movement for Socialism
- Education: Warisata Normal School
- Occupation: Educator; politician

Martín Quispe Julián (born 10 June 1959) is a Bolivian educator, politician, and trade unionist who served as a member of the Chamber of Deputies from La Paz, representing circumscription 21 from 2010 to 2015.

Born in the Calamarca Municipality, Quispe spent his early career as a schoolteacher before pivoting to broadcast radio. Around 1996, he returned to his home Aroma Province, where he held positions of leadership within both his indigenous community in the area's trade unions.

A member of the Movement for Socialism, Quispe served within the party's provincial and departmental affiliates until 2009, when he was elected to the Chamber of Deputies. Quispe's ninety percent victory was the highest margin achieved by any candidate running in single-member constituencies that cycle. He was not nominated for reelection.

== Early life and career ==
Martín Quispe was born on 10 June 1959 in Calamarca, a rural municipality in the Aroma Province of southern La Paz; the son of Justino Quispe and Emeteria Julián. As a young adult, Quispe initially pursued a career in education, attending the Warisata Normal School, where he graduated as a professor. After a few short stints spent teaching at the Agua Rica and later Bella Vista schools throughout the mid to late 1980s, Quispe retired from that profession. He returned to school and received a degree in communication sciences in 1992, spending the next few years working in AM and FM radio.

In the mid-1990s, Quispe resettled in Calamarca, where he assumed positions of traditional leadership within his home canton of Cosmini, including serving as the area's mallku in 1996. That same year, he began participating in the area's trade syndicates, serving as general secretary of his local farmers' union before being elected to lead Calamarca's workers' center the following year.

== Chamber of Deputies ==
=== Election ===
An early adherent of the Movement for Socialism (MAS-IPSP), Quispe first joined the party's Cosmini affiliate in 1998. The MAS nominated him as its Calamarca mayoral candidate the following year, but he took home just thirty-two votes.^{[§]} In subsequent years, Quispe remained off the ballot but continued to progressively rise through the ranks of the MAS's internal structure. In 2002, he was made a member of the party's provincial transparency committee, and in 2007, he became its departmental secretary of international relations, the third highest-ranking position within the MAS's La Paz affiliate.

In 2009, ten years after his 1999 loss, Quispe was nominated for a seat in the Chamber of Deputies. He campaigned in southern La Paz's circumscription 21, encompassing his home Aroma Province, as well the neighboring Loayza and Villarroel provinces. Quispe won by a landslide, attaining ninety percent of the popular vote,^{[§]} the highest margin for any candidate running in single-member constituencies that cycle. In a race where the second-place candidate won less than five percent of the vote,^{[§]} Quispe's only contender was the plethora of spoilt ballots, which, when included, drop his margin to 68.2 percent. According to sociologist Salvador Romero, the high propensity of abstentions responded to a "certain indifference on the part of the electorate towards candidates who are expected to win, and about whom little is known."

=== Tenure ===
Quispe's parliamentary tenure was split between two committees; he spent the first three years of his term on the lower chamber's Environment Committee, later switching to the Social Welfare Committee in his closing two years.^{[§]} In these positions, Quispe's work focused on tackling mental health; he drafted a bill in the Chamber of Deputies on the subject and presented a similar proposal to the Latin American Parliament in his capacity as a delegate to it. Outside of legislation, Quispe's tenure was marked by scandal over allegations that he used his influence to procure the release from prison of Yesid Luín, the mayor of Calamarca. Luín had been arrested in 2011 after being caught smuggling cocaine in his car. His subsequent release and restoration to the position of mayor was controversial, with a lengthy criminal process against himself, Quispe, and others going on into 2015 and beyond.

=== Commission assignments ===
- Social Policy Commission
  - Social Welfare and Protection Committee (2013–2015)
- Amazon Region, Land, Territory, Water, Natural Resources, and Environment Commission
  - Environment, Climate Change, Protected Areas, and Forest Resources Committee (2010–2013)

== Electoral history ==
Electoral history of Martín Quispe
Year	Office	Party	Votes			Result	Ref.
Year	Office	Party	Total	%	P.	Result	Ref.
1999	Mayor	Movement for Socialism	32	1.24%	8th	Lost	
2009	Deputy	Movement for Socialism	43,239	90.07%	1st	Won	
Source: Plurinational Electoral Organ | Electoral Atlas

Chamber of Deputies of Bolivia
Preceded by Gualberto Choque	Member of the Chamber of Deputies from La Paz circumscription 21; 2010–2015	Succeeded by Franklin Flores
