= Franklin Flores =

Bolivian politician (born 1979)

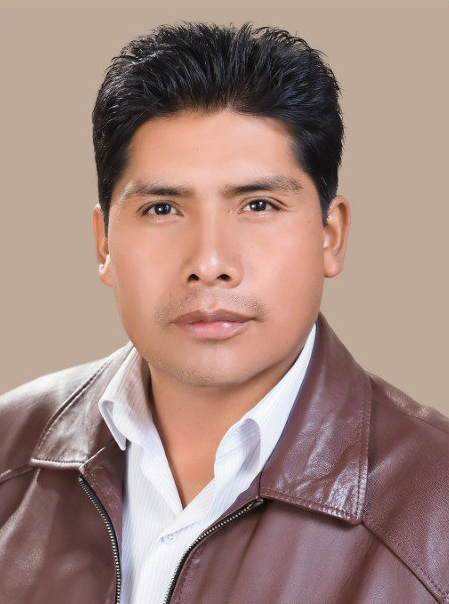
- Official portrait, 2019

General Manager of the Food Production Support Enterprise
- Incumbent
- Assumed office 26 May 2021
- President: Luis Arce
- Minister: Néstor Huanca
- Preceded by: Marvin Pereira

Member of the Chamber of Deputies from La Paz circumscription 18
- In office 18 January 2015 – 3 November 2020
- Substitute: Asunta Quispe
- Preceded by: Martín Quispe (Note: Redistribution; circumscription 21.)
- Succeeded by: Basilia Rojas
- Constituency: Aroma; Loayza; Murillo; Villarroel

Personal details
- Born: Franklin Richar Flores Córdova; 8 July 1979 (age 47) Aisacollo, La Paz, Bolivia
- Party: Movement for Socialism
- Education: Higher University of San Andrés
- Occupation: Politician; trade unionist

Franklin Richar Flores Córdova (born 8 July 1979) is a Bolivian politician, trade unionist, and former student leader serving as general manager of the Food Production Support Enterprise since 2021. A member of the Movement for Socialism, he previously served as a member of the Chamber of Deputies from La Paz, representing circumscription 18 from 2015 to 2020. Before that, he served as a Sica Sica municipal councillor from 2010 to 2014, during which time he held office as the body's president. In 2021, Flores was his party's candidate for governor of La Paz, placing second in that year's gubernatorial election.

== Early life and career ==
An ethnic Aymara, Franklin Flores was born on 8 July 1979 in the Sica Sica Municipality of La Paz. He completed primary studies at a small rural school in the Aisacollo community, graduating high school in Konani before moving to La Paz in 1997, where he attended the city's American Institute. Flores studied law at the Higher University of San Andrés (UMSA), though it is unclear whether he completed his degree. During his time at the university, Flores rose through the ranks of students' union leadership, serving as executive secretary of the UMSA Faculty of Law Student Center. Returning to Sica Sica, he became active in various trade union organizations in and around the Aroma Province.

Flores's union activity led him to join the ranks of the ruling Movement for Socialism (MAS-IPSP), a party with which he sought his first elective position. In the 2010 municipal elections, Flores headed the MAS's electoral list of councillors in the Sica Sica Municipality, winning the seat for the party. Throughout his term, Flores served as president of the Sica Sica Municipal Council, attaining the support of the legislature's MAS majority to hold the post five consecutive times between 2010 and 2014.

== Chamber of Deputies ==
=== Election ===
Nearing the end of his term, Flores resigned from office to run for a seat in the Chamber of Deputies. The MAS postulated him in the rural circumscription 18, a constituency encompassing the Aroma, Loayza, and Villarroel provinces, as well as segments of Murillo Province. During the campaign, Flores was involved in a minor scandal after the municipal vehicle he was driving collided at high speeds with a white minibus, leaving four injured, including himself. Following the accident, Flores allegedly abandoned the van, leaving his unlicensed nephew as the driver. Despite the incident, Flores went on to win the election with 84.60 percent of the vote. The landslide victory, according to sociologist Salvador Romero, owed to the MAS's overwhelmingly hegemonic position in the rural highlands, where "parliamentary campaigns are symbolic" and victory is assured "regardless of the candidates nominated".

=== Tenure ===
During his tenure in the Chamber of Deputies, Flores established himself as a close ally of President Evo Morales, the ruling party's top leader. When Morales controversially presented his resignation in 2019, Flores led the bloc of Morales loyalists that sought to reject its approval in the Legislative Assembly. Amid shouts and protests, Flores attempted to present a motion of prior consideration in a bid to stall a vote on the topic. However, he failed to gain the legally necessary support of five other legislators to pass the motion. Morales's resignation was formally approved on 21 January 2020—two months after he had already left office—by a majority of those present, including a majority of the MAS caucus. Arguments between opposing MAS legislators continued after the session, with Flores accusing Senator Omar Aguilar of manipulating the vote count.

==== Commission assignments ====
- Plural Justice, Prosecutor's Office, and Legal Defense of the State Commission
  - Ordinary Jurisdiction and Magistracy Council Committee (2015–2016)
- Constitution, Legislation, and Electoral System Commission
  - Constitutional Development and Legislation Committee (2016–2017)
- Government, Defense, and Armed Forces Commission (President: 2017–2018)
- Plural Economy, Production, and Industry Commission (President: 2018–2019)
- Education and Health Commission (President: 2019–2020)

== La Paz gubernatorial campaign ==
Shortly after the conclusion of his term in the Legislative Assembly, Flores profiled himself as a contender for the La Paz governorship. In early November, several agrarian workers' unions in Flores's home province of Aroma proclaimed him as their pre-candidate for the MAS's nomination, a position officialized thanks to the support of the Túpac Katari Peasant Federation. From then on, Flores quickly established himself as the favorite to win the internal primary, facing only one other pre-candidate, Beimar Calep Mamani, the outgoing mayor of Palos Blancos. His position as the MAS's gubernatorial nominee was made official on 27 December, with Morales stating that he had been chosen "almost by consensus". This claim faced pushback by sectors supporting Mamani, leading Página Siete to later describe Flores as having been "chosen by Evo", an allegation he denied, pointing out that over 2,000 local communities had backed him before he won Morales's endorsement.

Gubernatorial results in the first (left) and second (right) rounds.

Throughout the campaign season, Flores enjoyed a slight lead in opinion polling, a fact aided by the death of Felipe Quispe—the original frontrunner—midway through the race. By election night, exit polling conducted by Ciesmori and Focaliza indicated that Flores had attained nearly forty percent of the vote, an over ten-point lead above his closest competitor. The margin was substantial enough for Red UNO to call the race for Flores, believing that with the remaining votes, he would be able to circumvent a runoff. (Note: In Bolivia, a second round is avoided by one candidate either reaching fifty percent of the vote or achieving a plurality with ten percent more votes than the next closest competitor.) With that, Flores declared victory. However, as the race narrowed, the final count ultimately gave him 39.7 percent of the vote, leaving him just three tenths of a percent shy of winning the governorship outright.

With the second round underway, Flores focused his efforts on solidifying his support in the provinces, enlisting the help of the MAS's newly elected mayors to serve as his campaign managers in their respective municipalities. According to analysts, Flores's main challenge was surviving the vote in the capital, where a majority of the electorate had not voted for either of the top two contenders. For columnist José Luis Quiroga, Flores's chances of winning relied on whether or not voters in the city of La Paz switched their support to his challenger, Santos Quispe, or opted instead to sit out the runoff. Ultimately, a majority of votes broke for Quispe, who defeated Flores by a margin of 55.23 percent to Flores's 44.77.

== Food Production Support Enterprise ==
Just over a month after his gubernatorial defeat, Flores was appointed to serve as general manager of the state-owned Food Production Support Enterprise (EMAPA). Flores's designation faced pushback from agricultural producers, who criticized his lack of experience in the sector. Speaking to Bloomberg Línea, Luis Fernando Chávez stated that "EMAPA should be managed by a food engineer, by an agronomist, by some experienced agricultural leader, but not by a politician who has never known ... [how to] guarantee food production". Chávez considered Flores's designation to have been the product of political favoritism.

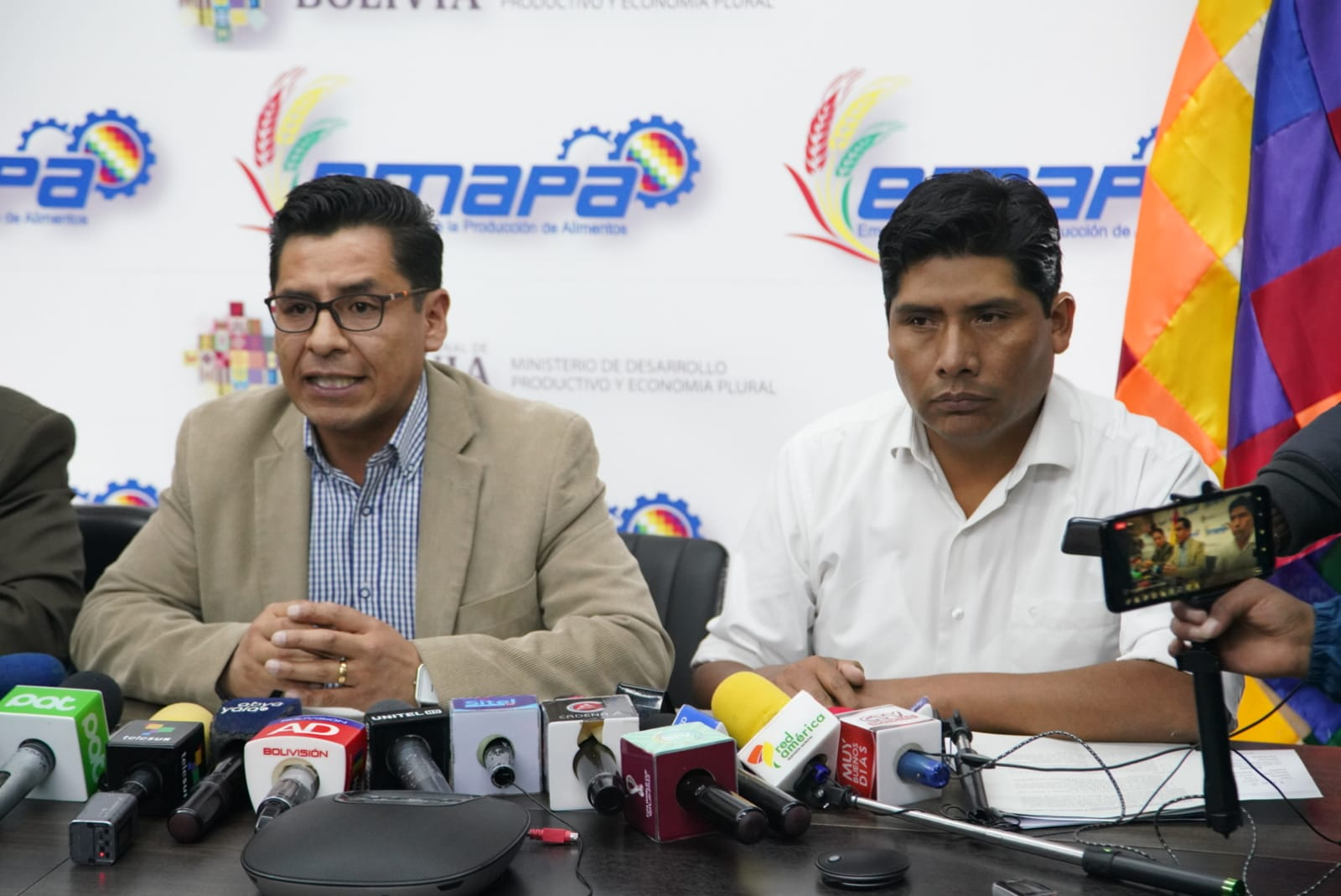
Flores delivers a press conference on the supply of meat.

A year into his term, Flores's administration faced protests from producers in Santa Cruz's Integrated North region, who denounced that EMAPA was illegally transporting and storing transgenic corn. Save for soybeans, the use of genetically modified seeds is strictly prohibited by Bolivian law, a regulation producers in the region had for years requested be repealed so as to increase crop yields and ward off pests. The government, however, had historically refused, considering transgenics unsuitable for human consumption and harmful to the environment. As such, when complaints arose that EMAPA had been transporting and storing genetically modified corn, local producers protested the lack of equal enforcement of the law. "Here, if someone dares to produce transgenic corn, they threaten us with prosecutors and with taking our land, but for those over there on the border, there is no control", complained Eliazer Arellano, leader of the North Group Producers Association.

In July, disgruntled producers blockaded the highway connecting Montero to San Pedro, where access to EMAPA's storage silos was also blocked off. There, local farmers carried out tests on corn samples taken from ten different transport vehicles, alleging that they had all come out positive as transgenic. On the fifteenth, Flores and other ruling party officials met with Arellano and representatives of the National Association of Oilseed Producers to negotiate an agreement. The five-point deal saw producers end their blockades while EMAPA pledged to take action against the illegal importation of transgenic seeds, among other concessions. However, the agreement fell through within the day, with Arellano accusing Flores of having "escaped" along with the transport trucks, contravening EMAPA's promise to allow producers to carry out a final sampling of the questioned corn. Five days later, Flores announced that EMAPA had completed its own examination, assuring that all observed produce had tested negative for transgenics. Arellano, in turn, accused Flores of being an "incapable manager" and demanded his resignation.

== Electoral history ==
Electoral history of Franklin Flores
Year	Office	Party	First round			Second round			Result	Ref.
Year	Office	Party	Votes	%	P.	Votes	%	P.	Result	Ref.
2010	Councillor	Movement for Socialism	2,670	41.19%	1st	None			Won	(Note: Presented on an electoral list. The data shown represents the share of the vote the entire party/alliance received in that constituency.)
2014	Deputy	Movement for Socialism	53,534	84.60%	1st	None			Won	
2021	Governor	Movement for Socialism	618,221	39.70%	1st	674,220	44.77%	2nd	Lost	
Source: Plurinational Electoral Organ | Electoral Atlas

Chamber of Deputies of Bolivia
Preceded by Martín Quispe	Member of the Chamber of Deputies from La Paz circumscription 18; 2015–2020	Succeeded by Basilia Rojas
Government offices
Preceded by Marvin Pereira	General Manager of the Food; Production Support Enterprise; 2021–present	Incumbent
