= Eliane Capobianco =

Bolivian politician (born 1973)

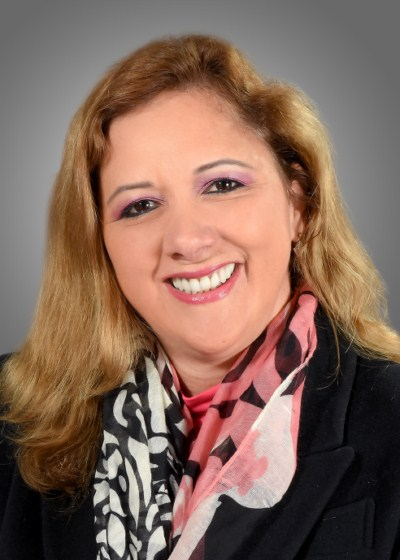
- Official portrait, 2017

Minister of Rural Development and Lands
- In office 28 January 2020 – 6 November 2020
- President: Jeanine Áñez
- Preceded by: Mauricio Ordoñez
- Succeeded by: Wilson Cáceres

Member of the Chamber of Deputies from Santa Cruz
- In office 18 January 2015 – 3 December 2019
- Substitute: José Carlos Gutiérrez
- Preceded by: Betty Tejada
- Succeeded by: Jordana Middagh
- Constituency: Party list

Constituent of the Constituent Assembly from Santa Cruz circumscription 51
- In office 6 August 2006 – 14 December 2007
- Constituency: Santa Cruz de la Sierra

Personal details
- Born: Beatriz Eliane Capobianco Sandoval; 15 April 1973 (age 53) São Paulo, Brazil
- Party: Social Democratic Movement (2014–present)
- Parents: Jorge Capobianco; Beatriz Sandoval
- Relatives: Guillermo Capobianco (uncle)
- Education: Gabriel René Moreno University (BSL)
- Occupation: Lawyer; politician

Beatriz Eliane Capobianco Sandoval (born 15 April 1973) is a Bolivian lawyer and politician who served as minister of rural development and lands from January to November 2020. A member of the Social Democratic Movement, she previously served as a party-list member of the Chamber of Deputies from Santa Cruz from 2015 to 2019 on behalf of the Democratic Unity coalition. Before that, she served as a member of the Constituent Assembly from Santa Cruz, representing circumscription 51 from 2006 to 2007 on behalf of the Social Democratic Power alliance. A professional in cadastre and land and real estate registration, Capobianco held numerous positions linked to Santa Cruz's agribusiness sector, including serving twice as departmental director of the National Institute of Agrarian Reform, first from 2001 to 2002 and again from 2019 to 2020.

== Early life and career ==
Eliane Capobianco was born on 15 April 1973 in São Paulo, Brazil. She was raised by an eminently political family with an extensive history in private and public affairs. Her father, Jorge Capobianco, served as president of the Santa Cruz Development Corporation, while her mother, Beatriz Sandoval, was a magistrate and dean of the Supreme Court of Justice. Her uncle, Guillermo Capobianco, was a founding member of the Revolutionary Left Movement, serving as minister of the interior in the administration of Jaime Paz Zamora. Capobianco studied law at Gabriel René Moreno Autonomous University, graduating with a degree in legal sciences. She later undertook postgraduate studies in Denmark, attaining a master's degree in cadastre and land and real estate registration. Her expertise in agrarian law led her to work as a university professor, teaching students at the Simón Bolívar Andean University and the Aquino University of Bolivia.

Throughout her career, Capobianco held key positions related to Santa Cruz's agribusiness sector. She worked as an advisor for the National Association of Oilseed Producers and the Federation of Ranchers of Santa Cruz, two of the most powerful agroindustrial business entities in the department. Between 2001 and 2002, Capobianco served as departmental director of the National Institute of Agrarian Reform (INRA), a position of particular import in Santa Cruz, the country's primary agricultural region. Capobianco's connections with Santa Cruz's business sector led her to become an early opponent of the government of Evo Morales, whose land reform policies stood against the interests of the department's major landowners.

== Constituent Assembly ==
Capobianco entered the political scene in 2006, participating in that year's Constituent Assembly elections as a candidate in circumscription 51, encompassing a portion of Santa Cruz de la Sierra, an opposition stronghold. Her candidacy was facilitated through the Social Democratic Power alliance, which sought to fill its ranks with political outsiders—typically young professionals with minimal previous party experience—as a means of challenging the rising primacy of the Movement for Socialism (MAS-IPSP). The jump from the private to public spheres was a common step amongst Cruceños in the business sector, reflecting the propensity of the department's agribusiness elites to occupy positions in public administration that granted them influence over land reform policy. Throughout her term, Capobianco served on the Land-Territory Subcommission, charged with drafting and debating articles precisely related to matters of agrarian and land reform.

== Chamber of Deputies ==
=== Election ===
Following her stint in the Constituent Assembly, Capobianco returned to Santa Cruz, where Governor Rubén Costas appointed her to serve as director of regional development. During this time, she became a component of the nascent Social Democratic Movement (MDS), a party that united regional opposition leaders into a single anti-MAS front. In the 2014 general elections, the MDS aligned itself with the National Unity Front, granting it control over the coalition's legislative ticket in Beni and Santa Cruz. As part of its strategy of nominating ex-legislators and political professionals to fill its electoral list, the MDS selected Capobianco to serve as a party-list member of the Chamber of Deputies.

=== Tenure ===
As with in the Constituent Assembly, Capobianco's term in the legislature focused its efforts on constructing policy relating to land distribution; she worked in the Territorial Organization of the State and Autonomies Commission and was a member of the Departmental Autonomies Committee. Upon the conclusion of her term, she sought reelection, topping the Bolivia Says No (BDN) alliance's electoral list in Santa Cruz. Capobianco did not retain her seat, owing to the electoral disaster BDN experienced in the 2019 elections, cushioned only by the later annulment of the results due to allegations of fraud. Following the election, Capobianco made a brief return to Santa Cruz as the newly appointed departmental director of INRA, reassuming the position after seventeen years.

=== Commission assignments ===
- Territorial Organization of the State and Autonomies Commission
  - Departmental Autonomies Committee (2015–2016, 2018–2019)
  - Municipal and Regional Autonomies Committee (2016–2017)
- Human Rights Commission
  - Human Rights and Equal Opportunities Committee (2017–2018)

== Minister of Rural Development ==
Capobianco's brief return to the direction of INRA lasted just over two months; by late January 2020, she was profiled as a potential pick for a ministerial role in the Cabinet of Jeanine Áñez. Áñez and Capobianco's shared relationship extended to their time as delegates to the Constituent Assembly, continuing through the 2015–2020 legislature, where the former served as a senator while the latter was in the Chamber of Deputies. Capobianco's entry into the Áñez administration was formalized on 28 January, with her appointment as head of the Ministry of Rural Development and Lands.

A proponent of biotechnology, during the COVID-19 pandemic, Capobianco sought to open the country to the use of genetically modified agricultural products as a means of generating greater crop yields. In May, the government granted authorization to the National Biosafety Committee to conduct an exhaustive evaluation on the use of genetically modified forms of corn, cotton, soybeans, sugarcane, and wheat. Speaking to El Deber, the minister stated that the use of transgenics was essential to keep Bolivian producers competitive in the international market. Other means of reactivating the agricultural sector were outlined in June when the government presented its economic plan. According to Capobianco, the program—set to last between six months and two years—sought to guarantee food security for the Bolivian population, boost the economy, generate production and trade, and support family farming, medium-scale agriculture, and agro-industrial export agriculture.

== Electoral history ==
Year	Office	Party	Alliance	Votes			Result	Ref.
Year	Office	Party	Alliance	Total	%	P.	Result	Ref.
2006	Constituent	Independent	Social Democratic Power	21,582	39.05%	1st	Won	
2014	Deputy	Social Democratic Movement	Democratic Unity	506,704	39.82%	2nd	Won	(Note: Presented on an electoral list. The data shown represents the share of the vote the entire party/alliance received in that constituency.)
2019	Deputy	Social Democratic Movement	Bolivia Says No	149,071	9.42%	3rd	Annulled	
Source: Plurinational Electoral Organ | Electoral Atlas

Bolivian Constituent Assembly
Seat established	Constituent of the Constituent Assembly from Santa Cruz circumscription 51; 2006–2007; Served alongside: Manfredo Bravo, Gabriel Ugarte	Seat dissolved
Chamber of Deputies of Bolivia
Preceded by Betty Tejada	Member of the Chamber of Deputies from Santa Cruz; 2015–2019	Succeeded by Jordana Middagh
Political offices
Preceded by Mauricio Ordoñez	Minister of Rural Development and Lands; 2020	Succeeded by Wilson Cáceres
