= Santos Quispe =

Governor of La Paz

Wayna Mallku Santos Quispe
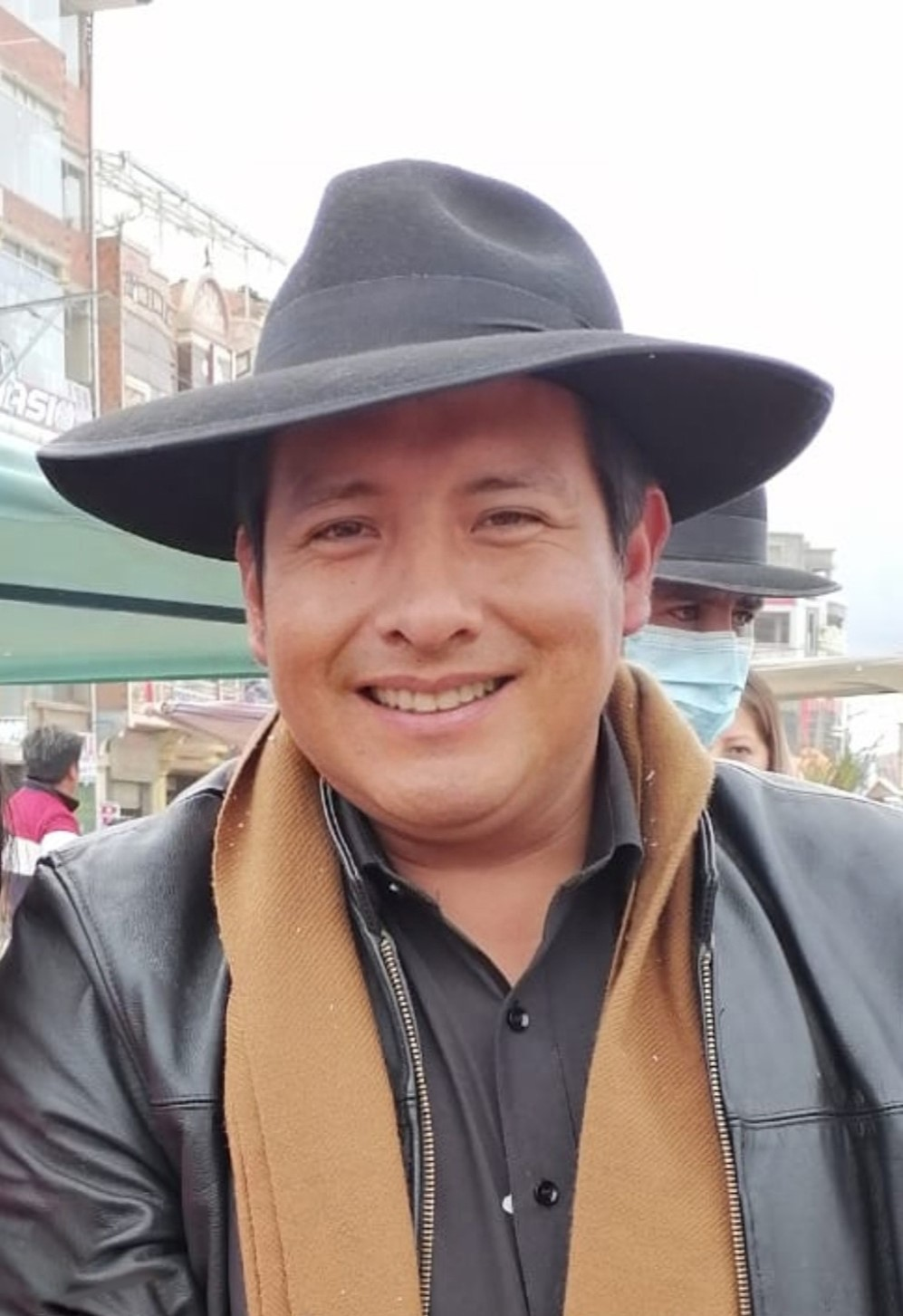

3rd Governor of La Paz
- In office 3 May 2021 – 3 May 2026
- Preceded by: Félix Patzi
- Succeeded by: Luis Revilla

Personal details
- Born: Santos Quispe Quispe; 26 November 1982 (age 43) Achacachi, La Paz, Bolivia
- Party: Forward United People (2014–present)
- Spouse: Ana María Salgado
- Parent: Felipe Quispe (father)
- Education: Higher University of San Andrés; Latin American School of Medicine (MD) (Note: In Bolivia, this degree was recognized by the Ministry of Education as "Bachelor of Medicine".); Public University of El Alto
- Occupation: Doctor; politician
- Website: waynamallku.com

Santos Quispe Quispe (born 26 November 1982), commonly known as Wayna Mallku, (Note: English: Young prince or leader.) is a Bolivian doctor and politician who served as governor of La Paz from 2021 to 2026. A member of Forward United People, of which he is the leader, Quispe was a relative unknown in politics until he replaced his late father, the renowned peasant leader Felipe Quispe, as Jallalla La Paz's candidate for the governorship of the La Paz Department. Shortly after winning the election, Quispe terminated his party's pact with Jallalla, establishing a confrontational attitude with the Departmental Assembly for the duration of his term. In early 2022, he was sentenced to house arrest with the right to work after being discovered allegedly intoxicated at his office.

== Early life and career ==
Santos Quispe was born on 26 November 1982 in Achacachi, La Paz, the youngest of seven siblings born to Felipe Quispe, "the Mallku", a renowned Aymara peasant leader. Quispe was raised in the Aymara community of Chilijaya in the Achacachi municipality, where he resided for the majority of his life. In 2004, he enrolled as a student of sociology at the Higher University of San Andrés and from 2015 was a member of the student body of the Public University of El Alto, where he studied educational sciences. Prior to becoming governor, Quispe was still enrolled in these institutions, carrying out his sixth and third semester, respectively. He studied abroad in Cuba at the Latin American School of Medicine, graduating with a bachelor's degree in medicine in 2012. Upon returning to Bolivia, he joined the Association of Doctors Graduated Abroad and, in 2016, was appointed as part of the administrative support staff of the Departmental Health Service of La Paz (SEDES).

== Governor of La Paz ==
=== Election ===
In 2014, together with his father, Quispe participated in the formation of Forward United People (APU), a political party which, by 2021, lacked legal status with the Supreme Electoral Tribunal to participate in elections. As a result, for the departmental elections in La Paz, Quispe secured an alliance for APU with the civic group Jallalla La Paz of Leopoldo Chui. On 15 December 2020, the two fronts presented Quispe's father, Felipe Quispe, as Jallalla's candidate for the governorship of the La Paz Department.

However, just over a month later, on 19 January 2021, the Mallku unexpectedly died of cardiac arrest in the midst of the campaign. His demise immediately put into question the electoral future of Jallalla, which was forced to seek an alternative candidate. A day after the Mallku's death, the leadership of APU announced that it had decided that Santos Quispe would replace his father on the ballot. Quispe characterized himself as the only candidate capable of fulfilling his father's legacy and stated that, if Jallalla failed to choose him, it would constitute a "betrayal" of the Mallku. He further outlined that he already carried the support of Jallalla's mayoral candidates, including the popular ex-senator Eva Copa, who stated that "out of ethics, out of respect for the memory of our brother Felipe […], his successor is his son, Santos".

After a seven-day mourning period, on 2 February, Jallalla proclaimed Quispe as its replacement nominee. The decision was reached through consensus between representatives from all seventy-eight municipalities in which the organization had a presence. Upon assuming the candidacy, Quispe pledged to "sacrifice my life for humble people, for my father's ideals" and accused those calling him an "inheritor" of tarnishing his late father's image.

The results of the first round of voting on 7 March were close. Exit polls indicated that Franklin Flores, the candidate for the Movement for Socialism, had reached thirty-nine percent of the vote, one point less than what was necessary to achieve a large enough plurality to avoid a runoff and win in the first round. (Note: In Bolivia, a second round is avoided by one candidate either reaching 50% of the vote or achieving a plurality with 10% more votes than the next closest competitor.) Because of this, Quispe denounced the possibility of electoral fraud and led his supporters in a vigil outside the headquarters of the Departmental Electoral Tribunal (TED). Ultimately, the final tally revealed that Flores had failed to reach forty percent, pushing the two candidates into a second round. On 14 April, Quispe was declared the virtual winner of the election, defeating Flores with fifty-five percent of the votes.

=== Tenure ===
Quispe was sworn in as governor of the La Paz Department on 3 May 2021. In his inaugural address, he promised to "always work for the unity of all Paceños" and notably announced that he was "removing my political color, I am not going to work for a political [party]". On 28 April, on the same day the TED accredited him as governor, Quispe had publicly broken his pact with Jallalla and revealed his intent to move forward under the APU acronym. In retaliation, just a week after Quispe took office, on 10 May, Jallalla expelled him from its organization, naming him a "traitor". The group's leader, Leopoldo Chui, went on to announce that Jallalla had already begun to process of seeking support for a recall referendum against the governor. Quispe responded by affirming that Jallalla could not expel him because, as the leader of APU, he was never even a member of that group.

Apart from the break with Jallalla, Quispe was involved in a further six separate controversies within his first month in office. Two of these were recorded on his first day, stemming from the revelation that his wife, Ana María Salgado, had been elected as an assemblywoman, and his irritated response to a journalist who asked him about it. Three days later, on 6 May, it was noted that Quispe had declared Bs0 in his affidavit of assets, despite the fact that he was a salaried worker at SEDES before being elected.

==== Legal processes ====
===== Vehicle collision case =====
On 18 June 2021, Assemblyman Leopoldo Chui filed a criminal complaint with the Prosecutor's Office after the Governor's Office failed to deliver a report on the collision of a government vehicle on 13th Street in Calacoto on 13 June. The victim of the accident, Jaime Jiménez Tórrez, alleged that Quispe was in the vehicle at the time of the crash, a claim denied by his office. On 26 August, the Prosecutor's Office issued an arrest warrant against Quispe on charges of improper use of public goods and services and dangerous driving, though it was ultimately not executed upon appeal. That same day, he testified that the legal processes against him were purely political and affirmed that he was not present during the accident. On 22 December, Prosecutor Gustavo Balderrama reported that an investigation had determined that both Quispe and his driver were intoxicated when his official vehicle was involved in the traffic accident. Quispe denounced political persecution and decried a plot by his opponents to remove him from office. Departmental Secretary of Legal Affairs Mario Flores announced that his office would request an audit of the investigation due to irregularities in its findings. He pointed to the fact that the date of the accident had been changed from 12 to 13 June and asserted that "there is not even a breathalyzer test" as evidence.

===== Detention and house arrest =====
On the night of 1 February 2022, in a live video broadcast on Facebook, departmental assemblyman Israel Alanoca recorded himself confronting Quispe in his office. The video showed the governor in an inebriated state with a bag of empty beer cans at his feet. Quispe admitted to drinking, but assured that had not been doing so in his office. According to Alanoca, at around 9 p.m., government officials had called to inform him that Quispe and members of his staff were in a drunken state at his office. Upon arriving, he recalled hearing "loud music" and stated that the secretaries accompanying the governor had locked themselves in another room. Quispe denied the allegations against him and claimed that the beer cans had been planted there by the opposition. Shortly thereafter, police arrived on the scene and the governor was detained by officers of the Special Crime Fighting Force (FELCC).

After spending the night in a police cell, and notably refusing to submit a breathalyzer test, the Prosecutor's Office charged Quispe with the crimes of improper use of public property and obstruction of justice, for which they requested three months of preventative detention. Instead, an anti-corruption judge in La Paz determined to sentence Quispe to mandatory house arrest with the authorization to be absent from his home between 7 a.m. to 9 p.m. from Monday to Saturday in order to carry out his official duties. Additionally, Quispe was required to post Bs70,000 bail, comply with mandated sobriety, was barred from entering establishments where alcoholic beverages are sold or from leaving the country, and was prohibited from meeting with the nine individuals alleged to have accompanied him on the night he was arrested, or with any of the complainants in his case. Quispe thanked the judge for his decision and affirmed his continued innocence. He also confirmed that he had no intentions of resigning from office. In response, assemblymen from the opposition assured that they would appeal the decision.

== Political positions ==
Santos Quispe has been described as "a true unknown". His campaign failed to deliver a government program to the Supreme Electoral Tribunal, although it should have been submitted in January. After securing his gubernatorial candidacy, Quispe's media presence dropped considerably and attempts by outlets to secure interviews with him were met by claims that his campaign schedule prevented him from finding the time to answer questions regarding his policy proposals. At campaign events, Quispe's rhetoric often appealed to an ideal of fulfilling his father's legacy, but was characterized as lacking clear ideas, not even tangential to the Mallku's indigenismo ideology.

== Electoral history ==
Year	Office	Party	Alliance	First round			Second round			Result	Ref.
Year	Office	Party	Alliance	Total	%	P.	Total	%	P.	Result	Ref.
2021	Governor	Forward United People	Jallalla La Paz	392,132	25.18%	2nd	831,816	55.23%	1st	Won	
Source: Plurinational Electoral Organ | Electoral Atlas

Political offices
Preceded by Félix Patzi	Governor of La Paz; 2021–present	Incumbent
