= Pablo Calucho =

Bolivian journalist (1980–2021)

- Born: 2 February 1980; Cochabamba, Bolivia
- Died: 19 May 2021 (aged 41); Santa Cruz de la Sierra, Bolivia
- Education: Gabriel René Moreno Autonomous University
- Occupation: Journalist
- Spouse: Noelia Echalar Montellano

Juan Pablo Calucho Vargas (2 February 1980 – 19 May 2021) was a Bolivian journalist, often known as the "people's journalist" for making daily and constant coverage of the citizen in the streets.

== Biography ==
=== Early years ===
Calucho was born on 2 February 1980 in the city of Cochabamba, but grew up and lived in the city of Santa Cruz de la Sierra within a family of journalists. He studied at the Domingo Savio Institute and at the Gabriel René Moreno Autonomous University (UAGRM). He entered the world of communication in 1995, when he was still a young man of just 15 years of age.

In 2010, together with the journalist Ezequiel Serres, Calucho began to practice investigative journalism with the program called "Secrets from the street."

=== Death threat ===
On 9 June 2010, the then mayor of Santa Cruz Percy Fernández threatened to shoot Calucho. During a journalistic interview about the illegal takeover of public spaces by street vendors in Santa Cruz, Calucho asked the mayor about possible solutions to the problem; Fernández was upset and responded publicly as follows:

"I'm going to shoot this (Pablo Calucho), bring me my rifle."

— Mayor Percy Fernández (Santa Cruz de la Sierra, Bolivia; 9 June 2010).

In light of these statements, the Santa Cruz Press Workers Union Federation and the Santa Cruz Journalists Association strongly rejected the threat from Percy Fernández, who had a history of similar threats against other journalists. In turn, the National Press Association (ANP) demanded guarantees so that journalists could carry out their informative work.

Some time later, Calucho started working at Red UNO Santa Cruz, but in July 2017 he was fired from the television channel because his social media accounts had more followers than the same official pages of the channel where Calucho worked.

=== Survey for the mayor's office ===
According to an opinion study carried out in March 2020, by the polling company "Captura Consulting", it managed to show that Pablo Calucho had at that time the support of 10.7% of the Santa Cruz population to be the future mayor of Santa Cruz de la Sierra, thus placing Calucho in fourth place behind Rubén Costas, Angélica Sosa and Branko Marinković, and ahead of Jhonny Fernández, Rosario Schamissedine, Carlos Hugo Molina and Freddy Soruco.

=== Illness and death ===
In April 2021, it became publicly known that Calucho was in deteriorating health after contracting COVID-19 and was admitted to intensive care. Some parents from his daughter's school organized a raffle to help the journalist. Calucho died on 19 May 2021, in Santa Cruz de la Sierra, at the age of 41.
