= Udalrico Zambrana =

Bolivian poet (born 1938)

- Born: January 22, 1938 (age 88); Santa Cruz de la Sierra, Bolivia
- Occupation: Poet
- Writing career
- Language: Spanish
- Genre: Poetry

Udalrico Zambrana (Bolivian Spanish pronunciation: [uðal'ɾiko sam'bɾana]; born January 22, 1938), full name Udalrico Antonio Zambrana Franco, is a Bolivian poet.

== Biography ==
=== Early life ===
Zambrana was born in Santa Cruz de la Sierra, Bolivia, to Carlos Zambrana Franco and Delicia Franco de Zambrana. He has two sisters and one brother.

=== Education and career ===
After graduating from the since-demolished Enrique Finot high school in Santa Cruz, Zambrana attended the Gabriel René Moreno Autonomous University (UAGRM), where he studied accountancy. In addition to writing poetry, he has worked in the economic sector and as a journalist.

Poetry by Udalrico Zambrana has been published in numerous Bolivian journals. His poetic output consists mostly of formal verse in rhymed quatrains composed in styles reminiscent of sung folk music associated with eastern Bolivia, in particular the taquirari. A notable feature of Zambrana's writing is the incorporation of linguistic elements associated with the Spanish of lowland Bolivia, and more particularly with Spanish as traditionally spoken in Santa Cruz. His poems often make use of, for example, regionally restricted terms for natural features and distinctive elements of local culture; instances of eye dialect indicating that the speaker is to be read as pronouncing words in a manner characteristic of residents of the department of Santa Cruz, such as replacement of standard Spanish ⟨s⟩ with ⟨j⟩ word-finally; and words formed from application of distinctively eastern Bolivian suffixes such as diminutive -ingo/-inga.

In addition to his writing, Zambrana has acted in regional theatrical troupes and was a longstanding member of a local choir.

=== Marriage and children ===
Zambrana is married to Dolly Román and has three children.

== Published works ==
=== Poetry collections ===
Romancero oriental (1978)

Romancero cruceño I (2000)

Romancero cruceño II (2000)

== Recognition ==
Zambrana's poems "A Santa Cruz," "El carretón de mi tierra," "En la tranquera," "Leña en carretón," and "Rondel de la morochinga" were selected for inclusion in the Internet archive Soy Santa Cruz as pieces deemed illustrative of the cultural heritage of Santa Cruz, Bolivia.
