= Guillermo Capobianco =

Bolivian lawyer, writer, and politician (1945–2020)

Guillermo Capobianco Ribera

Minister of the Interior, Migration, Justice, and Social Defense
- In office 6 August 1989 – 15 March 1991
- President: Jaime Paz Zamora
- Preceded by: Eduardo Pérez Beltrán
- Succeeded by: Carlos Saavedra Bruno

Minister of Urban Development and Housing
- In office 13 April 1984 – 10 January 1985
- President: Hernán Siles Zuazo
- Preceded by: Walter Delgadillo Terceros
- Succeeded by: Emilio Ascarrunz Paredes

Personal details
- Born: Guillermo Capobianco Ribera; 6 June 1945; Concepción, Santa Cruz
- Died: 12 May 2020 (aged 74)
- Political party: Revolutionary Left Movement
- Spouse: Gloria Cruz Justiniano
- Education: Gabriel René Moreno Autonomous University

Guillermo Capobianco Ribera (6 June 1945 – 12 May 2020) was a Bolivian lawyer, writer and politician.

He was Bolivia's Minister of the Interior from 6 August 1989 to 15 March 1991 during the government of President Jaime Paz Zamora and was also Bolivia's Minister of Housing and Urban Development from 13 April 1984 to 10 January 1985 during the second government of President Hernán Siles Suazo.

== Biography ==
He was born on 6 June 1945 in the town of Concepción, which is located in the Ñuflo de Chávez Province in the Department of Santa Cruz. Ribera graduated in 1963 from Colegio Florida in the city of Santa Cruz de la Sierra. He continued with his higher studies, entering to study law at the Gabriel René Moreno Autonomous University (UAGRM), graduating as a lawyer. During his university years he was the executive secretary of the Local University Federation (FUL).

He began his youth leadership in Christian democracy in the late 1960s, starting his militancy in the ranks of the party of the Revolutionary Left Movement (MIR). While the MIR was being founded, he was studying communication in Europe at the Catholic University of Leuven in Belgium.

He returned to Bolivia in the late 1970s where he became the main leader of the MIR in the Department of Santa Cruz, which at the time was a less than left-wing department.3

He died on 12 May 2020 at the age of seventy-four.

== 1978 National Elections ==
He entered the country's political life at the age of thirty-three in 1978. That year he participated as a candidate for deputy in the national elections, but those elections were annulled due to proven fraud.

== Member of Parliament of Bolivia from 1979-1980 ==
The following year, in 1979, he again participated as a candidate for the post of deputy for the Department of Santa Cruz representing the Unidad Democrática y Popular (UDP). But the quagmire of those elections in Congress forced the government of President Lidia Gueiler Tejada to call new general elections to be held in June 1980.

== Deputy of Bolivia 1980-1985 ==
He returned to participate in the 1980 election where he managed to get elected as a deputy by the UDP, but was imprisoned by the government of Luis García Meza and exiled abroad. He returned to Bolivia with the recovery of democracy in 1982 and took up his position as a parliamentarian.

== Minister of Housing and Urban Development of Bolivia (1984-1985) ==
On 13 April 1984, he was sworn in as Bolivia's Minister of Housing and Urban Development to replace Walter Delgadillo Terceros, who had resigned. He remained in office until 10 January 1985, when he was replaced by Emilio Ascarrunz Paredes.

== Member of Parliament of Bolivia 1985-1989 ==
He again ran for re-election as a deputy for the Department of Santa Cruz, but this time he did so representing the party of the Revolutionary Left Movement (MIR). He managed to win the parliamentary seat by remaining in office from 6 August 1985 to 6 August 1989.

== 1987 Municipal Elections ==
He also participated in the 1987 municipal elections, running for mayor of Santa Cruz de la Sierra on behalf of the MIR, but was unsuccessful after coming in second place.

== 1989 National Elections ==
In 1989, he again participated in the national elections of that same year, as a senator for the Department of Santa Cruz for the MIR, but this time he was not successful either.

== Minister of the Interior of Bolivia (1989-1991) ==
On 6 August 1989, Bolivian President Jaime Paz Zamora appointed Guillermo Capobianco as the new Minister of the Interior of Bolivia to replace Eduardo Pérez Beltrán, who was in the previous government of Víctor Paz Estenssoro.

During his term as minister, he managed to dismantle the terrorist group Comisión Néstor Paz Zamora (CNPZ) and the Tupac Katari Guerrilla Army (EGTK), which at the time was made up of Felipe Quispe "El Mallku" (1942) and Alvaro Garcia Linera (1962).

== Lonsdale case ==
In June 1990, private businessman Jorge Lonsdale (1930-1990) was kidnapped by the terrorist group Nestor Paz Zamora Commission (CNP) led by Miguel Northuster (1961-1990), an Italian originally from South Tyrol. On 5 December of that same year, the Bolivian police stormed the house where Jorge Lonsdale was kidnapped. The result of the police operation ended with the death of the kidnapping terrorists and the kidnapped businessman. Public opinion in the country described the police operation as a failure and the Ministry of the Interior was accused of having used unnecessary violence in addition to the murder of all the kidnappers.

In 1991, Ribera appointed former Army General Faustino Rico Toro to the post of anti-narcotics director. This decision caused discomfort at the U.S. Embassy in Bolivia, which asked for his resignation as interior minister, so he was forced to resign his post on 15 March 1991, and was replaced by Carlos Saavedra Buno.

Political offices
Preceded by Walter Delgadillo Terceros	Minister of Urban Development and Housing; 1984–1985	Succeeded by Emilio Ascarrunz Paredes
Preceded by Eduardo Pérez Beltrán	Minister of the Interior, Migration, Justice, and Social Defense; 1989–1991	Succeeded by Carlos Saavedra Bruno
