= Félix Patzi =

Bolivian politician

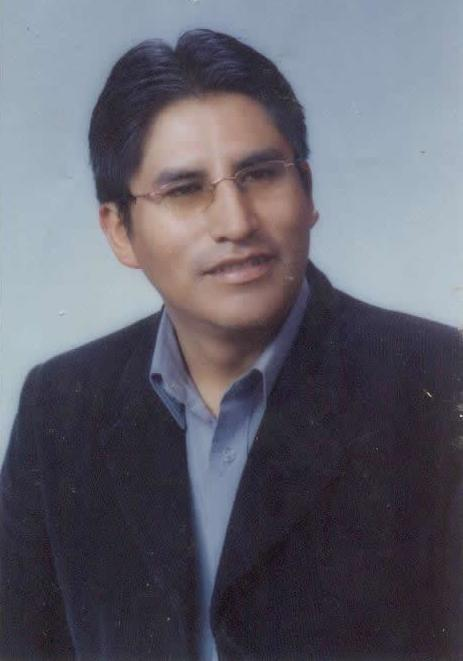

Governor of La Paz
- In office 31 May 2015 – 3 May 2021
- Preceded by: César Cocarico Yana
- Succeeded by: Santos Quispe

Minister of Education
- In office 22 January 2006 – 23 January 2007
- President: Evo Morales
- Preceded by: María Mejía Barragán
- Succeeded by: Víctor Cáceres Rodríguez

Personal details
- Born: Félix Patzi Paco; 21 February 1967 (age 59) Colquencha, Bolivia
- Party: Third System Movement
- Other political affiliations: Movement for Socialism (2006–2015); Sovereignty and Freedom (2015–2018)
- Spouse: Maciel Terraces

Félix Patzi Paco (born 21 February 1967) is a Bolivian academic and politician. He was the governor of the La Paz Department from 2015 to 2021. A member of the Aymara ethnic group, he has been active in supporting indigenous movements in Bolivia.

== Political career ==
Born in Santiago de Llallagua, Aroma, La Paz, Patzi served as Bolivia's Minister of Education in the government of Evo Morales from 2006 to 2007. In 2010, he was briefly a candidate for governor of La Paz Department on behalf of the Movement for Socialism – Political Instrument for the Sovereignty of the Peoples (MAS-IPSP), but was removed following a drunk driving incident. In March 2010, he founded a new political party, Integration for Change (Spanish: Integración Para el Cambio, IPC), which was later organized as the Third System Movement.

In the 2015, he ran again for governor of La Paz, this time on behalf of the Sovereignty and Freedom party (Spanish: Soberanía y Libertad; SOL.bo) founded by La Paz's mayor, Luis Revilla. He won the March 29 elections with 52% of the vote, far ahead of rival candidate Felipa Huanca of the MAS-IPSP, becoming SOL.bo's highest elected official.

Political offices
Preceded by María Mejía Barragán	Minister of Education; 2006–2007	Succeeded by Víctor Cáceres Rodríguez
Preceded by César Cocarico Yana	Governor of La Paz; 2015–2021	Succeeded by Santos Quispe
