= Konani =

Coordinates: 17.4392°S 67.5181°W

- Town
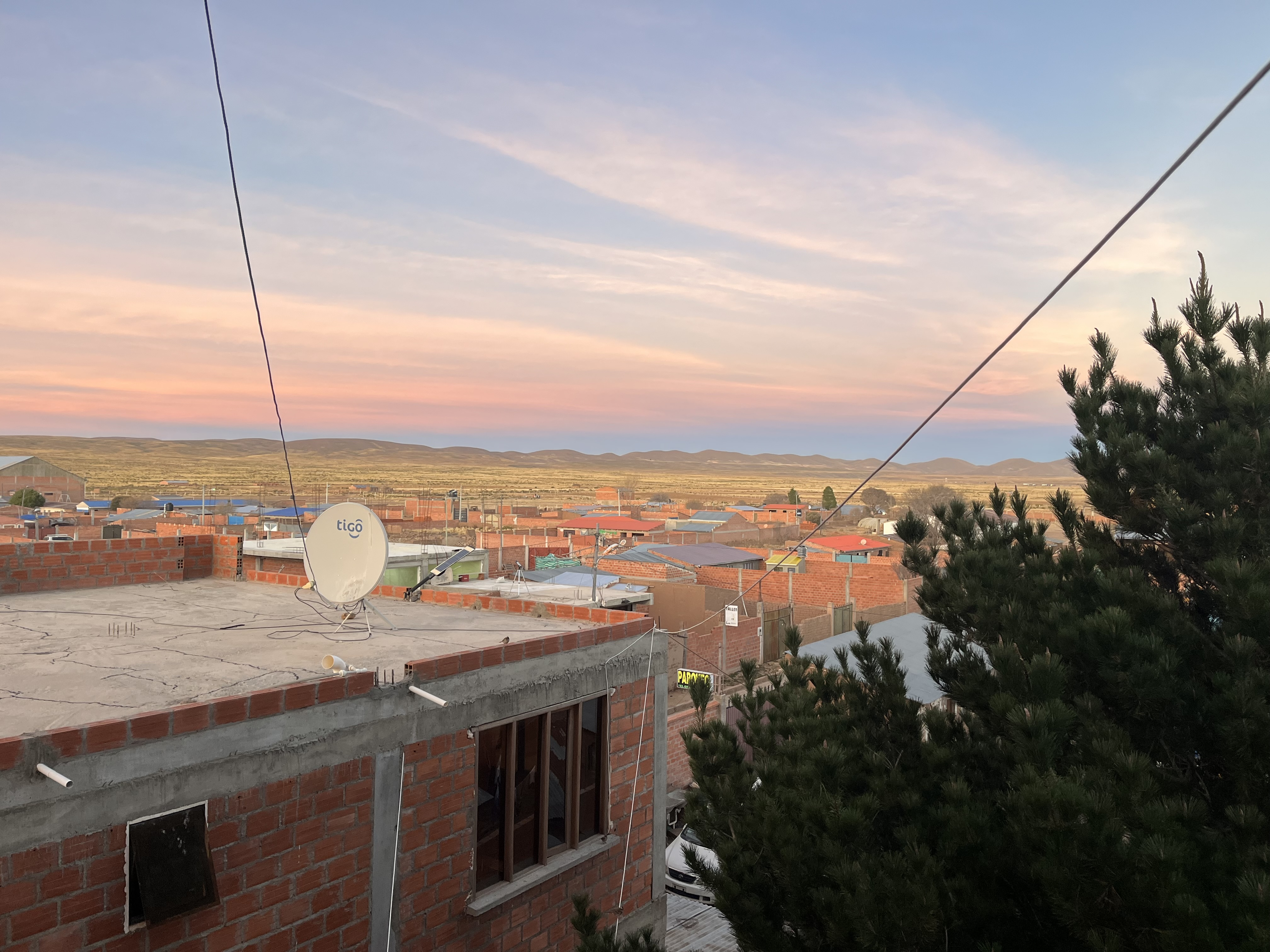
- Interactive map of Konani
- Country: Bolivia
- Time zone: UTC-4 (BOT)

Konani is a small town in Bolivia.
