= San Pedro, Santistevan =

Coordinates: 16.8267°S 63.4814°W

San Pedro (Santistevan)
- Town
- Interactive map of San Pedro (Santistevan)
- Country: Bolivia
- Time zone: UTC-4 (BOT)

San Pedro (Santistevan) is a town and small municipalities in Bolivia.

== Climate ==
Climate data for San Pedro, Santistevan (1980–2012)
Month	Jan	Feb	Mar	Apr	May	Jun	Jul	Aug	Sep	Oct	Nov	Dec	Year
Mean daily maximum °C (°F)	31.7 (89.1)	31.5 (88.7)	31.6 (88.9)	31.3 (88.3)	28.7 (83.7)	27.7 (81.9)	27.8 (82.0)	29.4 (84.9)	30.9 (87.6)	32.2 (90.0)	32.1 (89.8)	31.7 (89.1)	30.6 (87.0)
Daily mean °C (°F)	26.8 (80.2)	26.6 (79.9)	26.5 (79.7)	25.6 (78.1)	23.1 (73.6)	22.2 (72.0)	21.6 (70.9)	22.8 (73.0)	24.2 (75.6)	26.1 (79.0)	26.7 (80.1)	26.7 (80.1)	24.9 (76.9)
Mean daily minimum °C (°F)	21.9 (71.4)	21.6 (70.9)	21.4 (70.5)	19.9 (67.8)	17.6 (63.7)	16.6 (61.9)	15.4 (59.7)	16.2 (61.2)	17.6 (63.7)	20.0 (68.0)	21.2 (70.2)	21.8 (71.2)	19.3 (66.7)
Average precipitation mm (inches)	275.5 (10.85)	231.2 (9.10)	152.2 (5.99)	97.1 (3.82)	107.4 (4.23)	77.1 (3.04)	36.5 (1.44)	51.3 (2.02)	95.3 (3.75)	122.8 (4.83)	160.3 (6.31)	238.2 (9.38)	1,644.9 (64.76)
Average precipitation days	11.8	10.6	9.1	5.6	5.8	4.8	3.1	3.0	4.5	6.0	7.2	10.6	82.1
Average relative humidity (%)	82.9	82.0	81.1	79.0	77.2	73.2	76.5	65.9	66.9	74.9	76.8	80.1	76.4
Source: Servicio Nacional de Meteorología e Hidrología de Bolivia

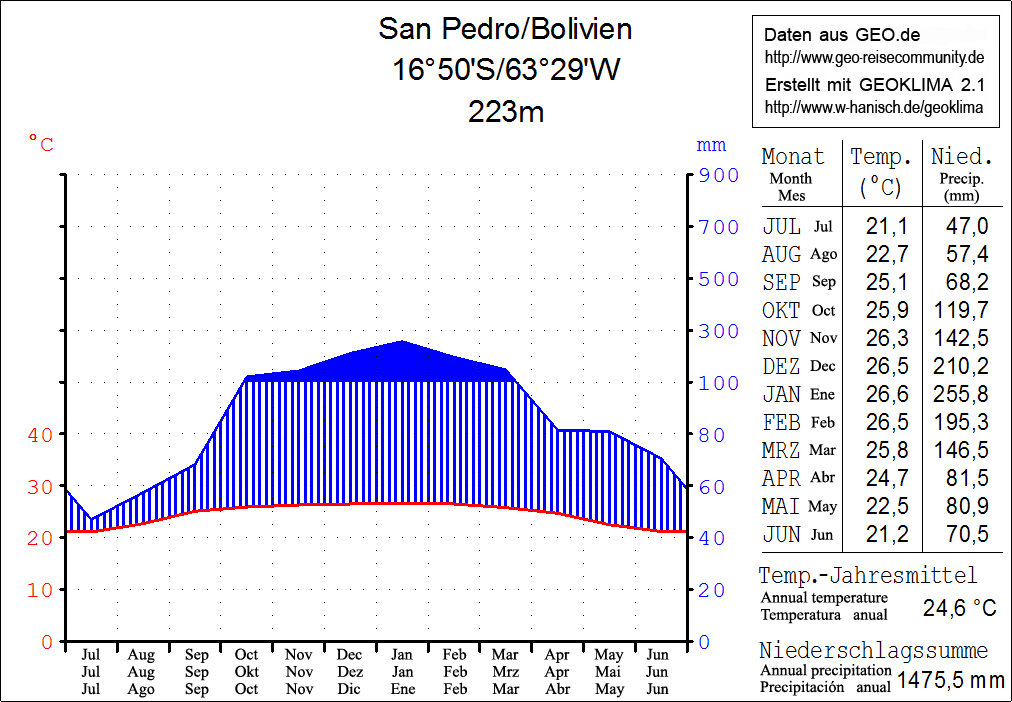
Climate chart
