= Gabriel René Moreno Autonomous University =

Public University of Bolivia founded in 1880

Coordinates: 17°41′48″S 63°08′45″W

- Universidad Autónoma Gabriel René Moreno
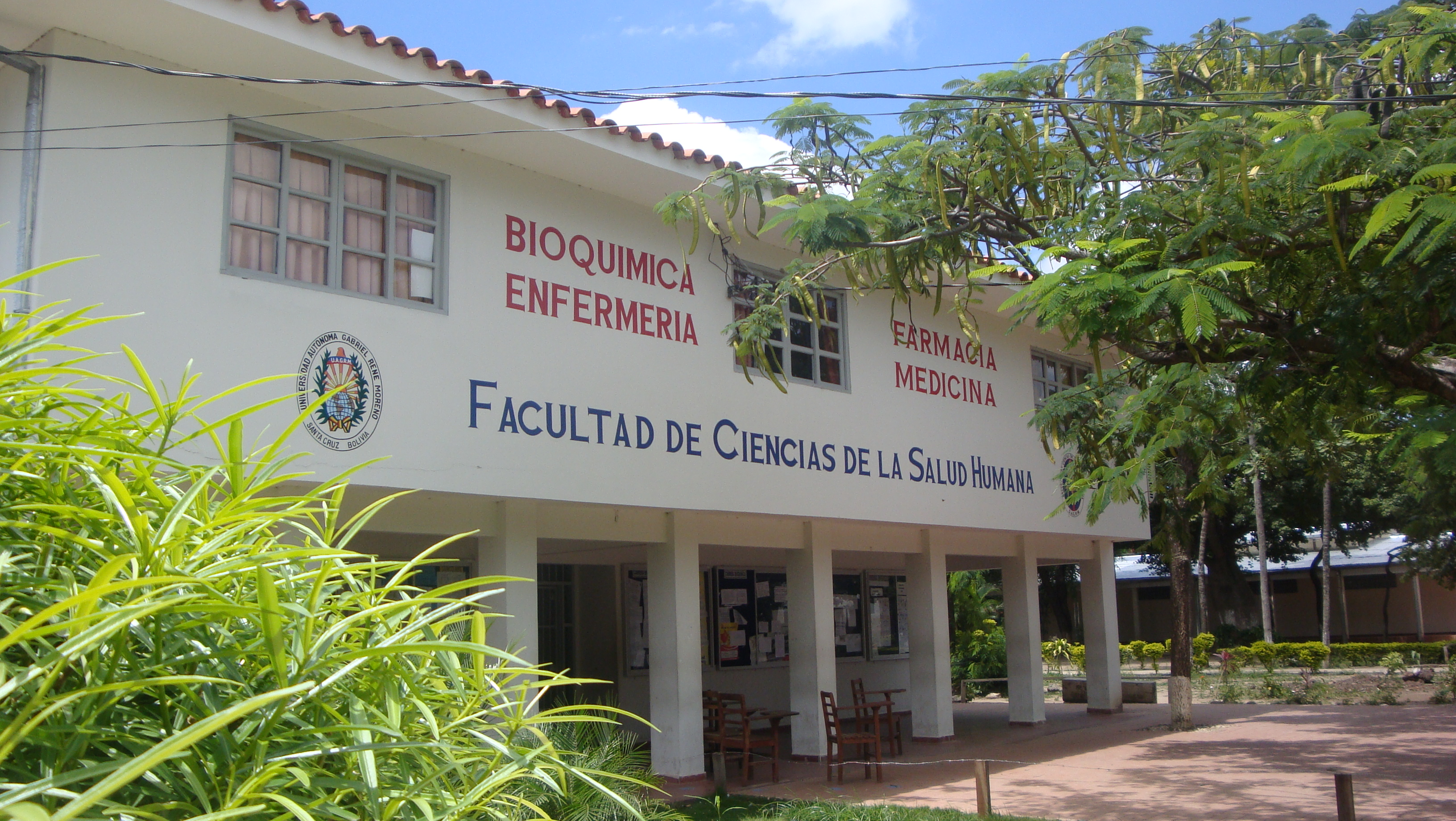
- Former names: Santa Cruz University
- Motto in English: University Management for Society
- Type: Public
- Established: 1880; 146 years ago
- Rector: Vicente Cuellar
- Academic staff: 2 000^{a}
- Administrative staff: 1 000^{a}
- Students: 90 000^{a}
- Location: Santa Cruz de la Sierra, Bolivia
- Campus: Urban
- Language: Spanish
- Colours: Carmine and Navy Blue
- Nickname: UAGRM
- Website: uagrm.edu.bo
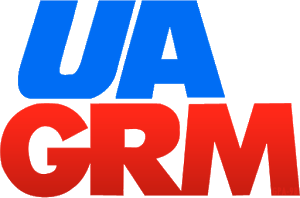

The Gabriel René Moreno Autonomous University (Spanish: Universidad Autónoma Gabriel René Moreno) is a university in Santa Cruz de la Sierra, Bolivia. It was created by supreme decree of December 15, 1879. The first rector was Bishop Juan Jose Valdivia, and the first university careers offered were Medicine, Theology, and Law.

The university is named after thinker, historian, and literary figure Gabriel René Moreno, called the "Prince of the Letters".

The university is the fifth-best university in Bolivia, as of 2023, and is first in academic quality in the department of Santa Cruz.

== Faculties ==
The university currently has 18 faculties, 6 of which are located off the main urban campus.

=== Main Campus ===
- Faculty of Legal, Political and Social Sciences.
- Faculty of Economic, Administrative and Financial Sciences
- Faculty of Agricultural Sciences
- Faculty of Exact Sciences and Technology
- Faculty of Veterinary Sciences
- School of Public Accounting
- Polytechnic School
- Faculty of Humanities
- Faculty of Engineering in Computer Science and Telecommunications
- Faculty of Habitat, Design and Art Sciences
- Faculty of Human Health Sciences
- Faculty of Pharmaceutical and Biochemical Sciences

=== Other Faculties ===
- Integral Faculty of the Cruceño Valleys
- Integral Faculty of the Chaco
- Integral Faculty of the Chiquitania
- Integral Faculty of the North
- Integral Faculty of the NorthWest
- Integral Faculty of Ichilo

== Culture ==
The university has different places to carry out cultural events such as museums and a university theater.

=== Museums ===
- Museum of History and Historical Archive
- Museum of Natural History "Noel Kempff Mercado"

=== Theater ===
- University Auditorium "Dr. Humberto Parada Caro "

== Research Institutes and Research Centers ==
The university currently has several institutes, centers and observatories for research, supervised by the University Directorate of Research (Dirección Universitaria de Investigación).

=== Research Institutes ===
- Institute of Technological Research
- Research Institute of the Faculty of Agricultural Sciences
- Institute of Economic and Social Research (IIES)
- Research Institute of the Faculty of Pharmaceutical and Biochemical Sciences
- Forest Research Institute (INIF)
- Bolivian Soy Institute
- Research Institute of the Faculty of Humanities
- Research Institute of the Faculty of Engineering in Computer Sciences and Telecommunications (IICCT)
- Research Institute "Monica Von Borries"
- Research Institute of the Habitat Sciences Faculty

=== Research Centers ===
- Geo Cartography and Cadastre Research Center
- Food Technology Research and Development Center
- Center for Research and Business Development
- Center for Research and Management of Renewable Natural Resources
- Social Research Center for Development Support
- Center for Agricultural Research and Practice "Guirarapu"
- Diabetes Care and Prevention Center "Cardenal Julio Terrazas"

=== Observatories ===
- National Political Observatory (UAGRM)
- Observatory of the Environment
- Economic Observatory
- Children and Youth Observatory

== Notable alumni ==
- Udalrico Zambrana - poet
