= 2015 Bolivian regional elections =

The 2015 Bolivian regional elections were held on 29 March 2015. Departmental and municipal authorities were elected by an electorate of approximately 6 million people.

Among the officials elected were:

- Governors of all nine departments
- Members of Departamental Legislative Assemblies in each department; 23 seats in these Assemblies will represent indigenous communities, and have been selected by traditional usos y costumbres in the weeks prior to the election
- Mayors and Council members in all 339 municipalities
- Provincial Subgovernors and Municipal Corregidors (executive authorities) in Beni
- Sectional Development Executives at the provincial level in Tarija
- The nine members of the Regional Assembly in the autonomous region of Gran Chaco

Altogether, 2,642 officials were elected. Almost every elected office, but not Mayor, included a simultaneously elected alternate of the same party.

== Political parties participating ==
Only the Movement towards Socialism was involved in all 339 municipal contests. Other parties participating in large numbers of contests are as follows:

Party	Number of Municipalities	Mayors elected	Significant Cities Won
Movement towards Socialism	339	227	Two departmental capitals: Sucre, Potosí.
Democrats		24	Santa Cruz de la Sierra, Cochabamba, its other 21 municipalities are in Santa Cruz Department.
Movement for Sovereignty		14	All in La Paz Department
Revolutionary Nationalist Movement		11	9 in Beni, and 4 in Santa Cruz
Autonomous Nationalities for Change and Empowerment (NACER)		3	
National Unity Front (UN)		2	El Alto
Pando United and Dignified		2	Cobija
UNIR		2	Tarija

== Results ==
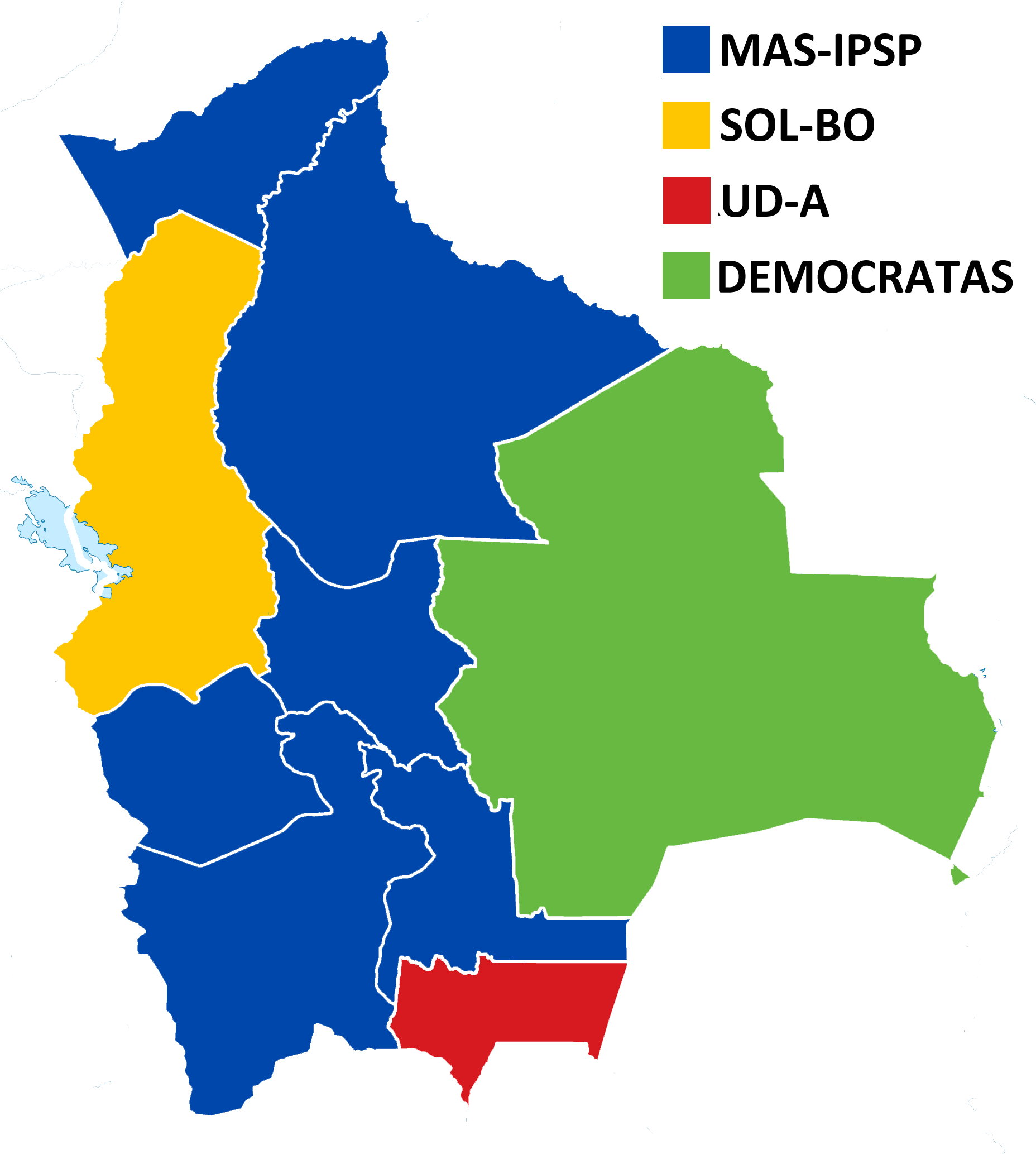
Winning party in departmental governors' elections

Bolivia's ruling MAS party suffered some defeats and setbacks in the subnational elections compared to its performance in 2010 and its victory in the 2014 presidential election.

=== Governors ===
Party		Votes	%	Candidates	Elected
Movement for Socialism	MAS-IPSP	1 909 314	41,79 %	9	6
Social Democrat Movement	DEMOCRATAS	940 286	20,58 %	4	1
Sovereignty and Freedom	SOL-BO	673 244	14,73 %	1	1
National Unity Front	UN	182 404	3,99 %	4	0
Revolutionary Nationalist Movement	MNR	108 544	2,37 %	5	0
Autonomist Departmental Unity	UD-A	105 391	2,31 %	1	1
Front for Victory	FPV	101 871	2,23 %	6	0
We Are All Chuquisaca	CST	101 257	2,22 %	1	0
United for Cochabamba	UNICO	76 907	1,68 %	1	0
Movement for Sovereignty	MPS	63 941	1,40 %	1	0
People's Originary Movement of Potosí	POTOSI-MOP	53 287	1,17 %	1	0
Autonomous Nationalities for Change and Empowerment	NACER	49 214	1,08 %	1	0
New Citizen Power	NPC	47 220	1,03 %	1	0
Tarija For All	TPT	31 310	0,68 %	1	0
Popular Participation	PP	28 700	0,63 %	1	0
Solidarity Civic Unity	UCS	20 042	0,44 %	1	0
Patriotic Social Alliance	ASP	18 513	0,41 %	1	0
Strength and Hope	FE	17 082	0,37 %	1	0
Pando United and Dignified	PUD	13 042	0,28 %	1	0
Up with Chuquisaca	ACH	11 427	0,25 %	1	0
Revolutionary Left Front	FRI	9070	0,20 %	1	0
Integrity, Security, and Autonomy	ISA	5768	0,13 %	1	0
Amazon Social Power	PASO	1142	0,02 %	1	0
Valid votes		4 568 976	88,08 %	32	9
Blank votes		356 048	6,86 %		
Null votes		261 942	5,05 %		
Total ballots cast		5 186 966	100,00 %		
Source: Tribunal Supremo Electoral, Resultados Elecciones Subnacionales 2015

The governors of Beni and Tarija were elected in a May 3 runoff election.
