= Mallku =

"Leader" in Aymara language

Mallku is a title roughly translating as "prince" or "leader" in the Aymara language of South America. The Aymara people recognise an Apu Mallku as their "supreme leader" or "king". There is also an institution called the Council of Mallkus and Amautas which acts rather like an upper house of the indigenous parliament of the Andes region and consists of four delegates from each of the modern Latin American states that comprise the Greater Collasuyu region.

== See also ==
- Cacique
- Kuraka
- Ñusta
