= Plurinational Electoral Organ =

Electoral organ in Bolivia

The Plurinational Electoral Organ (Spanish: Órgano Electoral Plurinacional) is the independent electoral branch of the government of Bolivia. It replaced the National Electoral Court in 2010.

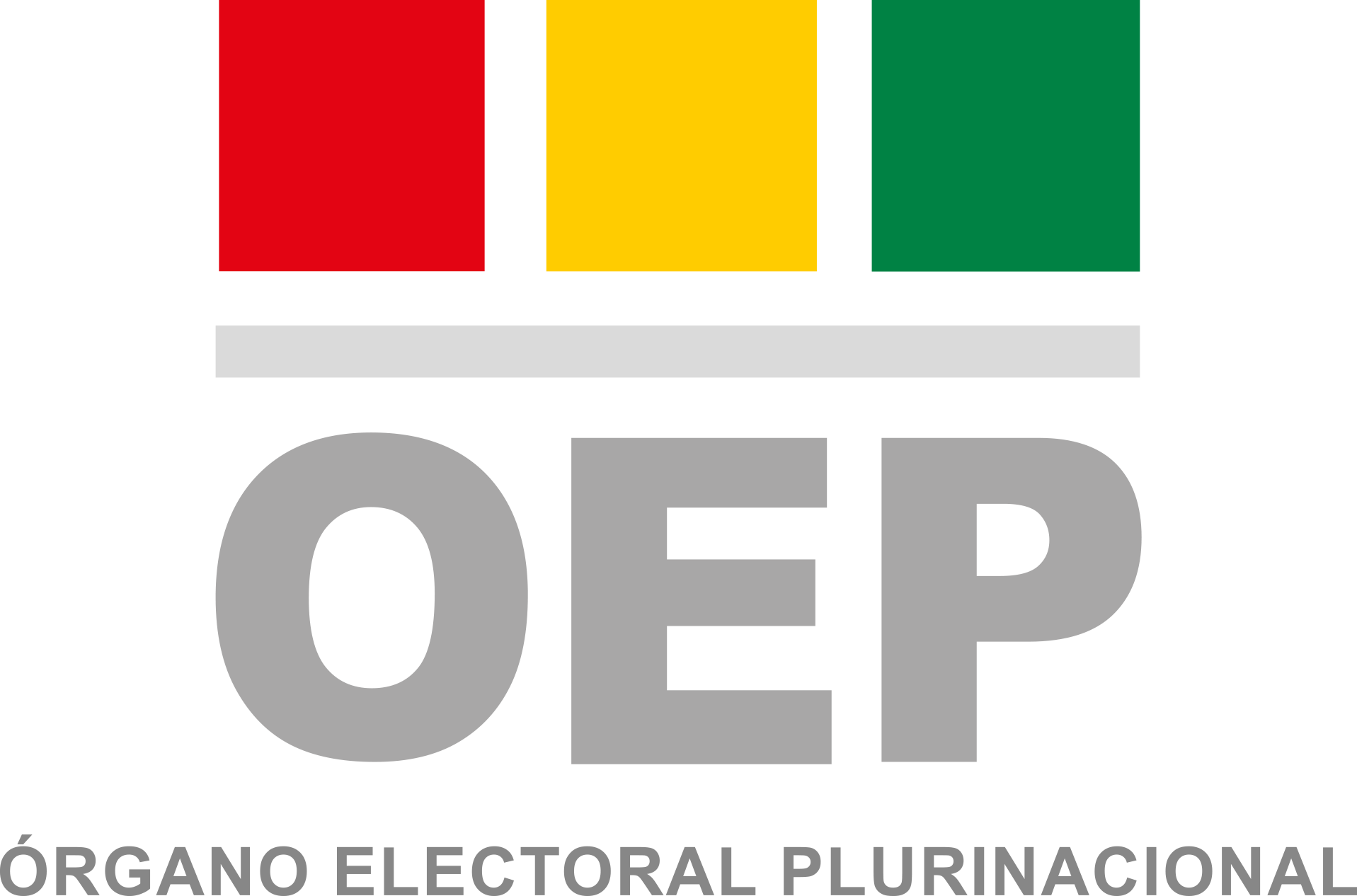
Logo of the Plurinational Electoral Organ (OEP)

== Composition and function ==
The OEP consists of the 7-member Supreme Electoral Tribunal, the nine Departmental Electoral Tribunals, Electoral Judges, the anonymously selected Juries at Election Tables, and Electoral Notaries, as well as three operative branches. Its operations are mandated by the Constitution and regulated by the Electoral Regime Law (Law 026). The seat of the Organ and of the Supreme Electoral Tribunal are in La Paz; while the ruling MAS-IPSP party offered the headquarters to Sucre during the controversy over capital status during the 2006–07 Constituent Assembly, negotiations were inconclusive. In June 2010, the Bolivian Senate rejected calls from Chuquisaca parliamentarians to place the headquarters in Sucre.

The Organ's operative branches are the Civil Register Service (Spanish: Servicio de Registro Cívico, Sereci), the Intercultural Service for Strengthening Democracy (Spanish: Servicio Intercultural de Fortalecimiento Democrático, Sifde), and the Technical Unit for Oversight (Spanish: Unidad Técnica de Fiscalización, UTF). The Civil Register Service is charged with continually maintaining the electoral rolls and consolidates the functions of registering birth, marriage, death, biometric identification, and residence. The UTF audits and ensures the transparency of parties and political organizations.

The first election to be supervised by the new Organ was the judicial elections of late 2011, followed by special municipal elections.

== Supreme Electoral Tribunal and Departmental Electoral Tribunals ==
The Supreme Electoral Tribunal (Spanish: Tribunal Supremo Electoral) oversees elections nationwide via the nine Departmental Electoral Tribunals (Spanish: Tribunales Electorales Departamentales (TEDs)), one for each of the Bolivian departmental regions (Beni, Cochabamba, Chuquisaca, La Paz, Oruro, Pando, Tarija, Potosí, and Santa Cruz) which are responsible for elections at the local level. The TSE consists of seven members, six of whom are chosen by the Plurinational Legislative Assembly and one designated by the president. There are also six alternate members chosen by the Assembly. By law it must contain at least two people of indigenous background and at least three women. They serve in this position for a period of six years. The TEDs consist of five members each of which one must be from an indigenous group or nation and at least two must be women.

The members of the TSE are as follows:

Name	Office	Designated by	Term Began	Background
Salvador Romero Ballivián	President	President Jeanine Áñez	25 November 2019	Bolivian political sociologist, researcher and writer. PhD from Institute of Political Studies, Paris. Was member of the TED for La Paz between 1995 and 1998. Member of the National Electoral Court (CNE) under the Presidency of Carlos Mesa.
Angélica Ruiz Vaca Diez	Vice President	Plurinational Legislative Assembly	20 November 2019	Has electoral experience, was Legal Counsel of the TED for Santa Cruz, Director of the Civil Registry of Beni, and lawyer of the National Electoral Court.
Daniel Atahuichi Quispe		Plurinational Legislative Assembly	25 November 2019	Degree in Economics and PhD in Economics. Of indigenous origin.
Rosario Baptista Canedo		Plurinational Legislative Assembly	25 November 2019	Lawyer.
Nancy Gutiérrez Salas		Plurinational Legislative Assembly	25 November 2019	Degree in Communication and master's degree in Intercultural Communication.
Óscar Hassenteufel Salazar		Plurinational Legislative Assembly	25 November 2019	Lawyer. President of the Supreme Court of Justice, between 1993 and 2001; and of the National Electoral Court, from 2001 to 2006.
Francisco Vargas Camacho		Plurinational Legislative Assembly	25 November 2019	Experience in the electoral field, as Responsible for Coordination of Intercultural Service for Democratic Strengthening (SIFDE) of the TED for Santa Cruz from 2014 to the present.

=== Previous members ===
The first TSE consisted of Wilfredo Ovando (President), selected by Evo Morales, along with Irineo Valentín Zuna, Ramiro Paredes, Wilma Velasco, Fanny Rosario Rivas Rojas, Dina Agustina Chuquimia Alvarado and Marco Daniel Ayala Soria.

The previous members of the TSE were elected in 2015 and were María Eugenia Choque (President), Antonio Costas, José Luis Exeni, Idelfonso Mamani, Dunia Sandoval and Katia Uriona.
