= 2011 Bolivian special municipal elections =

The 2011 Bolivian special municipal elections were held on 18 December 2011. These elections cover three of five municipalities currently without elected mayors in Bolivia: Sucre, Quillacollo, and Pazña. Elections for the Mayor of Punata will be held 29 April or 6 May 2012. Newly elected mayors will receive their credentials from the Supreme Electoral Tribunal on 27 January 2011, after which they may be sworn in.

== Elections ==
Special Election to be held	City	Outgoing Mayor (Party)	Notes	Mayor Elect
18 December 2011	Sucre, Chuquisaca	Jaime Barrón (PAÍS)	Resigned in July 2010 under indictment for May 24, 2008 violence	Moisés Torres (LÍDER/UN-PAÍS)
18 December 2011	Quillacollo, Cochabamba	Héctor Cartagena (UNE)		Charles Becerra (UNE)
18 December 2011	Pazña, Oruro	Víctor Centeno (MAS-IPSP)	Resigned on 15 June 2010 under "psychological pressure and regional divisions"	Efraín Peñafiel (MAS-IPSP)
13 January 2013	Punata, Cochabamba	Víctor Balderrama (Insurgente Martín Uchu)	Suspended under indictment for aggravated rape of a minor on August 10, 2010 (convicted September 2011); pledged to resign to allow new elections	
To be determined	Catacora, La Paz			

== Mayoral races ==
=== Sucre ===
In Sucre, the mayoral candidates are as follows:

- Horacio Poppe - May 25 Movement (Falangist)
- Moisés Torres Ramírez - Renewing Freedom and Democracy (LÍDER) Front
- Orlando Hurtado - Without Fear Movement
- (withdrawn, but on the ballot) Jaime Hurtado Poveda - Pact of Social Integration (PAÍS)–National Unity Front Alliance
- Maribel Salinas - We Are All Chuquisaca
- Iván Arciénega – Movement for Socialism – Political Instrument for the Sovereignty of the Peoples (MAS-IPSP)

Despite ideological affinity, the right-wing parties were unable to decide on an alliance candidate until the week of the poll. However, the National Unity Front and Pact of Social Integration unified on December 13 behind the candidacy of Moisés Torres Ramírez, bringing the number of right-leaning candidates down by one.

==== Results ====
The right-wing opposition candidate Moisés Torres Ramírez was elected; he won a plurality, and a majority if the votes for his coalition partner Jaime Hurtado Poveda are included.

Sucre special municipal election, 2011 — partial results, 99.17% reporting
Mayoral Candidate	Party	Votes	Percentage
Moisés Torrez Chive	Renewing Freedom and Democracy (LIDER)	50,453	46.35%
Iván Jorge Arciénega Collazos	Movement towards Socialism	41,387	38.02%
Horacio Poppe Inch	May 25 Movement	7,003	6.43%
withdrawn: Jaime Eduardo Hurtado Poveda	Unity-Pact of Social Integration	5,679	5.22%
Orlando Hurtado Choque	Without Fear Movement	2,563	2.35%
Maribel Salinas Ortega	We Are All Chuquisaca	1,769	1.63%
	Valid votes	108,854	90.55%
	Blank votes	1,454	1.21%
	Null votes	9,905	8.24%
	Total votes	120,213	74.05% of registered voters
Source: Tribunal Supremo Electoral, ELECCIÓN DE ALCALDESA O ALCALDE - 2011 RESULTADOS PARCIALES - MUNICIPIO - SUCRE

=== Quillacollo ===
In Quillacollo, the mayoral candidates are as follows:

- René Fernández Céspedes - Without Fear Movement (MSM)
- Miguel Edwin Guzmán Achá - Movement for Socialism – Political Instrument for the Sovereignty of the Peoples (MAS-IPSP)
- Charles Cristhian Becerra - Unity New Hope (UNE)

Some 82 thousand people are registered to vote in the municipality.

==== Results ====
Quillacollo special municipal election, 2011
Mayoral Candidate	Party	Votes	Percentage
Charles Christhian Becerra Sejas	Unity New Hope	20,043	37.97%
Miguel Edwin Guzmán Achá	Movement towards Socialism	19,477	36.90%
René Fernández Cespédes	Without Fear Movement	13,261	25.12%
	Valid votes	52,781	90.24%
	Blank votes	748	1.28%
	Null votes	4,960	8.48%
	Total votes	58,489	70.95% of registered voters
Source: Tribunal Supremo Electoral, ELECCIÓN DE ALCALDESA O ALCALDE - 2011 RESULTADOS PARCIALES - MUNICIPIO - QUILLACOLLO

=== Pazña ===
In Pazña, the mayoral candidates are as follows:

- Pablo Alejandro Valero - Without Fear Movement (MSM)
- Gróver Peñafiel - Movement for Socialism – Political Instrument for the Sovereignty of the Peoples (MAS-IPSP)
