= Municipal Council of Sucre, Bolivia =

The Municipal Council is the legislative branch of the government of the municipality of Sucre, the constitutional capital of Bolivia. The council consists of eleven elected members (as do all department capitals and municipalities with populations over 75,000). The Council elects its own President, Vice President and Secretary.

== Current council members ==
The current council was elected in the March 2026 elections.

Sucre has a municipal council with 11 seats,

Seat	Type	Name	Party / Political Organization
1	Member	Daysi Mariel Dávalos Vargas	AGN
1	Alternate	Fernando Alfredo Fernández Ponce De León	AGN
2	Member	Alexis Imbert Aillon Valverde	PATRIA-UNIDOS
2	Alternate	Inés Caba Llanos	PATRIA-UNIDOS
3	Member	Carmen Rosa Salas Coila	FUERZA
3	Alternate	Julio Llanqui Partes	FUERZA
4	Member	Mario Avendaño Nava Morales	LIBRE
4	Alternate	Ximena Georget Córdova Aguilar	LIBRE
5	Member	Juan Pablo Cervantes Zambrana	AGN
5	Alternate	Miriam Noelía López Cutipa	AGN
6	Member	Angélica Martínez	PATRIA-UNIDOS
6	Alternate	Igor Laredo Daza	PATRIA-UNIDOS
7	Member	Omar Paúl Aguilar Condo	CHR
7	Alternate	Laura Verónica Ríos Castellón	CHR
8	Member	Jenny Beatriz Campero Rodríguez	AGN
8	Alternate	Juan Carlos Ortubé Cervantes	AGN
9	Member	Alberto Gonzales Ramírez	FUERZA
9	Alternate	Zulma Martínez Vargas	FUERZA
10	Member	Carlos Mora Sandi	PATRIA-UNIDOS
10	Alternate	Milena Gabriela Ordóñez Claure	PATRIA-UNIDOS
11	Member	Sixta Flores Hinojosa	LIBRE
11	Alternate	Cirilo Daza Almendras	LIBRE
Source: Supreme Electoral Tribunal.

== Past council members ==
=== 2021 election ===
The members of the municipal council elected on May 3, 2021 were:

- Oscar Sandy (MAS)
- Yolanda Barrios (MAS)
- Rodolfo Avilés (MAS)
- Guadalupe Fernández (MAS)
- Eduardo Lora (R-2025)
- Melisa Cortés (R-2025)
- Antonio Pino (R-2025)
- Carmen Rosa Torres (R-2025)
- Jenny Montaño (C-A)
- Gonzalo Pallares (CST)
- Edwin González (Unidos)

=== 2010 election ===
The Municipal Council was elected in the regional election of April 4, 2010. The election was by proportional representation with the Pact of Social Integration and the Movement Towards Socialism gaining the largest and second largest shares of the vote.

The council elected in April 2010 and seated in late December 2010 is as follows:

Office	Council Member	Biography	Party
President	Domingo Martínez Cáceres	Agricultural engineer, former Sub-Mayor, previous Council President, docent in the Agronomy Faculty at UMRPSFXCH.	Onward, Neighbors (ran with Sucre First)
Vice President	Germán Gutiérrez Gantier	Lawyer, former mayor of Sucre, former national deputy, former member of the Judicial Council, docent	Pact of Social Integration
Secretary	Arminda Corina Herrera Gonzales	Teacher, Constituent Assembly member for Chuquisaca and former MAS member	New Citizen Alternative
	Nelson Guzmán Fernández	Communicator, law student, leader of Federación Universitaria Local and the University Club.	Pact of Social Integration
	Susy Barrios Quiroz	Psychologist, former Sub-Mayor of Districts 2 and 5, President of Feminine Civic Committee of Chuquisaca	Pact of Social Integration
	Norma Rojas Salazar	Executive Secretary of Bolivian Red Cross and neighborhood leader	Pact of Social Integration
	Juán Nacer Villagómez Ledezma	Public health doctor, former docent, former functionary of the Health Ministry and former chief of the Planning Unit of the Departmental Health Service	MAS-IPSP
	Verónica Berríos chosen as interim Mayor 19 June 2010; Vladimir Paca Lezano alternate serving since June 2010	Berrios: Laboratory worker, lawyer, sociology student	MAS-IPSP
	José Santos Romero	Campesino leader, former leader of Chaunaca Subcentral of the campesion federation, and member of the Association of Milk Producers of Potolo	MAS-IPSP
	Marlene Rosales Valverde	Businesswoman and leader of Fourth Federations of Shopkeepers of Sucre.	MAS-IPSP
	Lourdes Millares	Lawyer, former national Deputy for NFR and former head of PODEMOS parliamentary delegation	Pact of Social Integration (ran with Sucre First)
Sources: "Alcalde electo en Sucre sólo tendrá cuatro concejales". Correo del Sur. 2010-04-06. "Crisis institucional se apodera del flamante gobierno municipal de Sucre". Los Tiempos. June 2, 2010. Archived from the original on June 4, 2010.
