= List of senators of Chuquisaca =

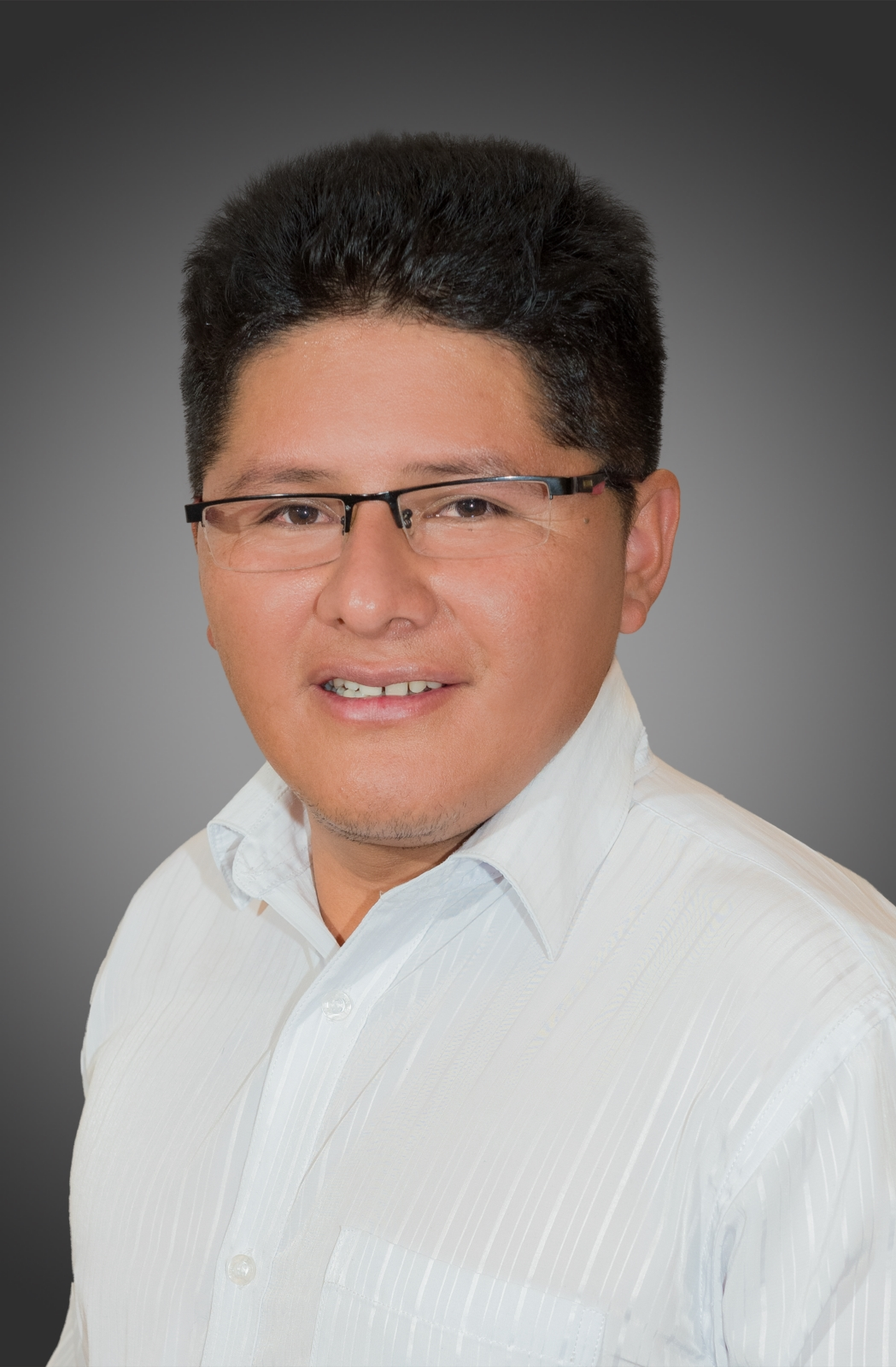
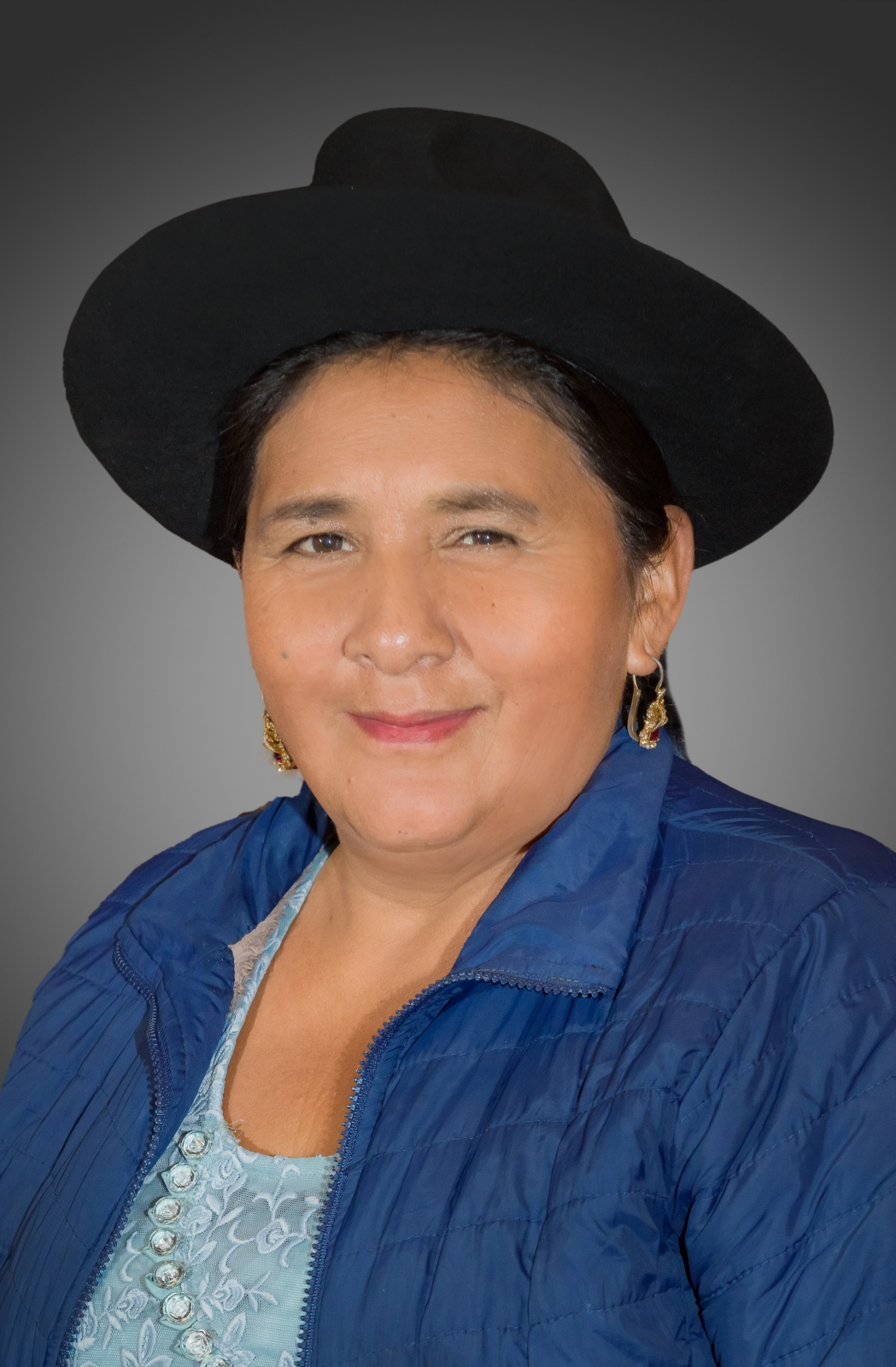
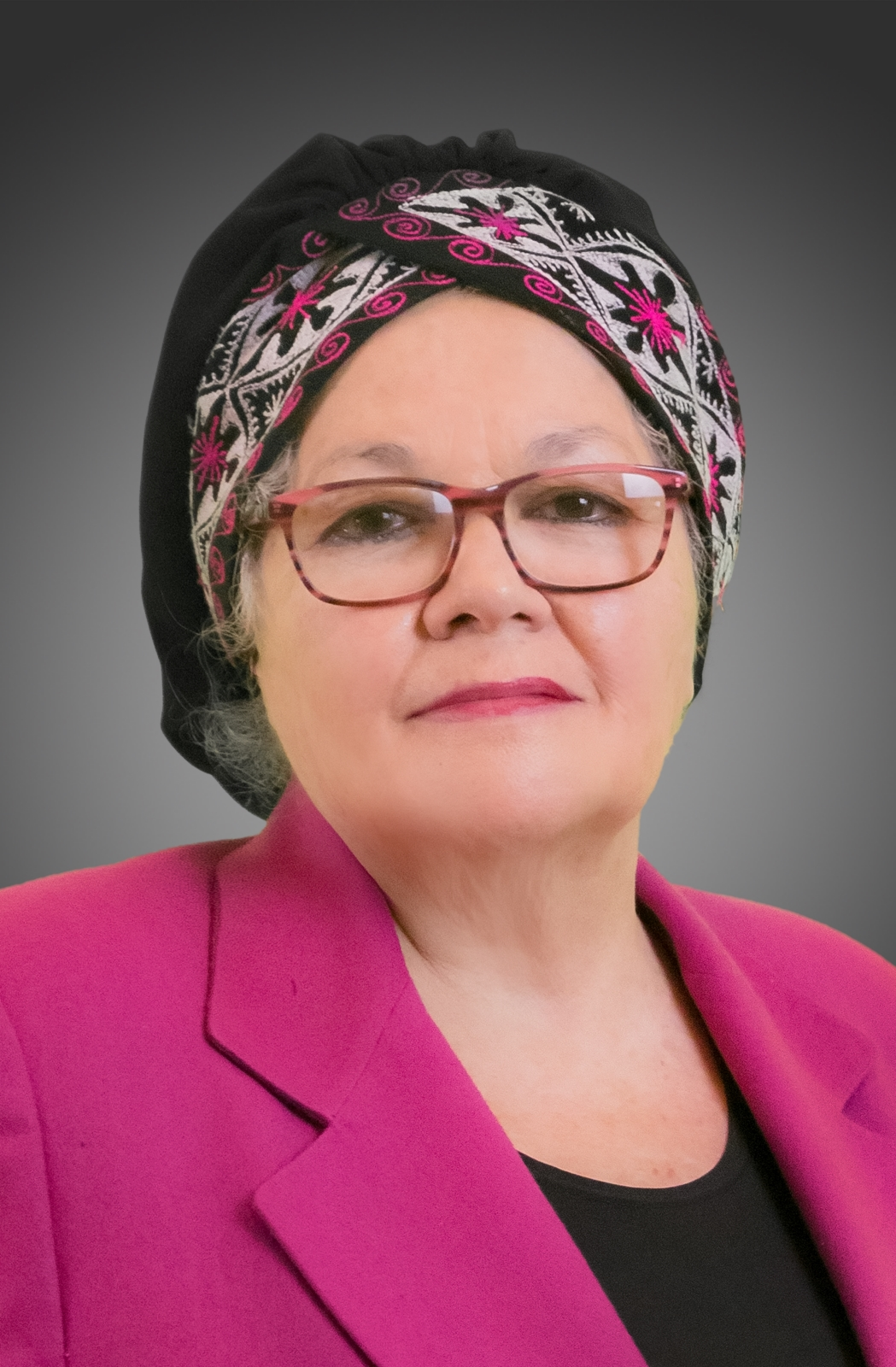
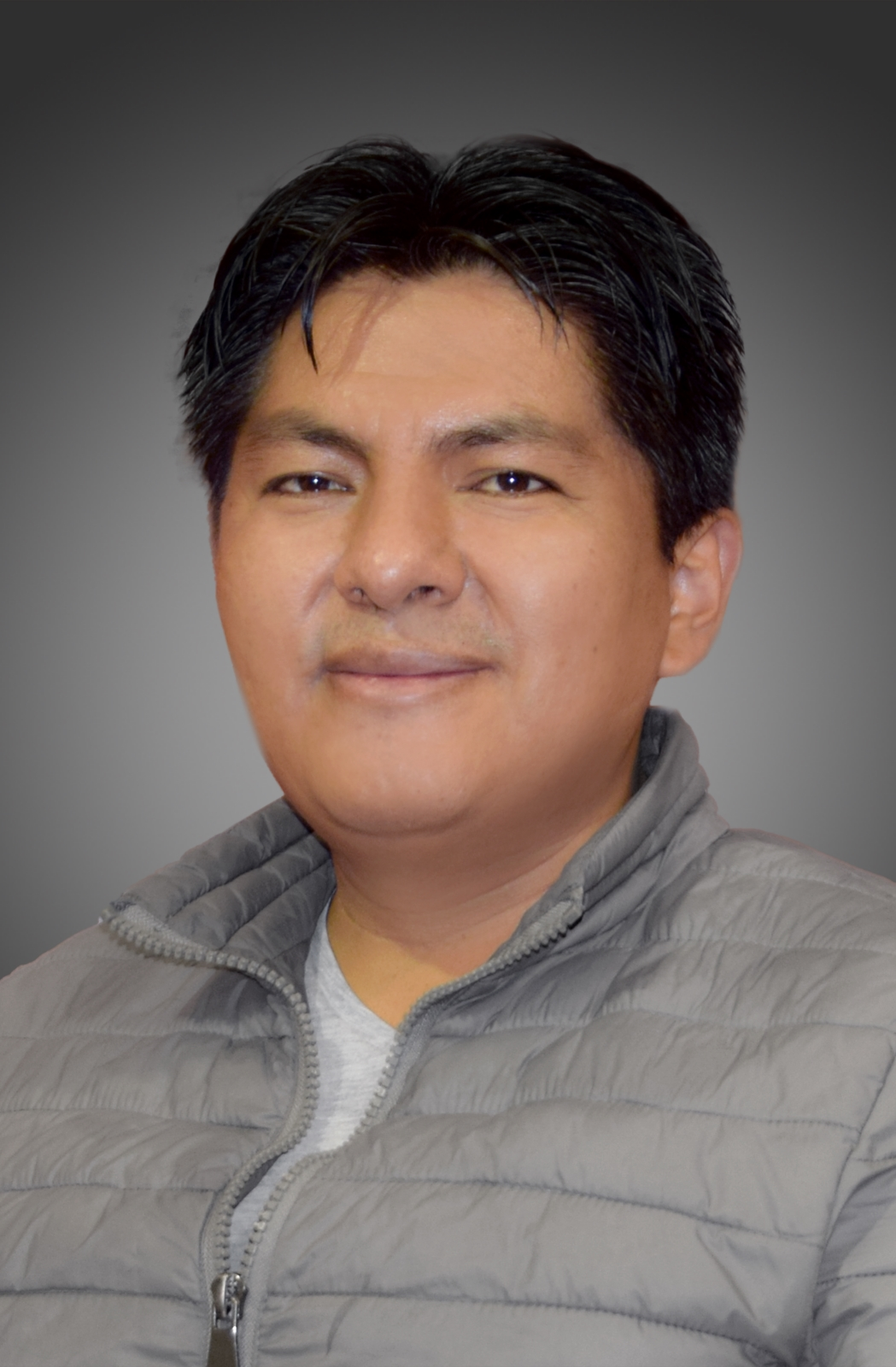
From left to right, top to bottom: Roberto Padilla (MAS), Trinidad Rocha (MAS), Silvia Salame (CC), Santiago Ticona (CC)

Chuquisaca is represented in the Plurinational Legislative Assembly by four senators and their substitutes elected through proportional representation. They serve five-year terms and qualify for reelection indefinitely. The current delegation comprises two senators from the Movement for Socialism (MAS-IPSP) and two from Civic Community (CC): Roberto Padilla, Trinidad Rocha, Silvia Salame, and Santiago Ticona. Their respective substitutes are: Laura Parraga, Germán Moscoso, Jorge Antonio Zamora, and Sarai Reinaga. Although the bicameral system was adopted in the 1831 Constitution and was maintained in subsequently promulgated constitutions, it can be affirmed that with the exception of very small intervals, the Senate did not, in fact, exercise its functions until the convocation of the 1882 legislature. Furthermore, due to heavy political instability and frequent military interventions since 1882, Bolivia did not experience a continuous, uninterrupted legislative session until 1982.

== List of senators ==
Legislature	L.	Senator	Party	Term of office		Substitute	Party	Term of office		E.	Caucus	Ref.	
Legislature	L.	Senator	Party	Took office	Left office	Substitute	Party	Took office	Left office	E.	Caucus	Sen.	Sub.
2010–2015	1°	René Martínez	MAS	19 January 2010	18 January 2015	Hilda Saavedra	MAS	19 January 2010	18 January 2015	2009	MAS		
2010–2015	2°	Nélida Sifuentes	MAS	19 January 2010	11 July 2014	Ignacio Mendoza	MAS	19 January 2010	25 July 2014	2009	MAS	(Note: Resigned to run for office.)	
2010–2015	2°	Ignacio Mendoza	MAS	25 July 2014	18 January 2015	Silvia Alarcón	MAS	5 September 2014	18 January 2015	2009	MAS		
2010–2015	3°	David Sánchez	MAS	19 January 2010	18 January 2015	Cinthia Taboada	MAS	19 January 2010	18 January 2015	2009	MAS		
2010–2015	1°	Gerald Ortiz	CST	19 January 2010	21 April 2012	Jimena Torres	CST	19 January 2010	30 May 2012	2009	CN	(Note: Partisan of CST. Died in office.)	(Note: Partisan of CST.)
2010–2015	1°	Jimena Torres	CST	30 May 2012	18 January 2015	Manuel Baptista	IND	15 August 2012	18 January 2015	2009	CN		
2015–2020	1°	Milton Barón	MAS	18 January 2015	3 November 2020	Delina Cumandiri	MAS	23 January 2015	3 November 2020	2014	MAS		
2015–2020	2°	Nélida Sifuentes	MAS	18 January 2015	23 January 2019	Valeriano Aguirre	MAS	23 January 2015	6 February 2019	2014	MAS	(Note: Resigned to become minister of productive development.)	
2015–2020	2°	Valeriano Aguirre	MAS	6 February 2019	3 November 2020	María Oporto	MAS	26 March 2019	3 November 2020	2014	MAS		
2015–2020	3°	Omar Aguilar	MAS	18 January 2015	3 November 2020	Janeth Felípez	MAS	23 January 2015	3 November 2020	2014	MAS		
2015–2020	1°	Patricia Gómez	PDC	18 January 2015	3 November 2020	Jorge Ordóñez	MNR	23 January 2015	3 November 2020	2014	PDC		(Note: Partisan of the MNR.)
2020–2025	1°	Roberto Padilla	MAS	3 November 2020	Incumbent	Laura Parraga	MAS	9 November 2020	Incumbent	2020	MAS		
2020–2025	2°	Trinidad Rocha	MAS	3 November 2020	Incumbent	Germán Moscoso	MAS	9 November 2020	Incumbent	2020	MAS		
2020–2025	1°	Silvia Salame	IND	3 November 2020	Incumbent	Jorge A. Zamora	IND	9 November 2020	Incumbent	2020	CC		
2020–2025	2°	Santiago Ticona	FRI	3 November 2020	Incumbent	Sarai Reinaga	IND	9 November 2020	Incumbent	2020	CC	(Note: Partisan of the FRI.)	
