= Mayor of Sucre, Bolivia =

The Mayor of Sucre is the head of the municipal government of Sucre municipality, located in Chuquisaca department of Bolivia. The office is elected for a term of five years by general election.

The current mayor of Sucre is Enrique Leaño, who defeated Horacio Poppe by 301 votes in the 2021 municipal election.

Date Started	Date Ended	Image	Mayor	Party	Notes
2001	January 2003		Fidel Herrera	Movimiento Bolivia Libre (MBL)	Backed by inter-party alliance.
January 2003	October 6, 2004		Aydeé Nava Andrade		
October 6, 2004	January 11, 2005		Armando Pereira Martínez	MNR	Mayor Nava was legally required to resign the office in order to campaign for re-election.
January 11, 2005	Nov 2008		Aydeé Nava Andrade	PAÍS	Elected in regional election in December 2004.
Nov 2008	May 30, 2010		Hugo Loayza	MBL	Assumed office after Nava was indicted on corruption charges
May 30, 2010	June 18, 2010		Jaime Barrón Poveda	PAÍS	Elected in regional election on April 4, 2010
June 22, 2010	January 10, 2011		Verónica Berríos	MAS-IPSP	Designated as interim Mayor by Sucre's Council in Resolution 335/10 after Barrón was indicted on charges of organizing the violence of 24 May 2008, with the support of MAS, New Citizen Alternative, and Domingo Martínez.
January 10, 2011	January 27, 2011		José Santos Romero	MAS-IPSP	Designated as interim Mayor by Sucre's Council in Resolution 03/11, with three MAS votes (but not Berríos' alternate), four PAÍS votes, and that of Lourdes Millares.
July 27, 2011	January 31, 2012		Verónica Berríos	MAS-IPSP	Restored to office when the Guarantees Tribunal of Chuquisaca's Superior Court of Justice annulled Resolution 03/11
January 31, 2012	May 25, 2015		Moisés Torres Chivé	Renewing Freedom and Democracy (LIDER)	Elected in 2011 special election
May 25, 2015	November 13, 2019		Iván Arciénega	MAS-IPSP	Elected in 2015 municipal election, defeated former mayor Jaime Barrón Poveda in elections held on March 30, 2015; he took office on May 25. Resigned in 2019 national political crisis.
November 14, 2019	May 3, 2021		Rosario López	FRI	Designated as interim Mayor by Sucre's Council.
May 3, 2021	Incumbent		Enrique Leaño	MAS-IPSP	Elected in 2021 municipal election
