= We Are All Chuquisaca =

Electoral alliance for Bolivian regional elections

We Are All Chuquisaca (Spanish: Chuquisaca Somos Todos), was an electoral alliance created for the 2010 Bolivian regional elections that were held on April 4, 2010, in Cochabamba Department, Bolivia.

== History ==
John Cava, the former president of the Chuquisaca Civic Committee, was the alliance's candidate for Governor of Chuquisaca. He came in second with 35.5% of the votes. Cava's candidacy was backed by the Nationalist Revolutionary Movement (MNR), National Unity Front (UN), and Social Alliance political parties. The alliance also received support from multiple citizen groups including Movimiento 25 de Mayo (M-25), Movimiento Poder Ciudadano (MPC), Adelante Vecinos (AV), Chuquisaca Somos Todos (CST), Acción Regional (AR), and Gente. This alliance campaigned under a registered citizen group called "Chuquisaca Somos Todos", or We Are All Chuquisaca. Members of the alliance won 4 out of the 21 seats in Chuquisaca's Departmental Legislative Assembly.

Claudia Torres became president of We Are All Chuquisaca as upheld by the Multinational Constitutional Court of Bolivia in the fall of 2015.

Since the alliance had no candidate for Mayor of Sucre, Jaime Barrón was elected mayor to avoid dividing the vote. However, Barrón resigned after he was indicted for inciting the violence that occurred in Sucre on May 24, 2008. Barron was suspended as mayor after the incitement of violence indictment and Veronica Berrios was chosen as interim mayor of Sucre in mid-June 2010 by the council. On November 15, Barrón was arrested.

After the elections, Cava registered a new political party called Alliance for Chuquisaca (Spanish: Alianza Por Chuquisaca, APCH) and included the Nationalist Revolutionary Movement (MNR), National Unity Front (UN), and the Citizen Power Movement (Spanish: Movimiento Poder Ciudadano MPC).
