= Sucre First =

Bolivian political organisation

Sucre First (Spanish: Primero Sucre) is a legally recognized but effectively inactive local political alliance in Sucre, Bolivia. The alliance is formed by two partners: Onward, Neighbors (Spanish: Adelante Vecinos) and the May 25 Movement. In the 2010 municipal elections, Sucre First won two of nine council seats. However, following the removal of Mayor Jaime Barrón, these members took different political stances. Domingo Martínez Cáceres formed a majority alliance with the Movement towards Socialism and the New Citizen Alternative, making him the President of the Council. He now affiliates with Onward, Neighbors. Meanwhile, Sucre First councilwoman Lourdes Millares joined the Pact of Social Integration (PAÍS) block.
