= Mercado Campesino =

Largest marketplace in Sucre, Bolivia

The Mercado Campesino is the largest marketplace in Sucre, Bolivia. It has been operating for 26 years, and continues to expand with the popularity of market culture in Bolivia. The name of the market, in Spanish, literally means "market of the people from the countryside". This is because many of the products are grown or manufactured outside of the city.

The market is also the most common place for country or indigenous people to conduct their business in Sucre. With a population of 300,000, approximately 20,000 people from Sucre work in association with the Mercardo Campesino each day. The majority of the market operates out of lightly constructed, semi-mobile and mobile stalls that sit directly on the street. Some vendors operate out of backpacks and suitcases.

Despite being outside the central area of town, the Mercardo is visited more than any other location in Sucre. Market traffic varies during the week. Saturdays are the most popular. On the weekend, it is common for family members to visit the market together as a form of leisure. Each year, tourism grows in Sucre, but the Mercado Campesino remains almost exclusive to working class locals.
