= Charca people =

Indigenous ethnic group in Bolivia

The Charca villagers were an Aymara speaking indigenous ethnic group who lived in what is today Chuquisaca Department in Bolivia. Before the 15th century they were subjects of the Inca Empire. They regularly suffered from invasions of the Ava Guaraní people ("Chiriguano", who spoke a Tupian language) that inhabited the Chuquisaca Department of Bolivia prior to the arrival of the Spaniards. They also suffered from incursions of the Chiriguanos.

Portuguese castaway Aleixo Garcia is believed to be the first European to make contact with the Charcas, in the year 1525.

The city of Sucre was founded in 1538 in the land of the Charcas.

== See also ==
- Aymara people
- Aymara language
