= Alliance for Chuquisaca =

Alliance for Chuquisaca (Spanish: Alianza Por Chuquisaca, APCH) is an electoral alliance in Chuquisaca department created in May 2010. It emerged from Jhon Cava's unsuccessful candidacy for Governor of Chuquisaca under the electoral line We Are All Chuquisaca. Following the elections, Jhon Cava headed a process involving over 100 founders to register a new political party which includes Nationalist Revolutionary Movement (MNR), National Unity Front (UN), and the Citizen Power Movement (Spanish: Movimiento Poder Ciudadano MPC). Cava stated that the ideological foundations of the party include loyalty, democracy, liberty, and defense of the sacred interests of Chuquisaca.
