= Nélida Sifuentes =

Bolivian politician (born 1981)

Nélida Sifuentes Cueto
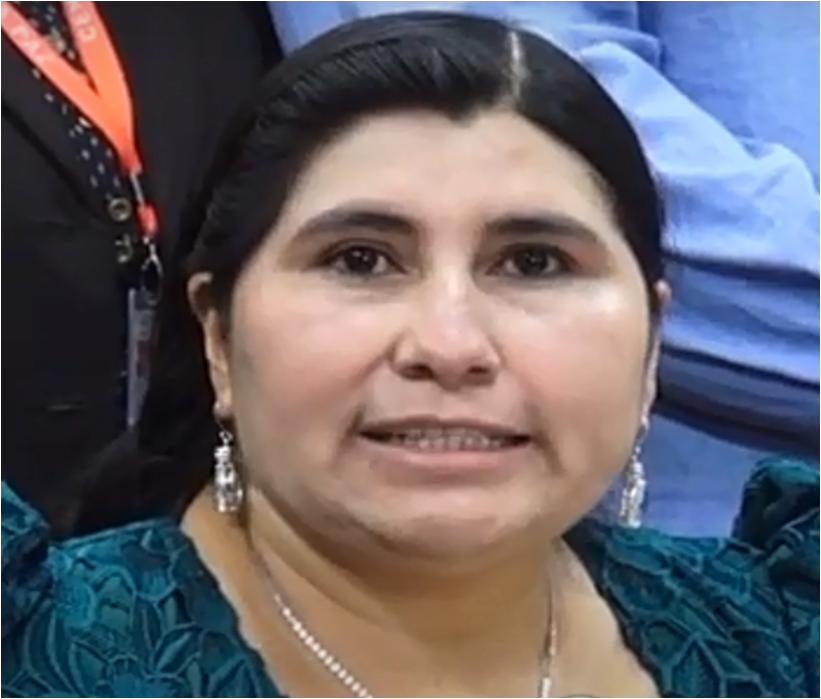

Vice President of the Chamber of Senators

Senator for Chuquisaca
- In office 19 January 2010 – 23 January 2019
- Alternate: Valeriano Aguirre

Personal details
- Born: Nélida Sifuentes; 18 July 1981 (age 44) Chuquisaca, Bolivia
- Party: Movement for Socialism

Nélida Sifuentes Cueto (born 1981) is a Bolivian politician and a union leader of the indigenous peasant movement. She was elected in 2009 to the Bolivian Senate, and in 2013 she served as first vice-president of the Senate.

== Biography ==
Nélida Sifuentes was born in Chuquisaca on 18 July 1981. At the age of 15 she was an ACLO radio reporter in Chuquisaca, becoming chair of a departmental association of reporters, and was later a community leader in the canton of de:Tarabuquillo. She held executive positions in Tomina province (2003) and in the prefecture of Chuquisaca (2006), and from 2004 to 2006 was general secretary of the indigenous organization Federación Única de Pueblos Originarios de Chuquisaca (F.U.T.P.O.CH.).

In 2009 she was elected Senator for the Movimiento al Socialismo (MAS - IPSP) party, representing the department of Chuquisaca in the Plurinational Legislative Assembly of Bolivia. She was chair (2014–15) and secretary (2017–18) of the Senate committee on land, natural resources and environment, and has been instrumental in implementing a cybersecurity strategy for the Bolivian state.
