= Pact of Social Integration =

Political party in Bolivia

The Pact of Social Integration is a local, right-wing political party in Sucre and several other municipalities of Chuquisaca department, Bolivia. Party members Aydeé Nava and Jaime Barrón Poveda are former mayors of the city. Currently, the party effectively has five members of the 11-member Sucre council:

Office	Council Member	Biography	Party
Vice President	Germán Gutiérrez Gantier	Lawyer, former mayor of Sucre, former national deputy, former member of the Judicial Council, docent	Pact of Social Integration
	Nelson Guzmán Fernández	Communicator, law student, leader of Federación Universitaria Local and the University Club.	Pact of Social Integration
	Susy Barrios Quiroz	Psychologist, former Sub-Mayor of Districts 2 and 5, President of Feminine Civic Committee of Chuquisaca	Pact of Social Integration
	Norma Rojas Salazar	Executive Secretary of Bolivian Red Cross and neighborhood leader	Pact of Social Integration
	Lourdes Millares	Lawyer, former national Deputy for NFR and former head of PODEMOS parliamentary delegation	Pact of Social Integration (ran with Sucre First)
Sources: "Alcalde electo en Sucre sólo tendrá cuatro concejales". Correo del Sur. 2010-04-06. "Crisis institucional se apodera del flamante gobierno municipal de Sucre". Los Tiempos. 2010-06-02. Archived from the original on 2010-06-04.
