= 2008 Sucre clashes =

Violent confrontation in Chuquisaca, Bolivia

On 24 May 2008, the city of Sucre, Bolivia, experienced clashes, hostage-taking, assaults, and alleged public humiliation against primarily indigenous rural leaders and their supporters. The events arose from an announced visit from President Evo Morales, during which he was scheduled to preside over the donation of ambulances to the rural municipalities of Chuquisaca, the department of which Sucre is the capital.

Prior to the planned visit, the civic movement led by the Inter-Institutional Committee and the Chuquisaca Civic Committee demanded that Morales apologize to the families of three Sucre residents who were killed in the November 2007 clashes outside the final meetings of the Bolivian Constituent Assembly. These organizations planned disruptive protests of Morales' visit. However, under pressure from the protests, Morales decided on May 24 not to attend the presentation.

Participants in the civic movement protests then engaged in street clashes with peasants that came to Sucre to counter the local protestors. During the afternoon, several dozen indigenous peasants were marched by civic movement protesters to Sucre's central square, the Plaza 25 de Mayo. There, they were punched, threatened, forced to strip off their shirts and kneel, subjected to alleged racist insults, and supposedly publicly humiliated in various ways.

The incident heightened political and racial tensions in Bolivia, then in the midst of a political conflict between Morales and the CONALDE group of governors. On the second anniversary of the violence, May 24, 2010, the first public draft of Bolivia's Law Against Racism was presented. In May 2011, Bolivia's Law 139 established May 24 as Bolivia's National Day against Racism and All Forms of Discrimination.

== Trial ==
A large number of officials in the Inter-Institutional Committee and Sucre's municipal government were indicted for conspiring in the violence in April and May 2010. Former Inter-Institutional Committee president Jaime Barrón, who had recently been elected mayor, was suspended by the City Council and later resigned in the wake of the indictments., however the trials advanced slowly. An initial trial, held in Sucre, was dissolved in August 2012 after two of the presiding judges resigned from the case. A second trial was then held in the town of Padilla.

The trial of fourteen people accused of orchestrating or participating in the May 24 violence ended in March 2016. Prosecutor Lisandro Álvarez sought 15 year sentences for the defendants, and the victims asked for 30 years. The verdicts and sentences issued by judge Hoffman Padilla Blacutt were as shown below. All sentences will be discounted for time already served in jail. On November 11, 2016, the Departmental Tribunal of Justice ruled on an appeal by the defendants, extending these sentences in 10 of the 13 cases.

Accused	Position in May 2008	Verdict	Sentence by Judge Padilla	Sentence by Departmental Tribunal
Jaime Barrón	President, Inter-Institutional Committee	Guilty of criminal conspiracy (coautores de Associación Delictuosa)	6 years imprisonment	7 years, 6 months imprisonment
Jhon Cava	Former president, Civic Committee	Guilty of criminal conspiracy	6 years imprisonment	7 years, 6 months imprisonment
Savina Cuéllar	Candidate for Prefect, Inter-Institutional Committee Alliance Party	Guilty of criminal conspiracy	6 years imprisonment	7 years, 6 months imprisonment
Fidel Herrera	Municipal Council Member	Guilty of criminal conspiracy	6 years imprisonment	7 years, 6 months imprisonment
Aydeé Nava	Mayor of Sucre	Guilty of criminal conspiracy	6 years imprisonment	7 years, 6 months imprisonment
Epifania Terrazas		Guilty of criminal conspiracy	6 years imprisonment	7 years, 6 months imprisonment
Jamill Pillco	Student leader, San Francisco Xavier University	Guilty of criminal conspiracy	6 years imprisonment	7 years, 6 months imprisonment
Juan Antonio Jesús		Guilty of criminal conspiracy	6 years imprisonment	7 years, 6 months imprisonment
Álvaro Ríos		Guilty of criminal conspiracy	6 years imprisonment	7 years, 6 months imprisonment
Franz Quispe	University leader	Guilty of criminal conspiracy Acquitted of attempted homicide	6 years imprisonment	7 years, 6 months imprisonment
Cristian Flores		Guilty of serious assault (lesiones graves)	6 years, 3 months, 3 days imprisonment	Confirmed existing sentence
Juan C. Zambrana		Guilty of serious assault	6 years, 3 months, 3 days imprisonment	Confirmed existing sentence
Flavio Huallpa Flores		Guilty of fabricating, selling, or possessing explosives.	3 years	
Rodrigo Anzaldo		Acquitted.		
