= Sucre =

Sucre Sukri, Chuquisaca, Charcas
- Capital city
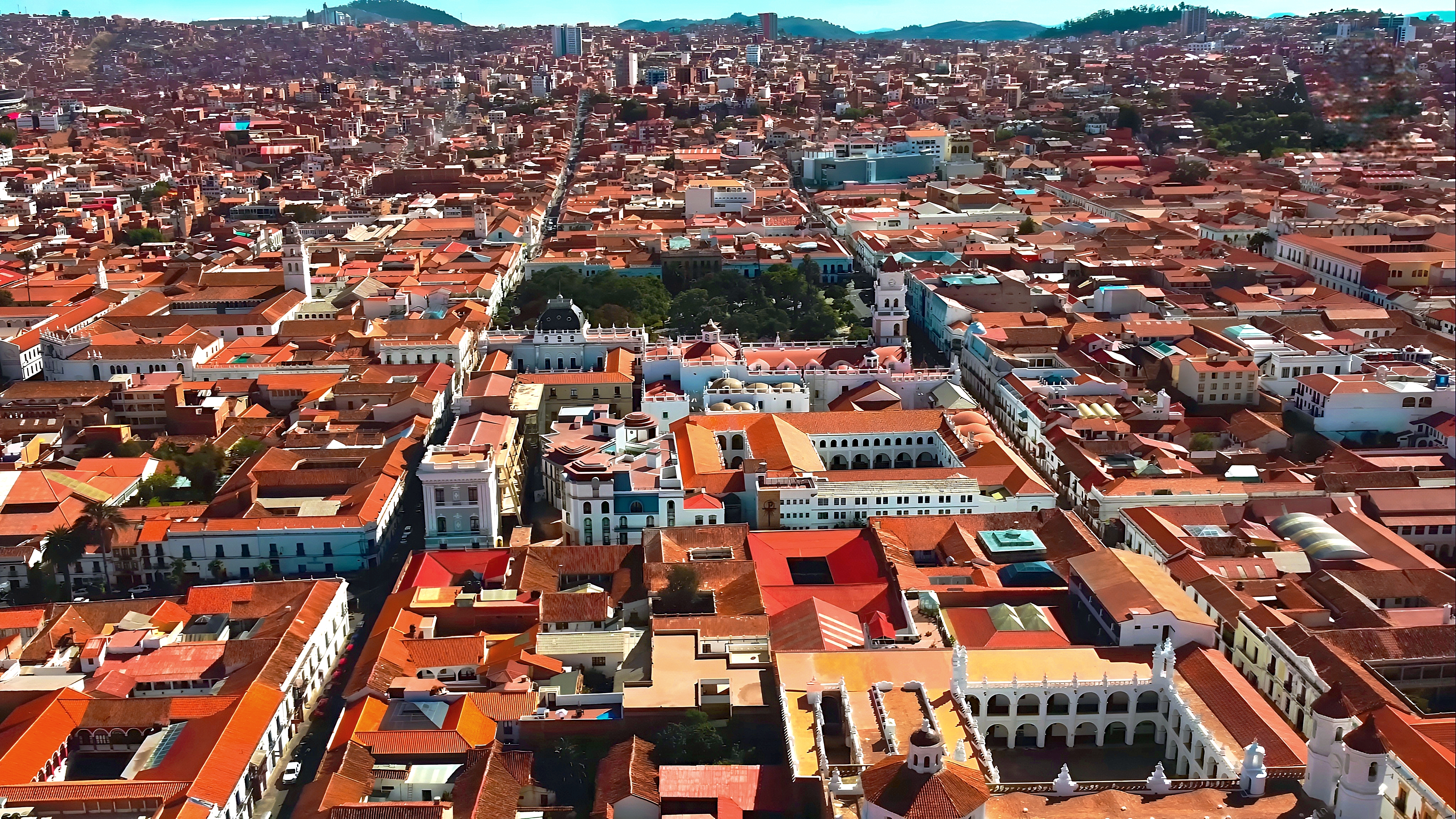
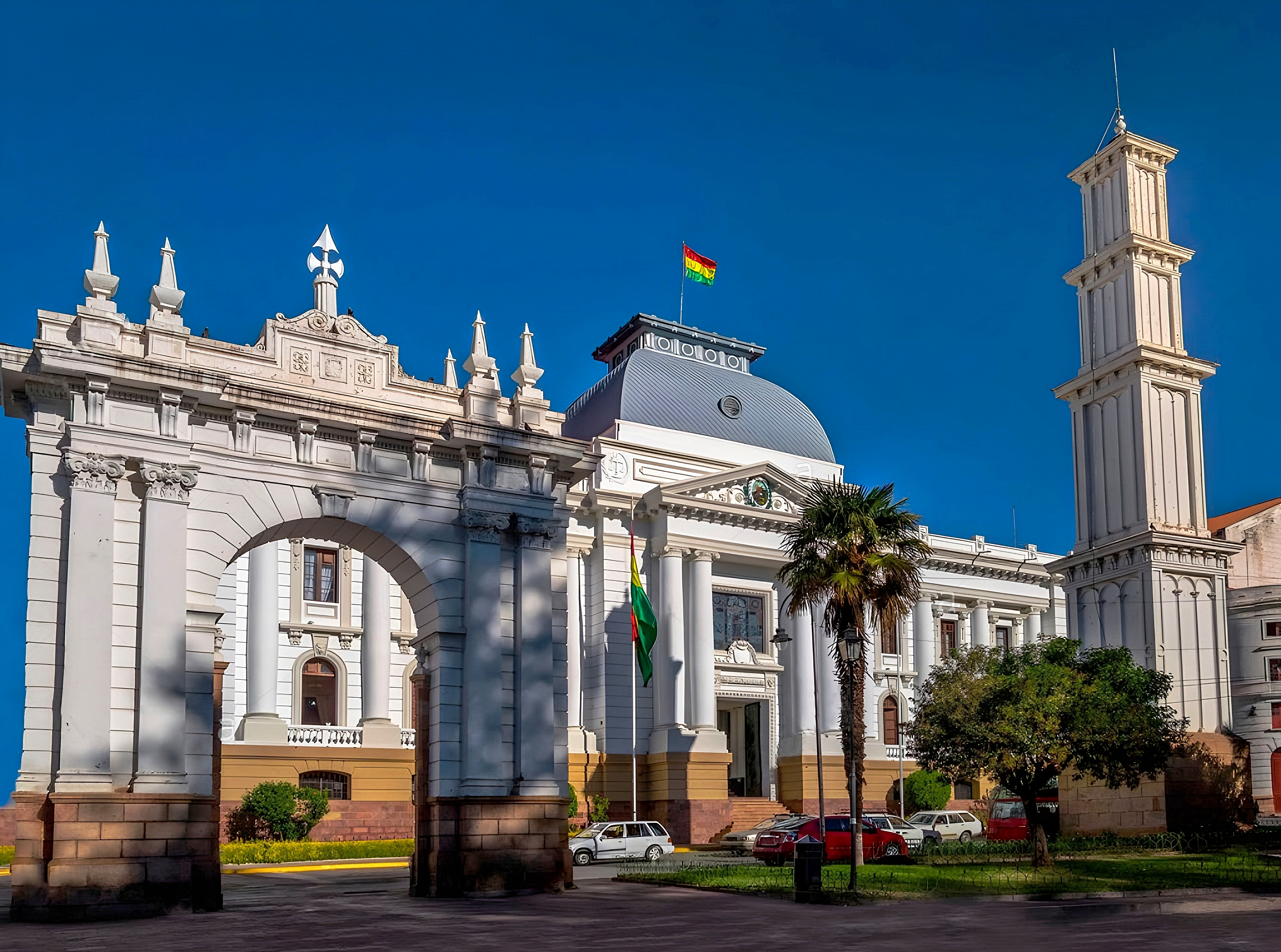
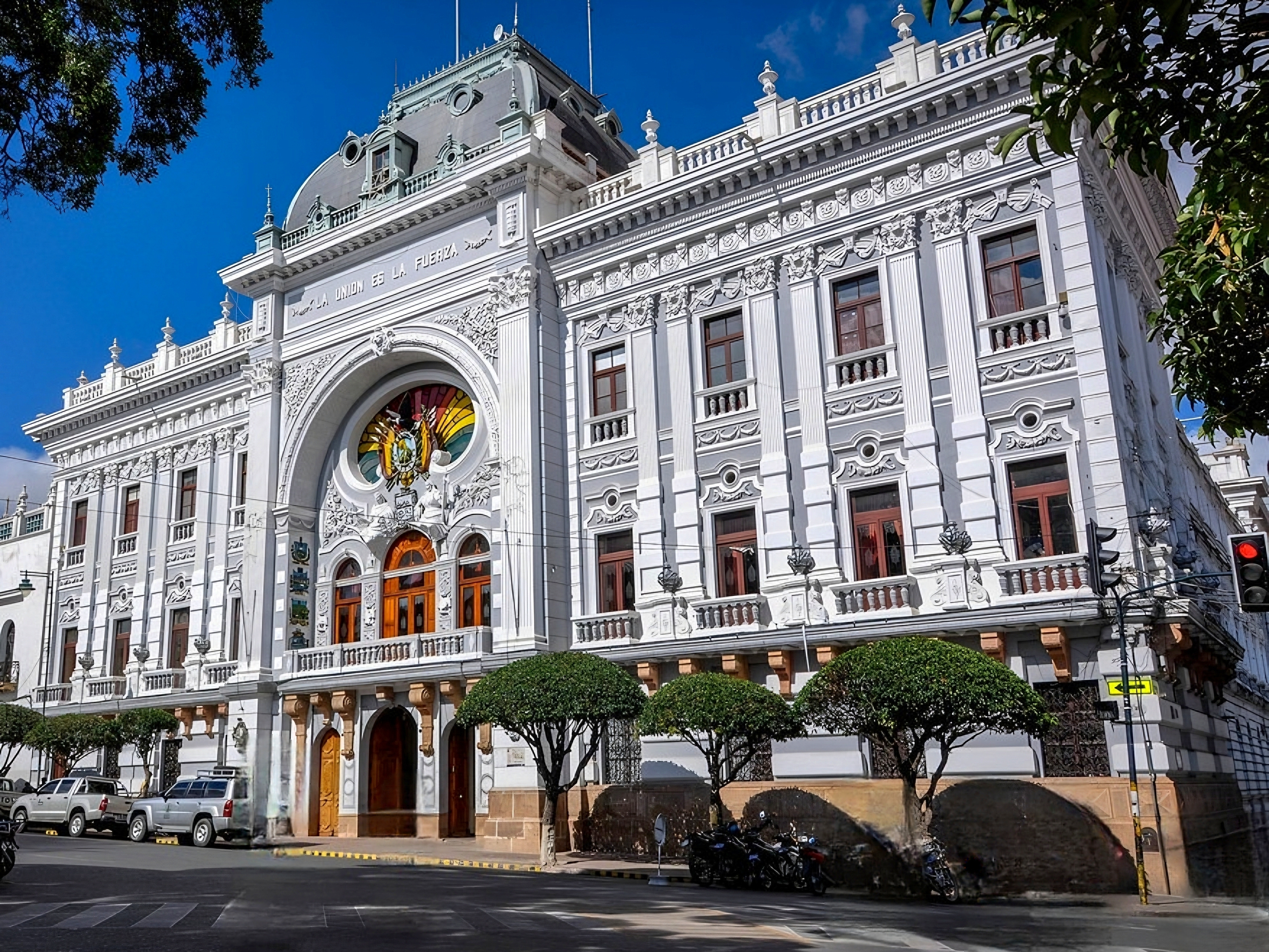
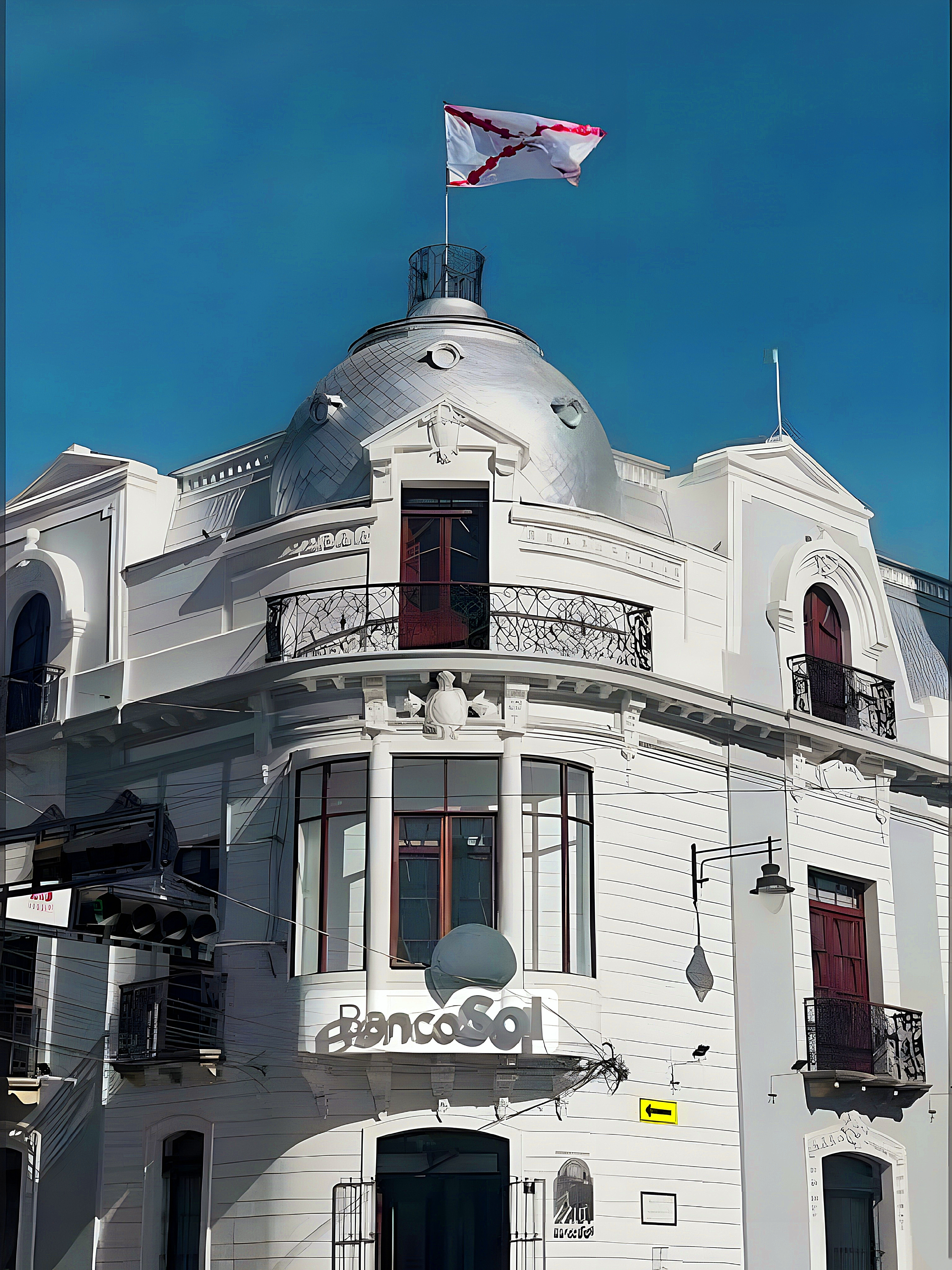
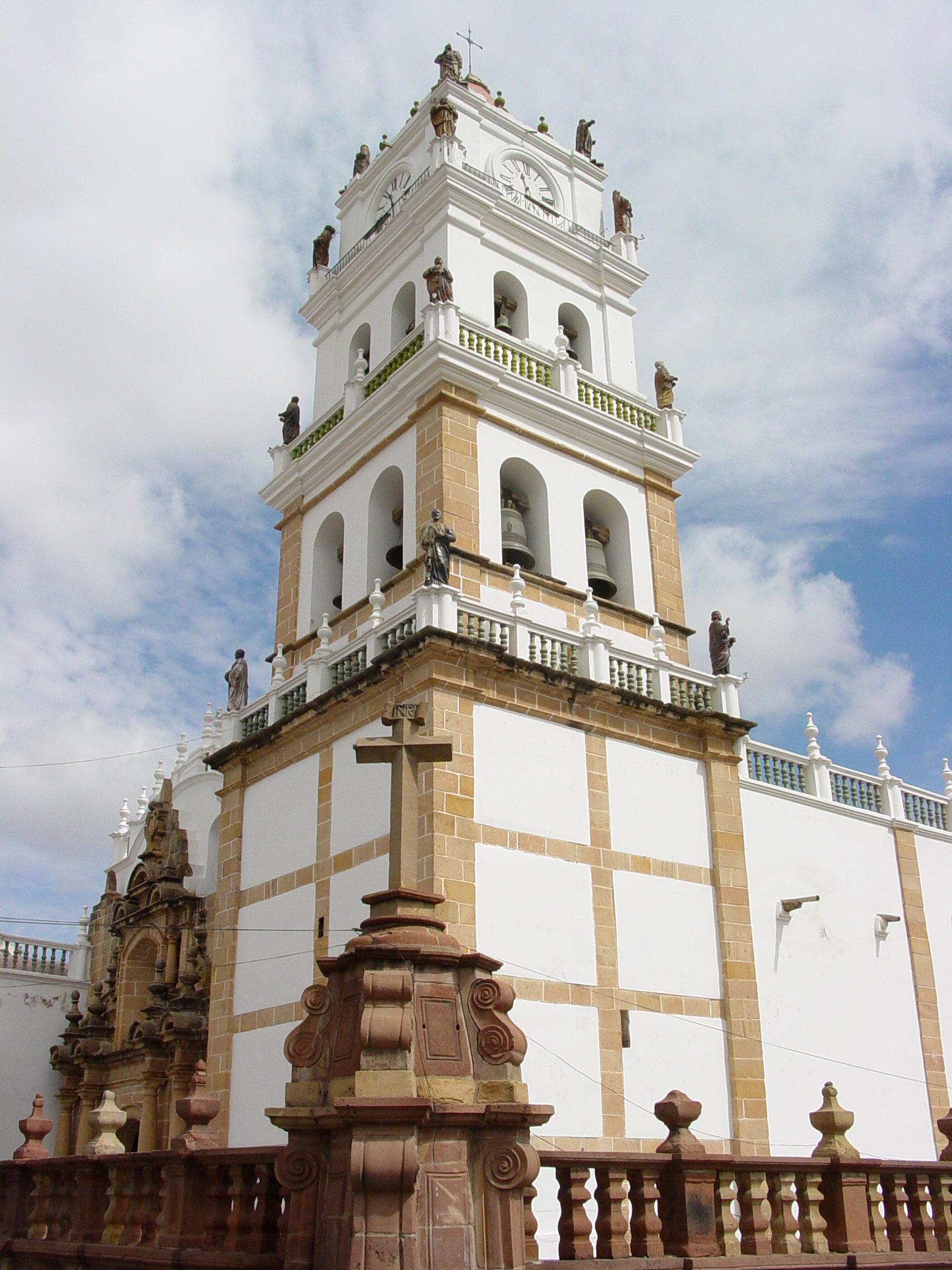
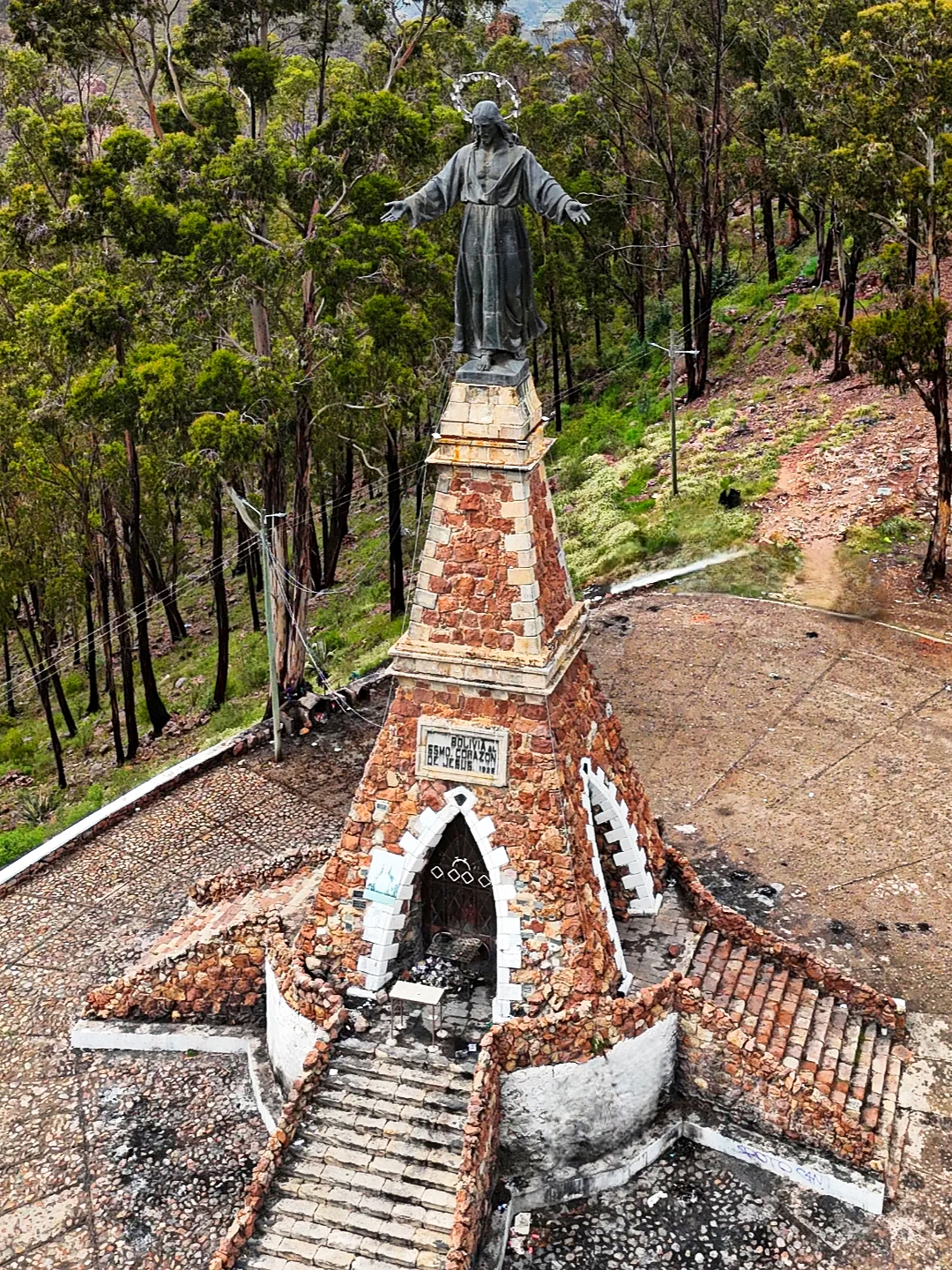
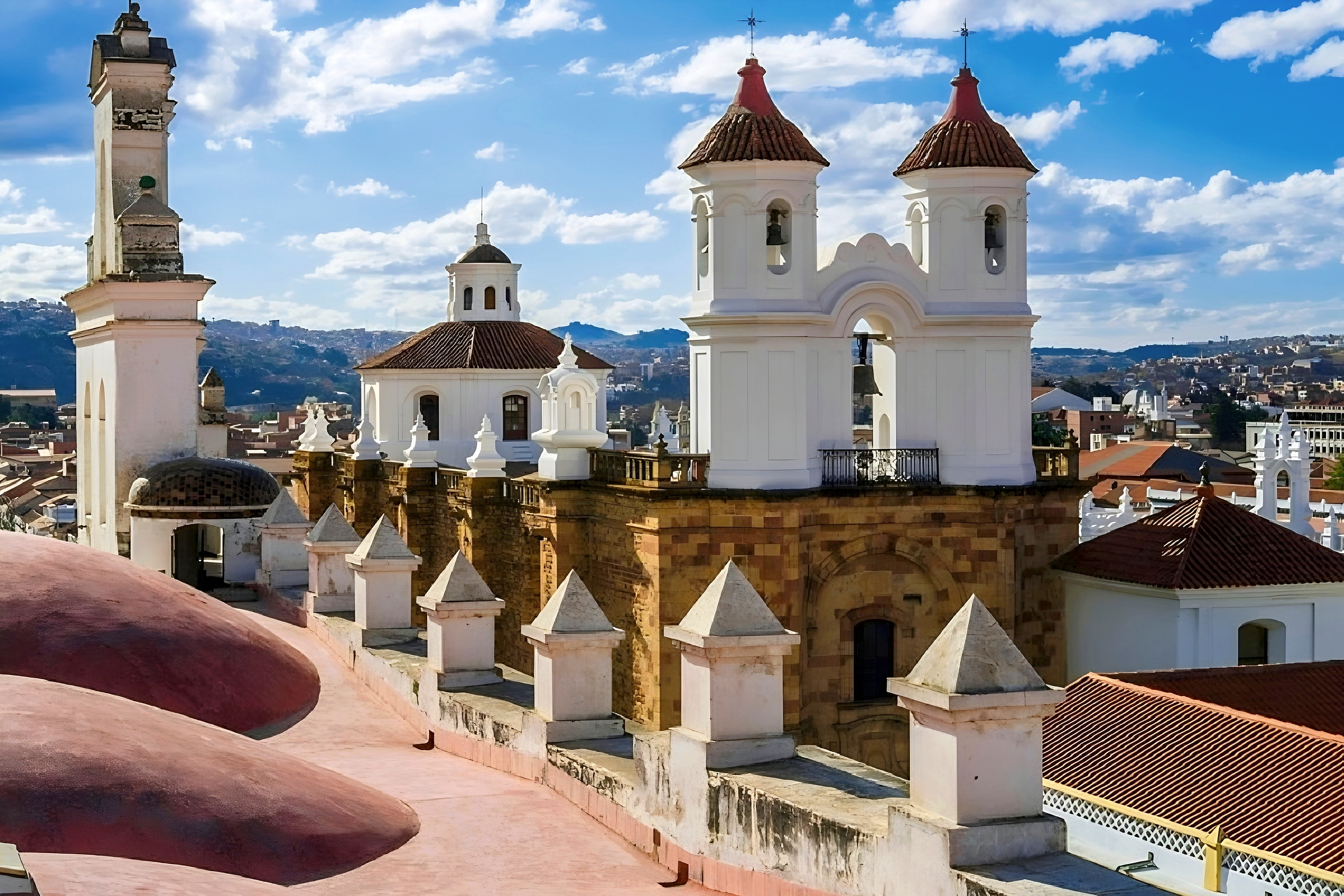
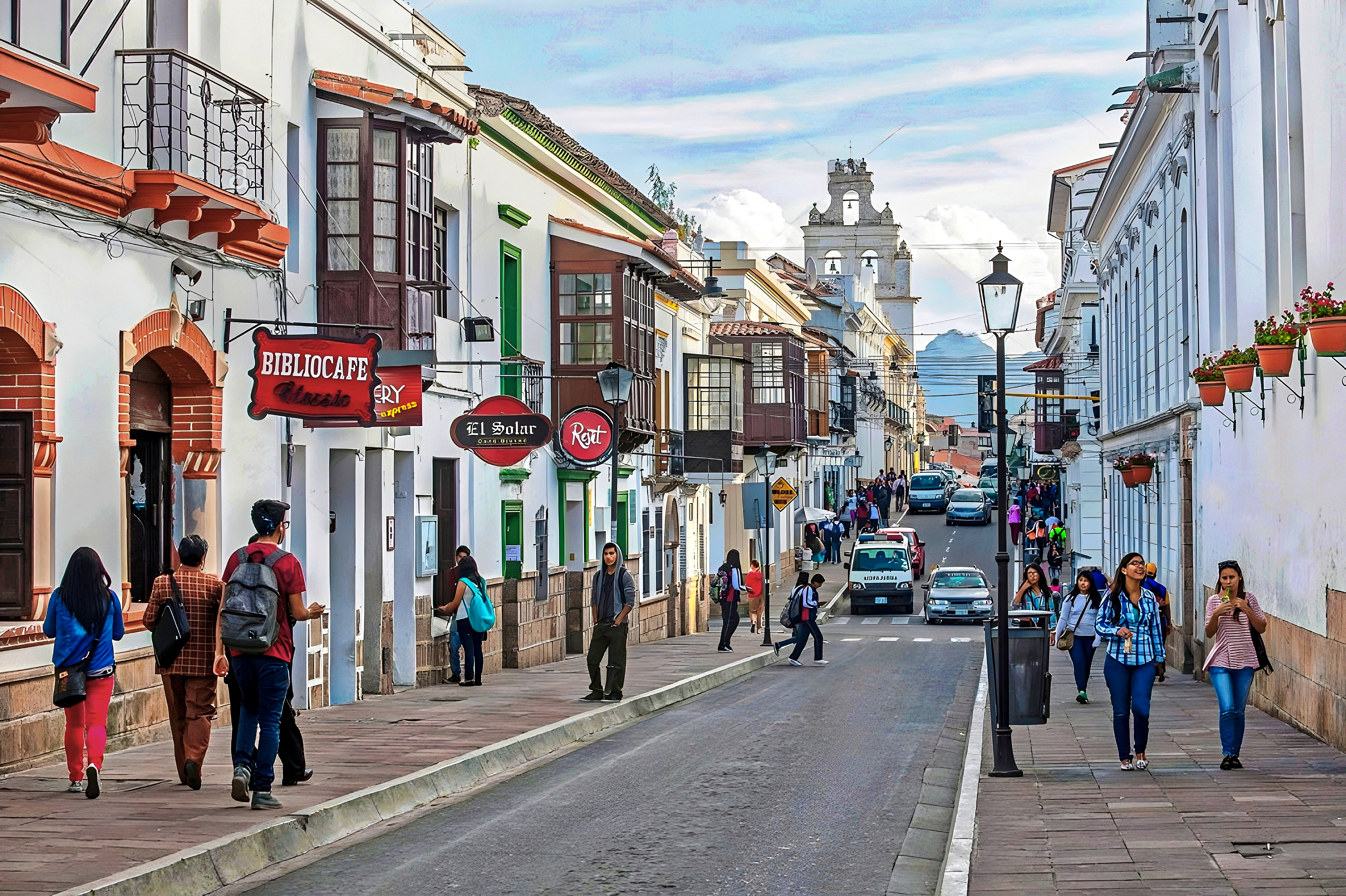
- Panoramic view Supreme Court of Justice Government Palace Banco Sol Building Metropolitan Cathedral Sacred Heart of Jesus Convent of San Felipe de Neri Typical street of Sucre

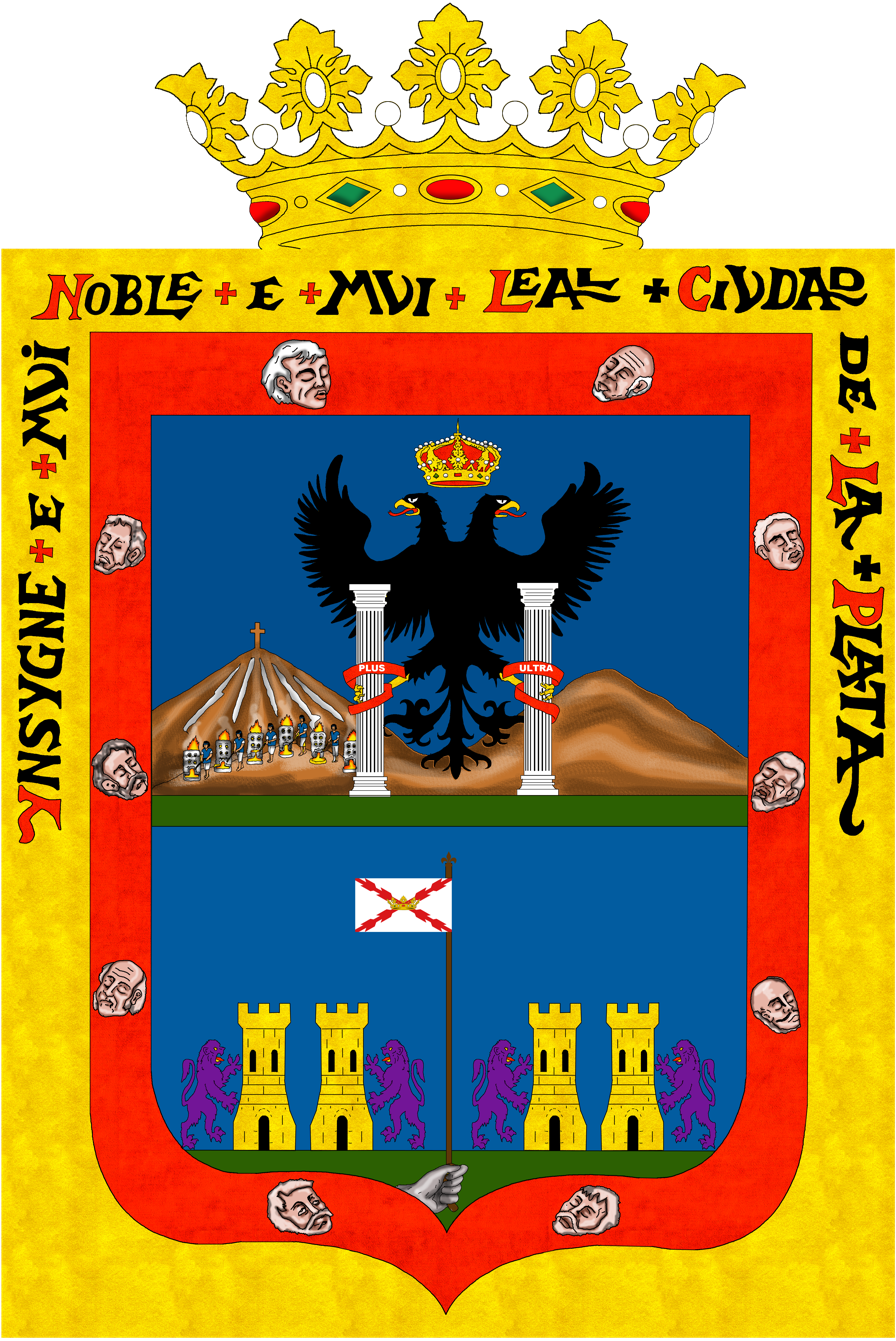
- Flag Seal
- Nickname(s): La Ciudad de los cuatro Nombres (The City of the four names); Ciudad Blanca de América (White City of America); Ilustre Ciudad (llustrious City)
- Motto: Aqui nació la Libertad (Freedom was born here)
- Location within Bolivia Location within South America
- Coordinates: 19°02′51″S 65°15′36″W
- Country: Bolivia
- Department: Chuquisaca Department
- Province: Oropeza Province
- Founded: 1538: Pre-Hispanic Times: Charcas; September 29, 1538 (official): La Plata de la Nueva Toledo (City of The Silver of the New Toledo); August 6, 1826: Sucre (Capital Section)
- Founder: Pedro Anzúres as "La Plata"
- Named for: Antonio José de Sucre

Government
  - Type: C.S. Municipal Autonomous Government
  - Mayor: Fátima Tardío Quiroga

Area
  - Total: 1,768 km^{2} (683 sq mi)
- Elevation: 2,790 m (9,150 ft)

Population (2024 census)
  - Total: 296,125
  - Rank: 6th
  - Density: 167.5/km^{2} (433.8/sq mi)
- Demonym(s): Capitalino (a); Sucrense
- Time zone: UTC−04:00 (BOT)
- Area code: (+591) 4
- Climate: Cwb
- Website: www.sucre.bo

UNESCO World Heritage Site
- Official name: Historic City of Sucre
- Criteria: Cultural: iv
- Reference: 566
- Inscription: 1991 (15th Session)

Sucre (Spanish pronunciation: [ˈsukɾe]; Quechua: Chuqichaka; Aymara: Sukri; Guarani: Sucre), officially La Ilustre y Heroica Sucre ("The Illustrious and Heroic Sucre") is the de jure capital city of Bolivia, the capital of the Chuquisaca Department and the sixth most populous city in Bolivia. Located in the south-central part of the country, Sucre lies at an elevation of 2,790 m (9,150 ft), making it the second-highest capital city in the world after Quito. (Note: If La Paz is included, then Sucre would be in third place after Quito) This relatively high altitude gives the city a subtropical highland climate with cool temperatures year-round. Over the centuries, the city has received various names, including La Plata, Charcas, and Chuquisaca. Today, the region is of predominantly Quechua background, with some Aymara communities and influences.

Sucre holds major national importance and is an educational and government center, as well as the location of the Bolivian Supreme Court. Its pleasant climate and low crime rates have made the city popular amongst foreigners and Bolivians alike. Notably, Sucre contains one of the best preserved Hispanic colonial and republican historic city centres in the Western Hemisphere - similar to cities such as Cuzco and Quito. This architectural heritage and the millenarian history of the Charcas region has led to Sucre's designation as a UNESCO World Heritage Site. The city has held an important place in Bolivian history from its place as an important center in the Real Audencia de Charcas, and later as the first capital of Bolivia before the fall of silver's importance as a global mineral commodity. Some regional tension remains from the historical transfer of capital functions to La Paz, and even today the issue features an important role in local culture and political ideology.

== History ==
Prior to Spanish colonization, Sucre was an Inca town called Chuquisaca, a name that remains an alternative designation for the city today. The name Chuquisaca possibly derives from the Quechua words chuqi, meaning 'precious metal' or 'silver', and shaqa or saqa, meaning 'abundance', 'a heap', or 'a pile of small things', thus translating to 'a heap of precious metal' or 'a pile of silver'.

Chuquisaca was the provincial capital of the wamani of Charca, established after Topa Inka Yupanqui conquered the Aymara kingdom that originally occupied the area and imposed the Quechua language on them. According to Inca Garcilaso de la Vega, the Inca ruler received ambassadors from the kingdom of Tucman (Tucumán) while in Charca. Due to their warrior background, the Charcas were excluded from various state duties and many served as soldiers, being recruited in large numbers by Wayna Qhapaq for northern campaigns. During Wayna Qhapaq's wars in modern-day Ecuador, the Guarani-speaking Chiriguanos from Paraguay invaded the Charcas frontier, aided by a band of European explorers. Although the Chiriguanos were repelled by commanders sent by Wayna Qhapaq from Quito, the Portuguese conquistador Aleixo Garcia is believed to be the first European to make contact with Charcas in 1525.

Although the Inca territories south of Cusco were assigned to the head conquistador Diego de Almagro, there is no record of him visiting Chuquisaca and the Charcas territory during his 1535 expedition to Collasuyo. After Almagro's murder in 1538, Francisco Pizarro, sent his brothers Gonzalo Pizarro and Hernando Pizarro to Charcas to claim the region. Hernando Pizarro traveled to Chuquisaca along with the Emperor Paullu Inca. During their visit, they met with Consara, the principal lord of the Charcas region. Consara provided crucial information about the resources of Charca, including silver mines in Porco, gold mines in Chiutamarca, copper mines in Aytacara, and tin mines in Chayanta. The settlement was briefly occupied by Diego Méndez, under the orders of Diego de Almagro II, during Almagro II's uprising against Pizarro and the Spanish government.

The Spanish foundation of Sucre occurred on November 30, 1538, under the name Ciudad de la Plata de la Nueva Toledo (City of Silver of New Toledo) by Pedro Anzures, Marqués de Campo Redondo. In 1559, the Spanish King Philip II established the Audiencia de Charcas in La Plata with authority over an area which covers what is now Paraguay, southeastern Peru, northern Chile and Argentina, and much of Bolivia. The Real Audiencia of Charcas was a subdivision of the Viceroyalty of Peru until 1776, when it was transferred to the newly created Viceroyalty of the Río de la Plata. In 1601 the Recoleta Monastery was founded by the Franciscans. In 1609, an archbishopric was founded in the city. In 1624 St Francis Xavier University of Chuquisaca was founded.

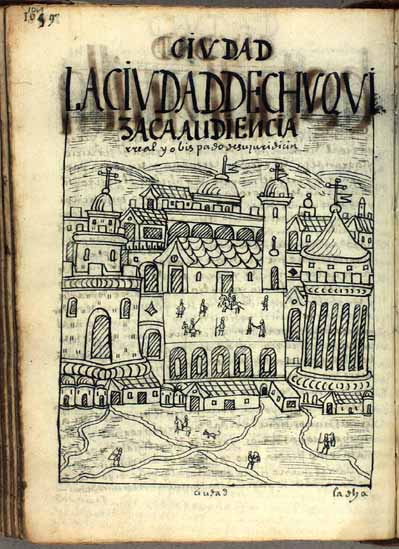
Chuquisaca -as was its colonial name- in 1615 by the Inca painter Guamán Poma in his work "Nueva corónica y buen gobierno". Royal Library, Denmark.

Very much a Spanish city during the colonial era, the narrow streets of the city centre are organised in a grid, reflecting the Andalusian culture that is embodied in the architecture of the city's great houses, convents and churches. Sucre remains the seat of the Roman Catholic Church in Bolivia, and a common sight is members of religious orders dressed in traditional habit. For much of its colonial history, Sucre's temperate climate was preferred by the Spanish royalty and wealthy families involved in silver trade coming from Potosí. Sucre's University (Universidad Mayor Real y Pontificia de San Francisco Xavier de Chuquisaca) is one of the oldest universities in the new world.

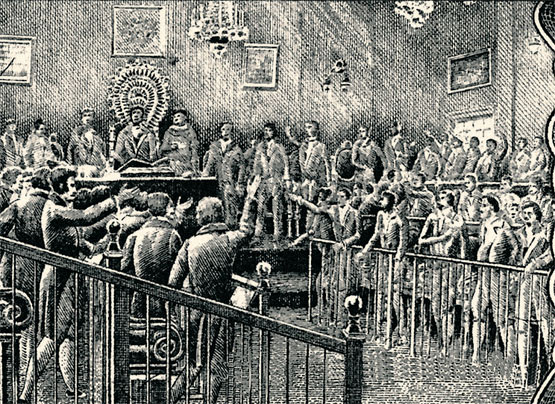
The Independence Hall of the House of Liberty during the National Constituent Congress in Chuquisaca.

On May 25, 1809, the Bolivian independence movement was started with the ringing of the bell of the Basilica of Saint Francisco. This bell was rung to the point of breakage, but it can still be found in the Basilica today: it is one of the most precious relics of the city. Until the 19th century, La Plata was the judicial, religious and cultural centre of the region. It was proclaimed provisional capital of the newly independent Upper Peru (later, Bolivia) in July 1826. On July 12, 1839, President José Miguel de Velasco proclaimed a law naming the city as the capital of Bolivia, and renaming it in honor of the revolutionary leader Antonio José de Sucre. After the economic decline of Potosí and its silver industry, the Bolivian seat of government was moved from Sucre to La Paz in 1898. Some argue Sucre was the location of the beginning of the Latin American independence movement against Spain. From that point of view, Bolivia was the last Spanish imperial territory in South America to gain its independence, in 1825. In 1991, Sucre became a UNESCO World Heritage Site.

== Government ==
Together with La Paz, Sucre is one of two governmental centers of Bolivia: It is the seat of the judiciary, where the Supreme Court of Justice is located. As designated in the Constitution of Bolivia, Sucre is the true capital of the nation, while La Paz is the seat of government. Sucre is also the capital city of the department of Chuquisaca. The government of the City of Sucre is divided into executive and legislative branches. The Mayor of Sucre is the executive head of the city government, elected for a term of five years by general election. The legislative branch consists of the Municipal Council, which elects a President, Vice President and Secretary from a group of eleven members.

Date Began	Date Ended	Mayor	Party	Notes
	February 7, 2000	Germán Gutiérrez Santier	MNR, PS1	
February 7, 2000	January 8, 2003	Fidel Herrera Ressini	MBL	Resigned in intra-party move.
January 8, 2003	October 5, 2004	Aydeé Nava Andrade	MBL	
October 5, 2004	January 10, 2005	Armando Pereira	MNR	Interim mayor while Nava ran in election.
January 10, 2005	Nov 2008	Aydeé Nava Andrade	MBL	Elected in 2004.
Nov 2008	May 30, 2010	Hugo Loayza	MBL	Assumed office after Nava was indicted on corruption charges.
May 30, 2010	June 18, 2010	Jaime Barrón Poveda	PAÍS	Elected in regional election on April 4, 2010
June 22, 2010	January 10, 2011	Verónica Berríos	MAS-IPSP	Designated as interim Mayor by Sucre's Council in Resolution 335/10 after Barrón was indicted on charges of organizing the violence of 24 May 2008, with the support of MAS, New Citizen Alternative, and Domingo Martínez.
January 10, 2011	January 27, 2011	José Santos Romero	MAS-IPSP	Designated as interim Mayor by Sucre's Council in Resolution 03/11, with three MAS votes (but not Berríos' alternate), four PAÍS votes, and that of Lourdes Millares.
July 27, 2011	January 31, 2012	Verónica Berríos	MAS-IPSP	Restored to office when the Guarantees Tribunal of Chuquisaca's Superior Court of Justice annulled Resolution 03/11
January 31, 2012	May 25, 2015	Moisés Torres Chivé	Renewing Freedom and Democracy (LIDER)	Elected in 2011 special election
May 25, 2015	November 13, 2019	Iván Arciénega	MAS-IPSP	Elected in 2015 municipal election. Resigned in 2019 national political crisis.
November 14, 2019	May 3, 2021	Rosario López	FRI	Designated as interim Mayor by Sucre's Council.
May 3, 2021	May 4, 2026	Enrique Leaño	MAS-IPSP	Elected in 2021 municipal election
May 4, 2026	Incumbent	Fátima Elva Tardío Quiroga	Alianza Gente Nueva	Elected in 2026 municipal election

The Municipal Council is the legislative branch of the government of the municipality of Sucre, the constitutional capital of Bolivia. The council consists of eleven elected members, and it elects its own President, Vice President and Secretary. The members of the municipal council elected on May 3, 2021 are:

- Oscar Sandy (MAS)
- Yolanda Barrios (MAS)
- Rodolfo Avilés (MAS)
- Guadalupe Fernández (MAS)
- Eduardo Lora (R-2025)
- Melisa Cortés (R-2025)
- Antonio Pino (R-2025)
- Carmen Rosa Torres (R-2025)
- Jenny Montaño (C-A)
- Gonzalo Pallares (CST)
- Edwin González (Unidos)

== Geography and territorial organization ==
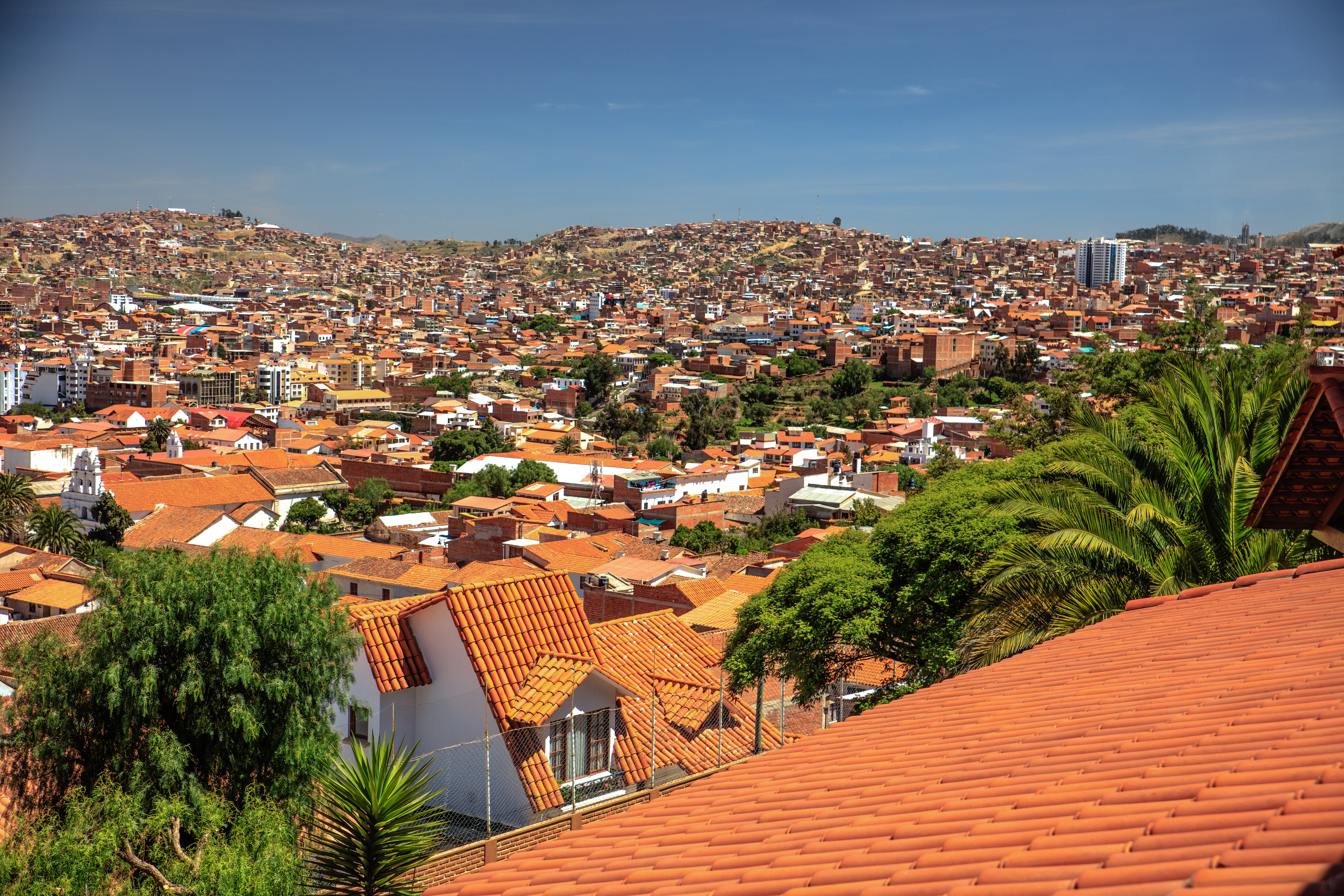
Sucre, Bolivia

Geographically, Sucre is located at the head of valleys with a warm and dry climate, at an altitude of 2,798 meters above sea level. Specifically, it lies in the geographic region of Bolivia's inter-Andean valleys, between the highlands of the Andean plateau and the lowlands of the Gran Chaco plains. Likewise, the area marks the boundary between the Amazon basin (the Chico and Grande rivers) and the La Plata River basin (the Cachimayu and Pilcomayu rivers).

The city is situated in Oropeza Province of the Department of Chuquisaca, at the foot of the Sica Sica and Churuquella hills (two ancient extinct volcanoes), in the Eastern Cordillera of the Andes, near the point where the mountain ranges decrease in elevation and provide a warm and dry head-of-valley climate.

Sucre is divided into eight numbered districts: the first five of these are urban districts, while Districts 6, 7, and 8 are rural districts. Each is administered by a Sub-Mayor (Spanish: Subalcalde), appointed by the Mayor of Sucre. The rural districts include multiple rural communities outside the urban area.

Sucre is served by Alcantari Airport, situated 30 km (19 mi) to the South.

=== Climate ===
Sucre features a subtropical highland climate (Köppen: Cwb, Trewartha: Cwll), with mild temperatures year round. Rain generally falls in summer thunderstorms.

The highest record temperature was 34.7 °C (94.5 °F) while the lowest record temperature was −6 °C (21 °F)

Climate data for Sucre, elevation 2,890 m (9,480 ft)
Month	Jan	Feb	Mar	Apr	May	Jun	Jul	Aug	Sep	Oct	Nov	Dec	Year
Record high °C (°F)	34.0 (93.2)	33.5 (92.3)	33.0 (91.4)	32.6 (90.7)	32.1 (89.8)	32.0 (89.6)	29.7 (85.5)	28.0 (82.4)	31.0 (87.8)	28.2 (82.8)	34.9 (94.8)	34.2 (93.6)	34.9 (94.8)
Mean daily maximum °C (°F)	21.6 (70.9)	21.1 (70.0)	21.5 (70.7)	21.5 (70.7)	21.7 (71.1)	21.0 (69.8)	20.7 (69.3)	21.8 (71.2)	22.6 (72.7)	23.2 (73.8)	23.1 (73.6)	22.4 (72.3)	21.8 (71.3)
Daily mean °C (°F)	16.0 (60.8)	15.8 (60.4)	15.8 (60.4)	15.2 (59.4)	14.1 (57.4)	12.8 (55.0)	12.4 (54.3)	13.6 (56.5)	14.9 (58.8)	16.2 (61.2)	16.6 (61.9)	16.4 (61.5)	15.0 (59.0)
Mean daily minimum °C (°F)	10.6 (51.1)	10.4 (50.7)	10.1 (50.2)	8.8 (47.8)	6.4 (43.5)	4.5 (40.1)	4.1 (39.4)	5.4 (41.7)	7.3 (45.1)	9.1 (48.4)	10.0 (50.0)	10.5 (50.9)	10.6 (51.1)
Record low °C (°F)	4.4 (39.9)	5.0 (41.0)	3.3 (37.9)	1.7 (35.1)	−3.9 (25.0)	−2.8 (27.0)	−4.4 (24.1)	−2.2 (28.0)	−1.7 (28.9)	−3.3 (26.1)	−3.3 (26.1)	−1.1 (30.0)	−4.4 (24.1)
Average precipitation mm (inches)	148.0 (5.83)	119.7 (4.71)	87.4 (3.44)	27.7 (1.09)	5.2 (0.20)	1.5 (0.06)	3.3 (0.13)	8.3 (0.33)	26.5 (1.04)	45.7 (1.80)	66.4 (2.61)	106.4 (4.19)	646.1 (25.43)
Average precipitation days	16.4	13.9	11.5	5.1	1.3	0.5	0.8	2.0	4.8	7.1	9.6	13.3	86.3
Average relative humidity (%)	66.2	69.0	66.5	62.0	48.1	42.3	42.6	44.5	48.0	51.5	55.4	62.0	54.8
Source 1: Servicio Nacional de Meteorología e Hidrología de Bolivia
Source 2: Deutscher Wetterdienst (extremes)

== The City of Four Names ==
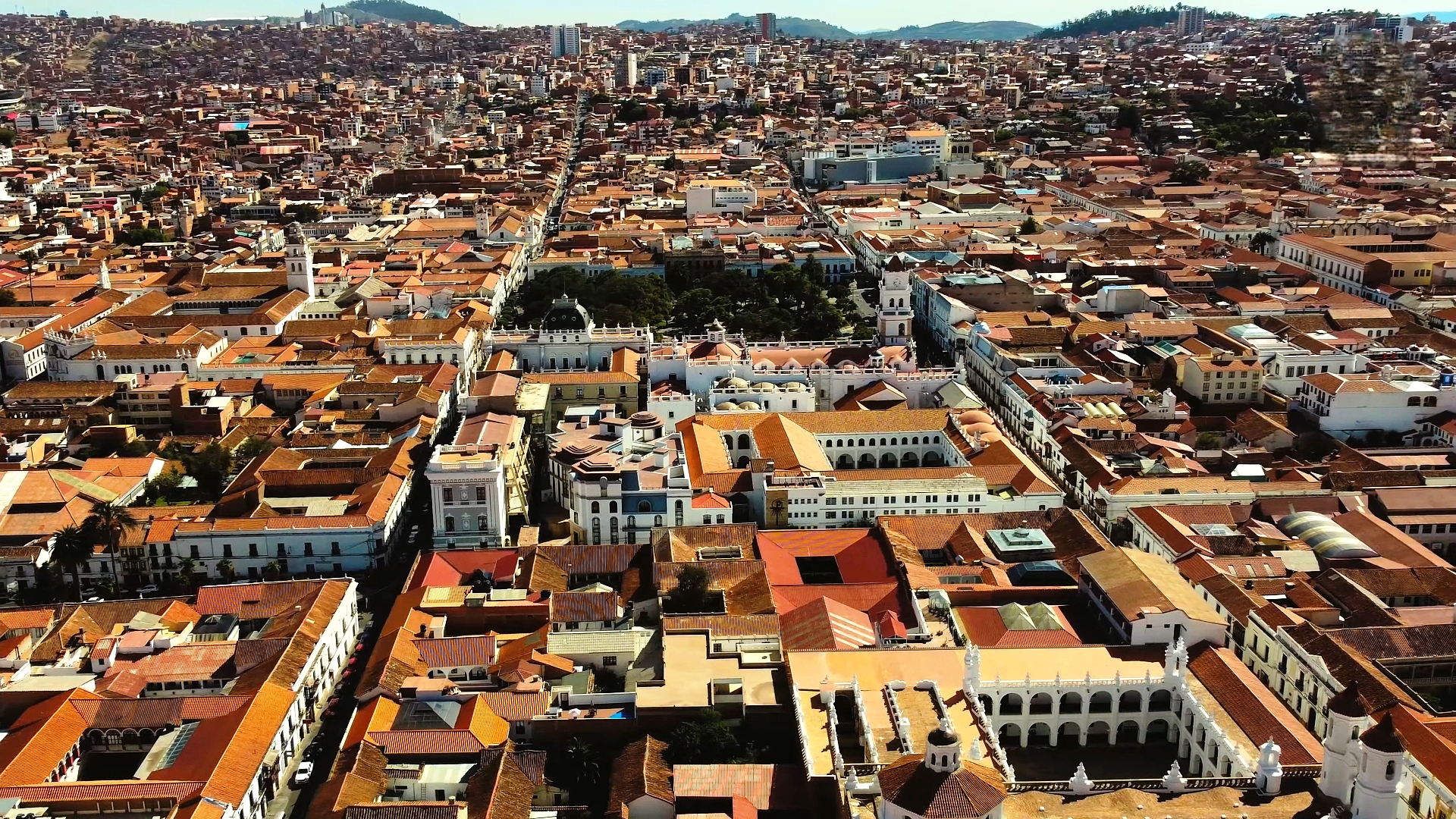
Sucre, the capital of Bolivia.

Each of the well known names represent a specific era of the city's history:

- Charcas was the indigenous name for the place upon which the Spaniards built the colonial city.
- La Plata was the name given to the emerging Hispanic city of privilege and honor.
- The name Chuquisaca was bestowed upon the city during the independence era.
- Sucre honors the great marshal of the Battle of Ayacucho (December 9, 1824), Antonio José de Sucre.
- "La Ciudad Blanca" is a nickname that was bestowed upon the city because many of the colonial style houses and structures are painted white.

== Culture ==
=== Dances ===
==== The cueca ====
This city was one of the main driving forces behind its spread, since some of the oldest and most beautiful pieces of this genre were composed by authors from Chuquisaca, such as Miguel Ángel Valda Paredes and Simeón Roncal. Two types of cueca stand out: one of a popular character and another known as the salon cueca, the latter with a slower rhythm, similar to the meter of the Argentine zamba.

==== The bailecito ====
This dance emerged in the bars and chicherías of the White City and was performed by student ensembles (estudiantinas). This rhythm became widespread and eventually became part of other regional identities, as in the case of Cochabamba, which today has adopted it as a characteristic rhythm of the region.

==== The thanta morenos ====
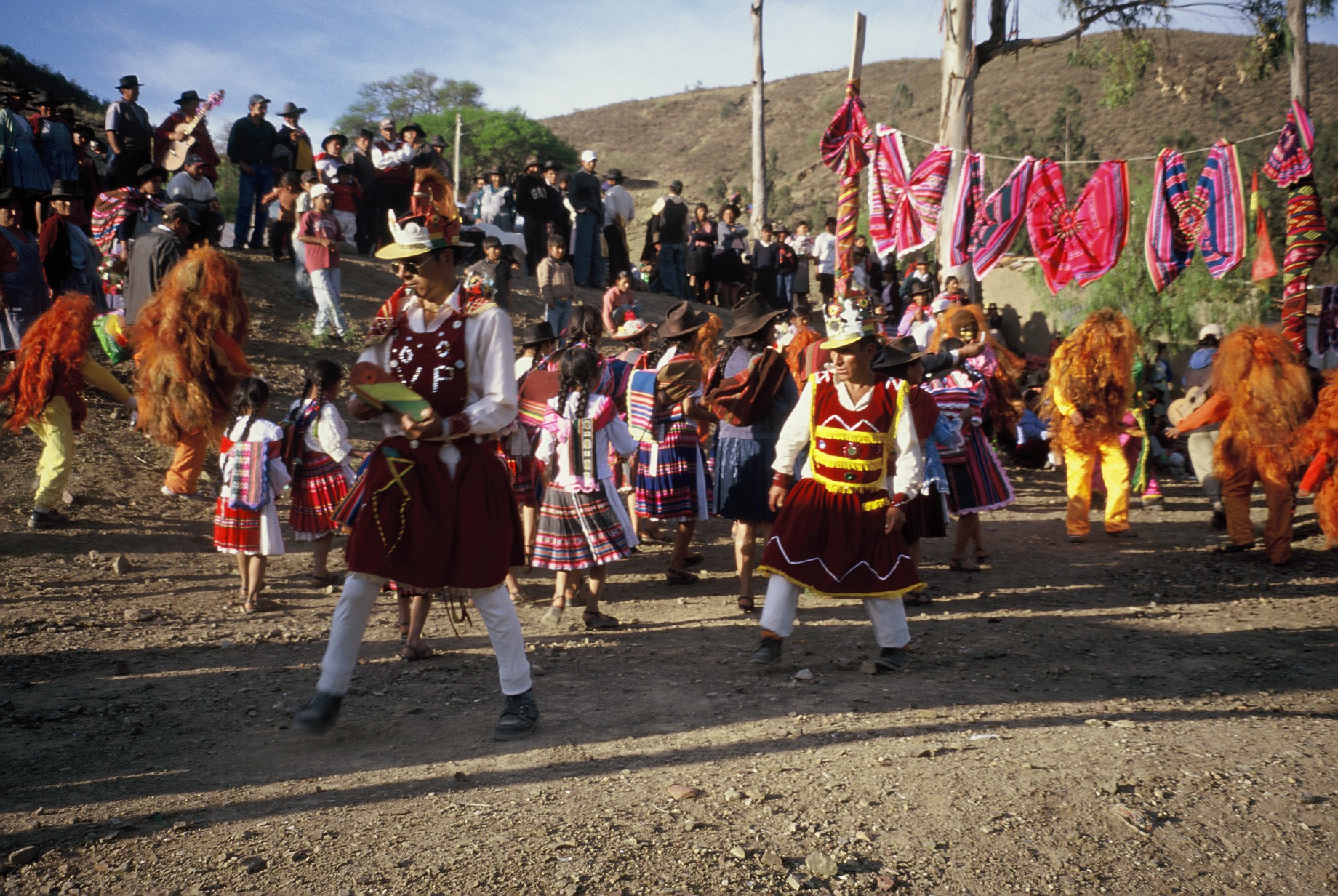
Morenada dance in Sucre

This is a distinctive dance, as it involves several characters, including: devils, imillas (young women), lions, awelos (old men), little monkeys, the rooster, the couples, and, as the musical component, the sicuris. The couples give the command signals with their rattles (matracas) when the sicuris begin to play, and they remain in the middle of all the characters, dancing with their rattles and lively, hopping steps. The other characters, led by the devils, dance around the couples in single-file lines and in two columns. The imillas stand behind the couples; they also form a separate group and dance with their own forward-moving steps.

When the music ends, all the characters (except the imillas and the couples) interact and play among themselves with improvised scripts inspired by the moment, creating a kind of theater whose purpose is to entertain the townspeople. Generally, the devils and the lions play on the same side against the other characters, except for the rooster, who usually annoys the women within reach, pretending to step on them.

This dance is seen during the patron saint festivals of the towns not only in the city of Sucre, but also in neighboring provinces such as Yamparáez, Tomina, and part of Belisario Boeto. To this day, there is no sociological or semiological study about its meaning and origin, and although there is a somewhat similar dance in the department of Potosí, the thanta morenos have unique characteristics in their development. Finally, in conclusion, this dance intertwines music, dance, and theater throughout its performance, making it unique in Bolivia.

=== Cuisine ===
Sucre has a wide variety of traditional dishes, many of which vary according to the season (such as mondongo for All Saints' Day and picana for Christmas, among others). Among the most popular and typical dishes are chorizos chuquisaqueños, c'kocko de pollo, picante de pollo, mondongo chuquisaqueño, cazuela de maní, and others. The typical drink is chicha criolla.

Sucre is also famous for its companies dedicated to the production of chocolates and bonbons, whose products are highly appreciated by tourists.

== Sports ==
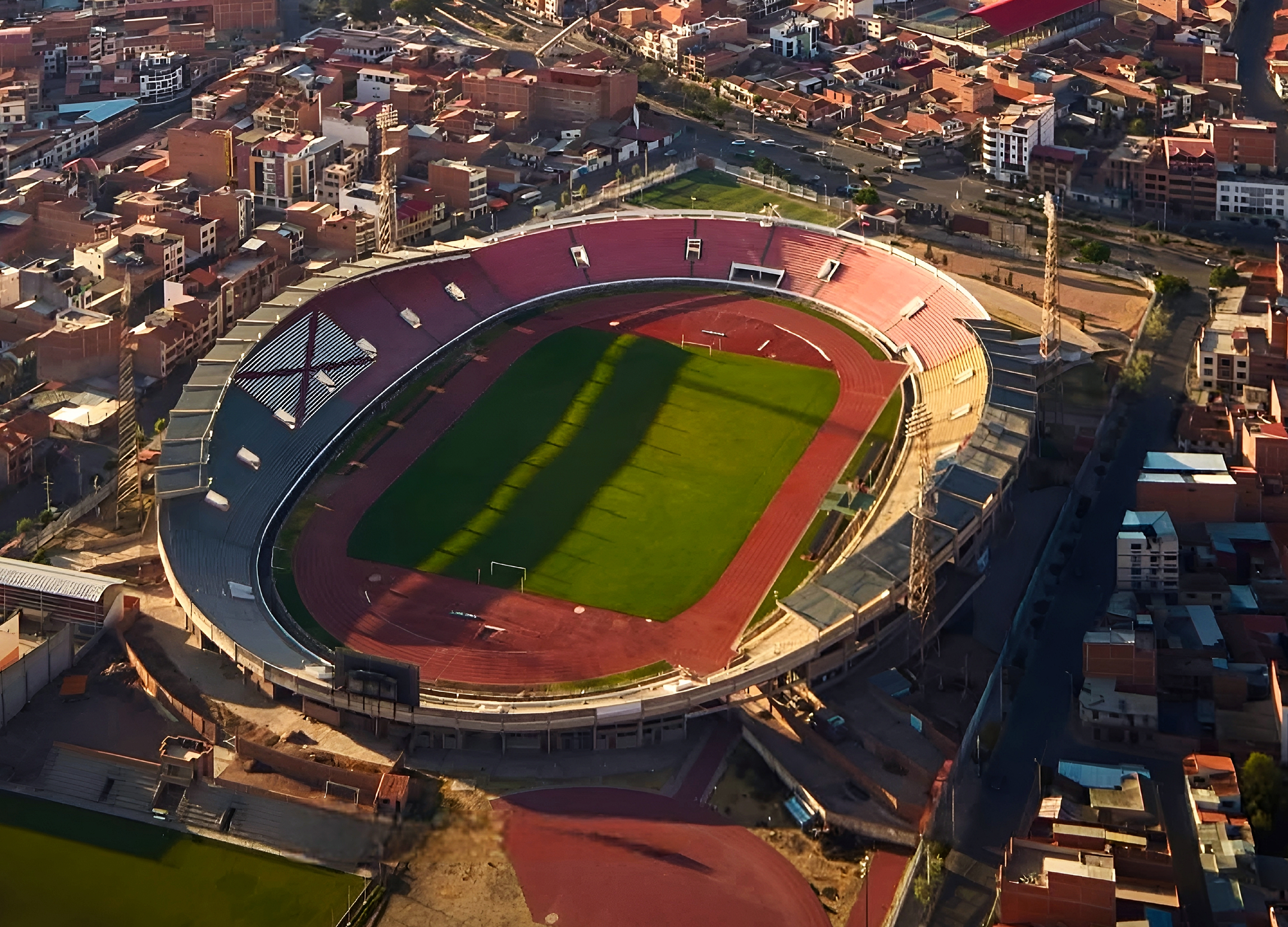
Patria Olympic Stadium

In Sucre, all kinds of sports are practiced, including football. The most representative team is Universitario de Sucre, currently in the second division of Bolivian football, where it has shown good performances; it has also represented Bolivia in the Copa Sudamericana and the Copa Libertadores, and in 2008 and 2014 it was national champion. At present, the team representing the city is Independiente Petrolero, which has a large fan base in the city and competes in the Bolivian Professional Football League after returning to professional football thanks to the runner-up position it achieved in the 2020 Copa Simón Bolívar.

Other football clubs in Sucre include Fancesa and Stormers Sporting Club, both of which have a certain footballing past and a recognized national trajectory. They currently play in the second division or regional competitions. Another club, Estudiantes, is based in the El Rollo area. The club is not affiliated with the Chuquisaca Football Association because of financial constraints.

Other sports are also practiced, such as tennis, swimming, racquetball, volleyball, martial arts (such as judo and karate), boxing, futsal, motorsports, and cycling, among others. Sucre is currently a high-performance center for all sports practiced nationally and internationally. It hosts the largest and most important sports complexes in the country, such as the Estadio Olímpico Patria, one of the largest stadiums in Bolivia; the Polideportivo Coliseum, the largest of its kind in Bolivia; and the Bolivarian Swimming Pool (La Piscina Bolivariana), the largest and highest-quality facility at the national level.

Sucre is also known as an important motorsports center, especially because it hosts one of the most important and oldest circuits in the country, the Óscar Crespo Circuit, and is considered a cradle of champions. In 2009 it hosted a round of the CODASUR Rally, and this year it will apply to host it again. Likewise, it was the host city of the 16th Bolivarian Games.

== Economy ==
The capital's economy is based primarily on:

- Chocolate production: Chocolates Para Ti, Chocolates Taboada
- Cement Manufacturing: FANCESA National Cement Factory, Sucre
- Manufacturing of Sheep Wool and Rabbit Fur Hat Shafts and Bells: "Chuquisaca Hat Factory"
- Beer Production: Sureña
- Natural Food Production: Productos Naturales Sobre La Roca
- Tourism: Sucre Municipal Autonomous Government
- Soft Drink Production: Salvietti S.A. "The taste of our own"
- Dairy Production: PIL Chuquisaca
- Sausage Production: Cobolde.
- The Mercado Campesino marketplace is the largest in Sucre.

Sucre Municipality: Poverty and Basic Service Access
Location	Poverty (NBI)			Lack of Water Access			Lack of Sanitation Access		
	2012	2024	Change	2001	2024	Change	2001	2024	Change
Sucre	27%	16%	▼ -11%	15%	6%	▼ -9%	30%	14%	▼ -15%
Chuquisaca	54%	38%	▼ -17%	41%	12%	▼ -29%	58%	32%	▼ -26%
Bolivia	45%	30%	▼ -15%	27%	13%	▼ -14%	59%	36%	▼ -22%
NBI indicates a Unsatisfied Basic Needs definition for poverty. Source: INE Bolivia, 2024 Bolivian Census

== Education ==
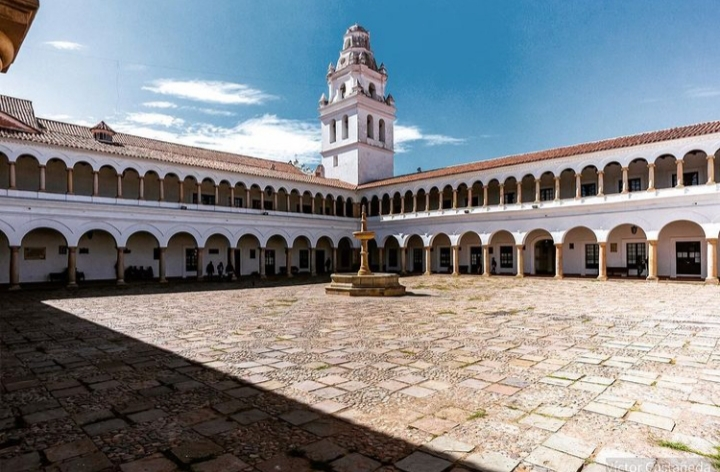
The historic courtyard of the Royal and Pontifical University of San Francisco Xavier de Chuquisaca

Sucre is home to the second oldest public university in the Americas, the Universidad Mayor Real y Pontificia de San Francisco Xavier de Chuquisaca; often abbreviated USFX. The university draws students both nationally and internationally, and different departments can be found scattered around the city. Degree areas at USFX include law, political science, medicine, odontology, chemistry, business administration, financial sciences, and more.

The city also features other academic institutions such as a campus of the private university Universidad Privada del Valle, also known as Univalle, the National Teachers School (Escuela Nacional de Maestros "Mariscal Sucre"), the Universidad Privada Domingo Savio, and the Universidad Andina Simón Bolívar.

== Architecture ==
The city of Sucre contains a number of old and classic buildings.

=== The House of Freedom ===
View of House of Freedom from the main square

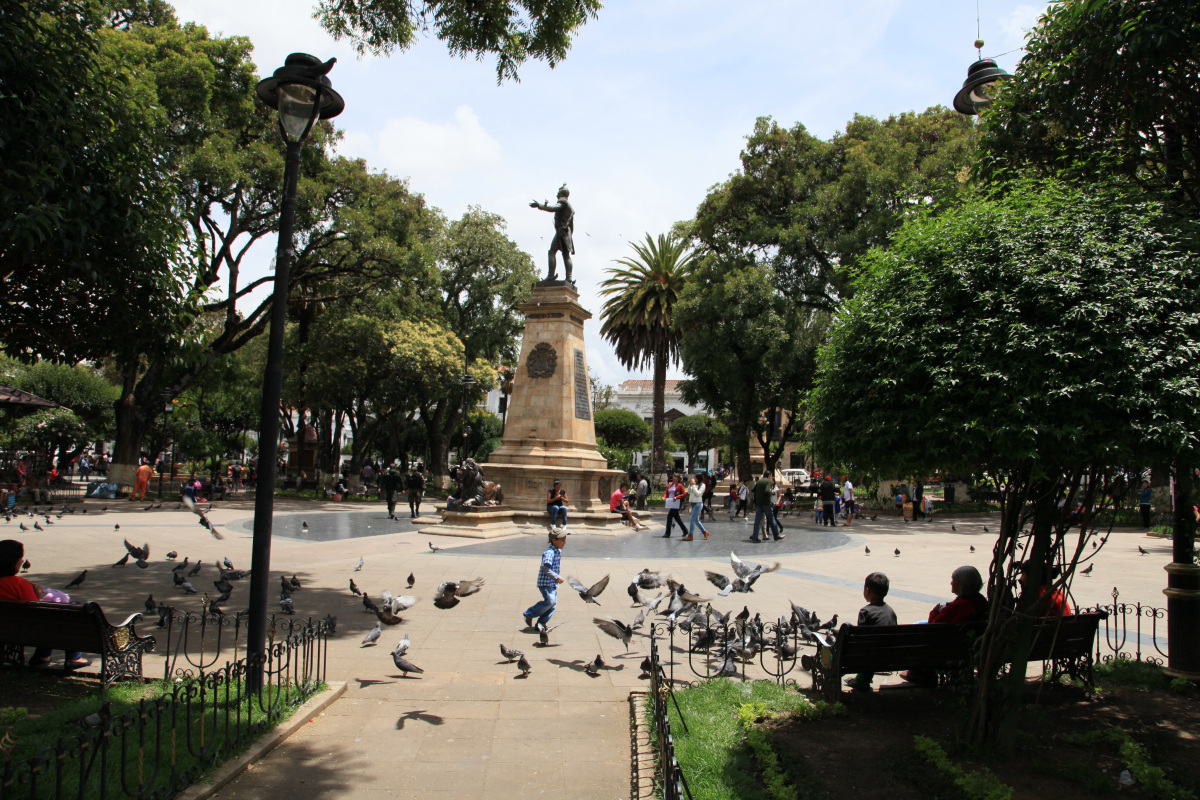
May 25th square

Built in 1621, it is perhaps the most important building of the nation. The republic was founded in this building by Simón Bolívar who wrote the Bolivian Constitution.
The "Salón de la Independencia" houses the Bolivian Declaration of Independence.

=== National Library ===
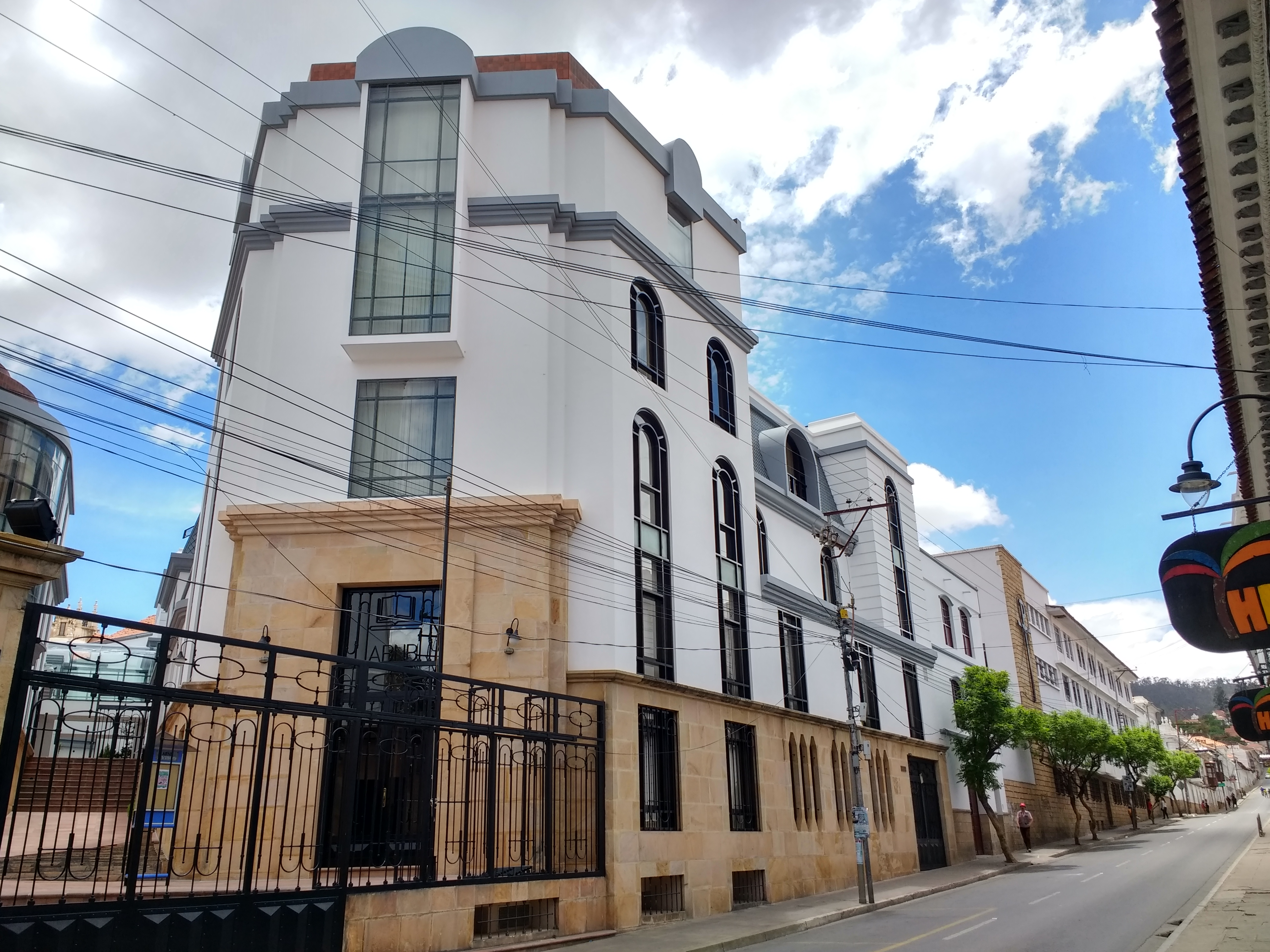
National Archives and Libraries

Built on the same year of the foundation of the Republic, it is the first and the most important historical, bibliographical and documentation center of the country. The National Library has documents that date from 16th century.

=== Metropolitan Cathedral ===
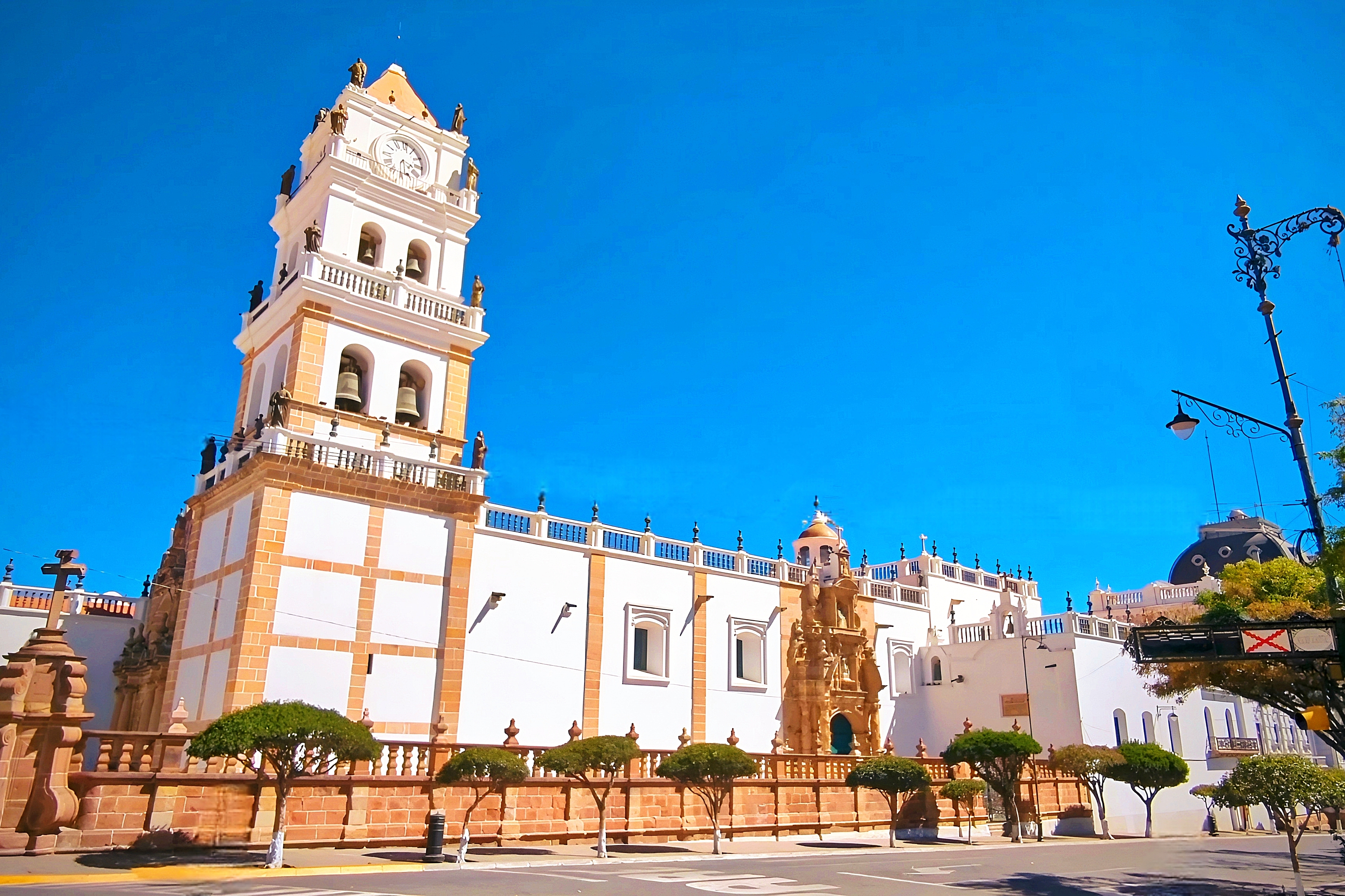
Metropolitan Cathedral of Sucre

Built between 1559 and 1712, the cathedral has the "Museo Catedraliceo" which is the first and most important religious museum of the country. The "Pinacoteca" has a vast collection of paintings by Colonial and Republican masters and also by Europeans such as Bitti, Fourchaudt and Van Dyck. The Cathedral contains a vast amount of jewelry made of gold, silver and gemstones.

=== Archbishop's Palace ===
Built in 1609, was an important religious and historic institution during colonial times.

=== Departmental Autonomous Government of Chuquisaca ===
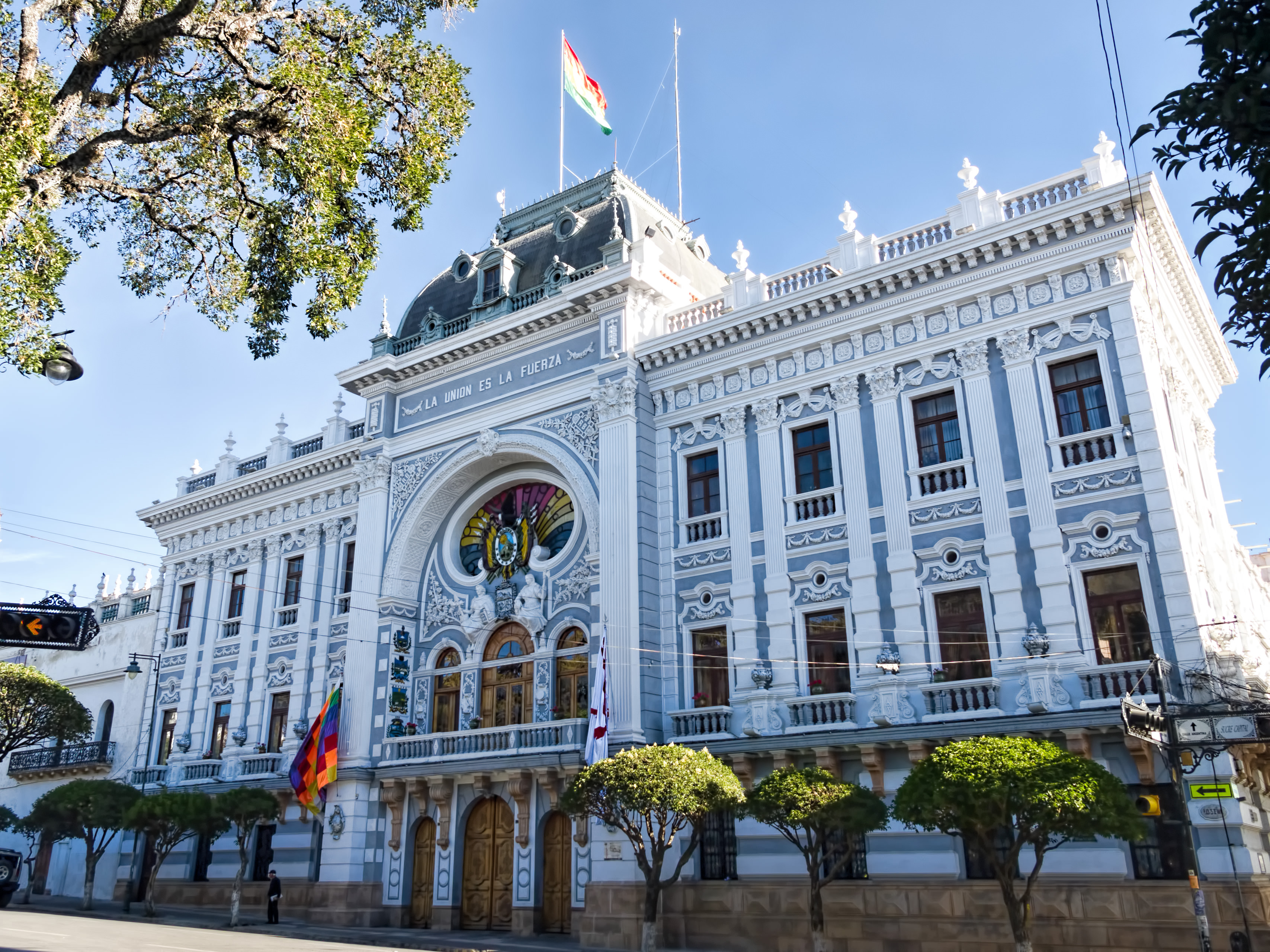
View of the Chuquisaca Governorship from the main square

One of the best buildings of republican architecture, this was completed in 1896. It was the first Palace of Government of Bolivia but when the government was moved to La Paz it became the Chuquisaca Governorship Palace.

=== Supreme Court of Justice ===
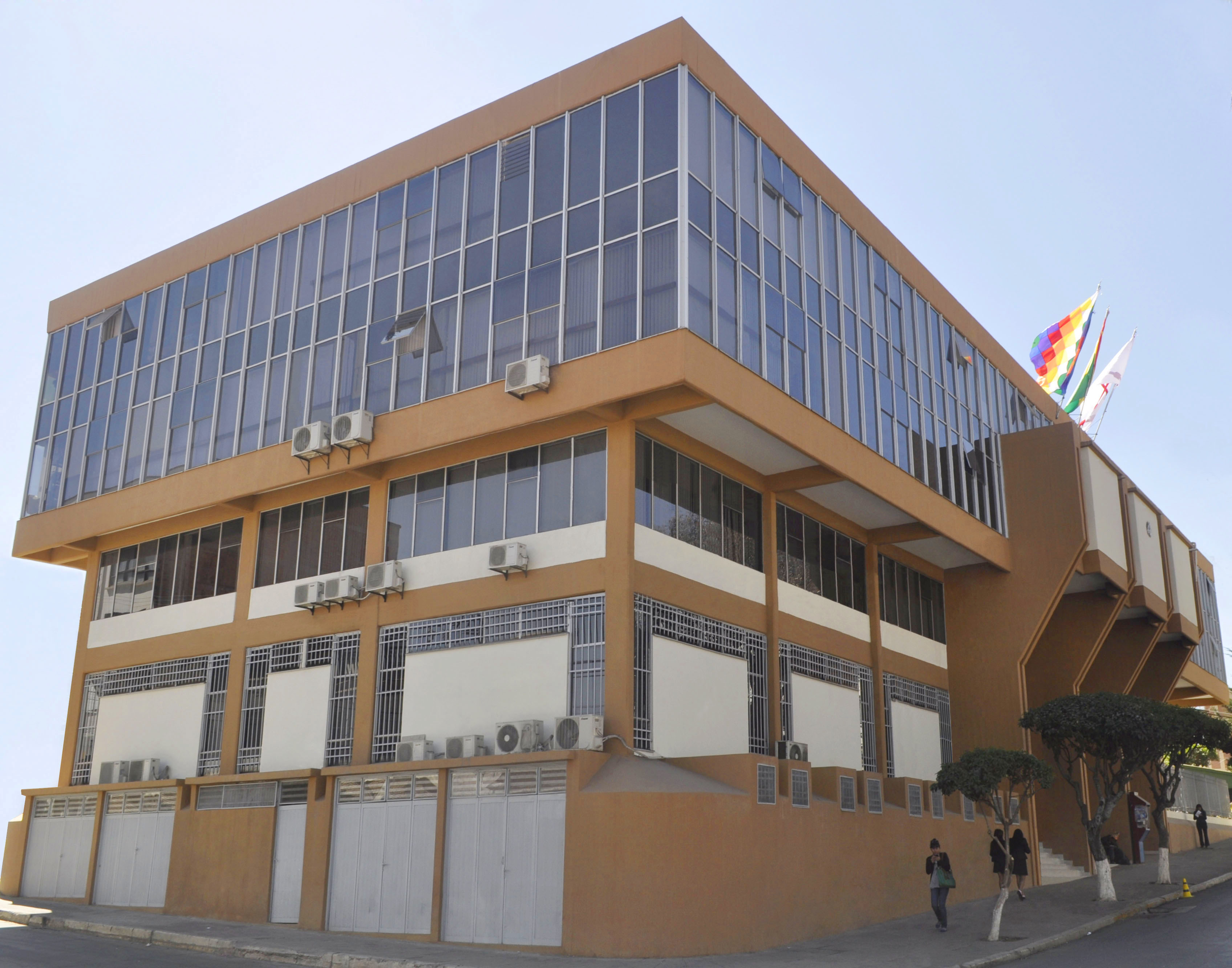
Plurinational Constitutional Court of Bolivia

On July 16, 1827, the Supreme Court of the Nation was established. Its first president was Dr. Manuel Maria Urcullo. Others prominent in its history include Dr. Pantaleon Dalence, who was twice president of the Supreme Court and through his qualities became known as the 'Father of Bolivian Justice'. This institution was installed in several places before moving to its current building. It was designed in the neoclassical style under the canons of French academicism and was inaugurated on May 25, 1945.

=== General Cemetery ===
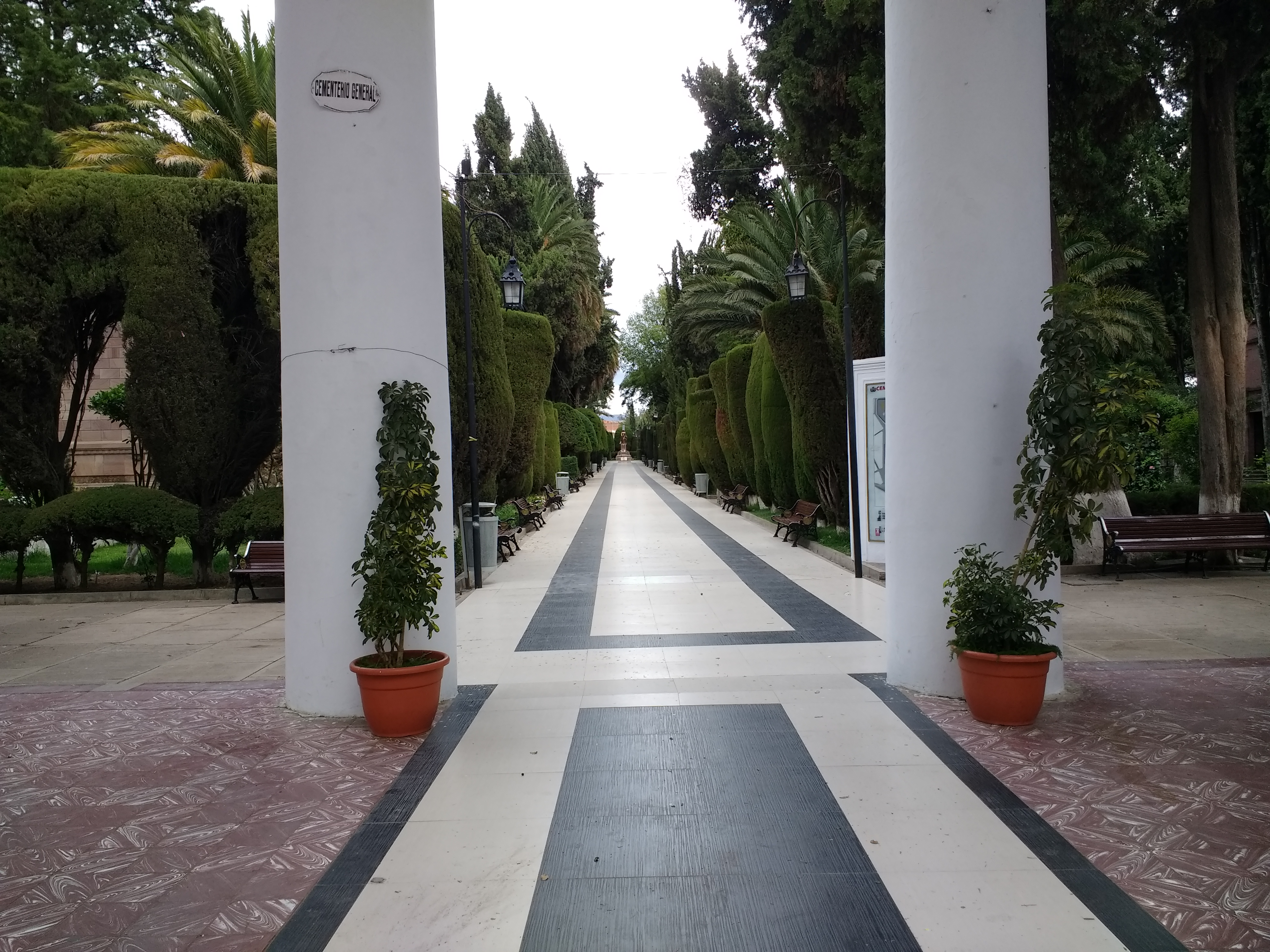
Sucre General Cemetery

Some of the areas date from the late nineteenth century. Ornate mausoleums, tombs and gardens with magnificent old trees populate the space that is home to the graves of important people in the arts, sciences and the history both of Bolivia and of Latin America.

=== Churches and Convents ===
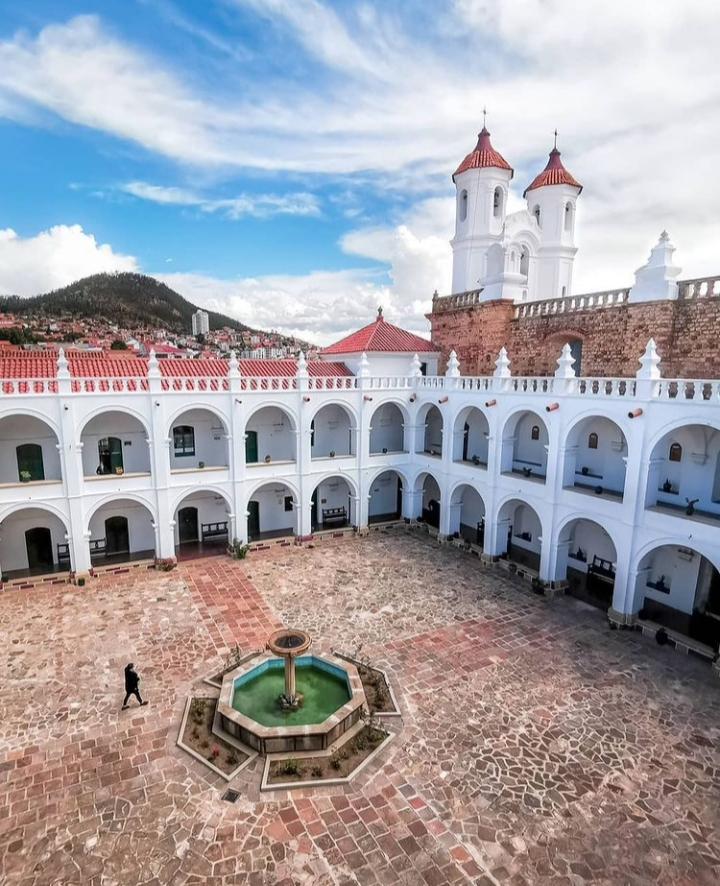
Convent of San Felipe de Neri, Sucre.

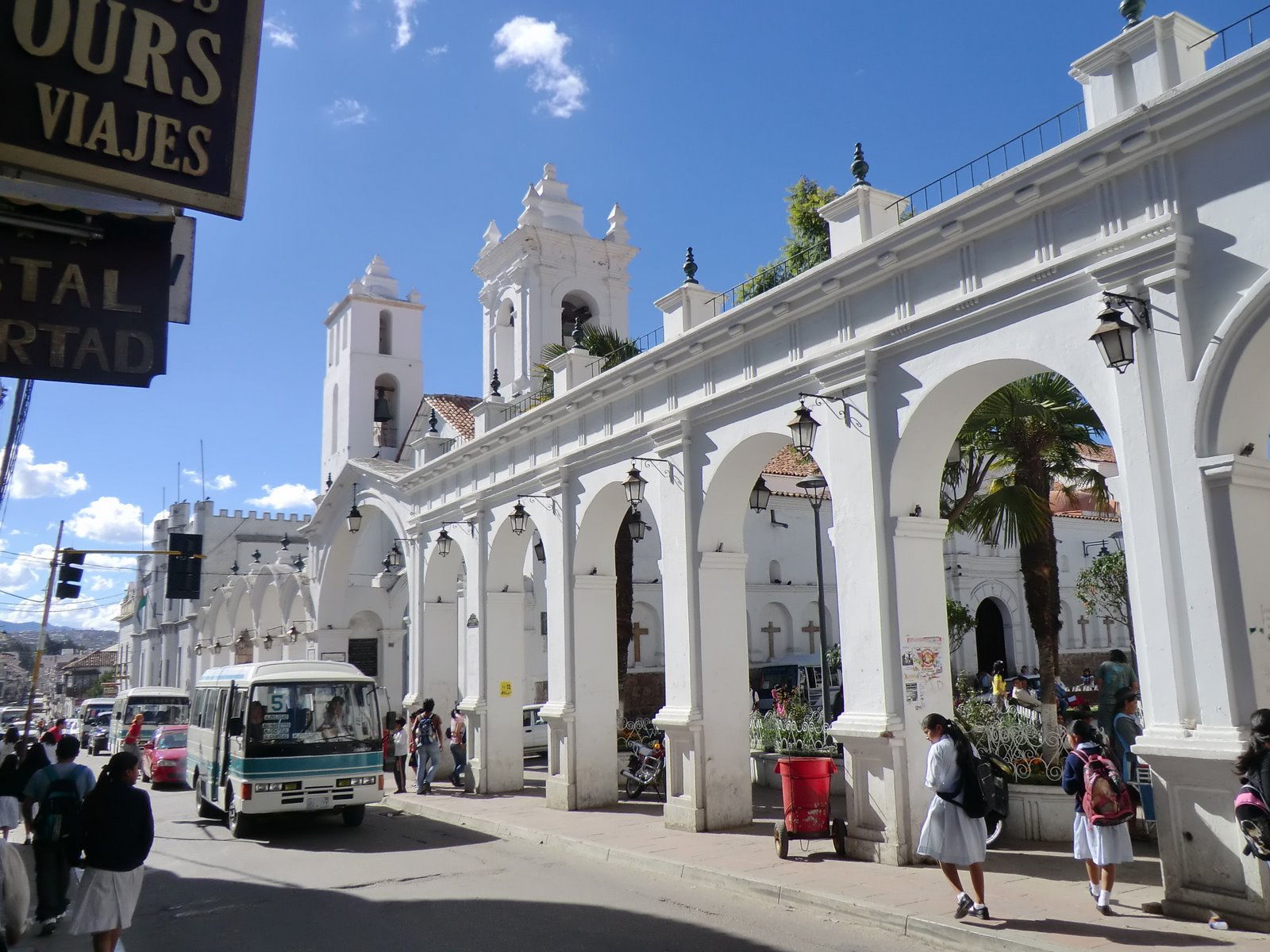
Church of St. Francis of Assisi

- San Felipe Nery
- San Francisco
- La Recoleta
- Santa Teresa
- Santa Clara
- Santo Domingo
- San Lazaro (The oldest church in the country and ex-Cathedral of Sucre)
- San Sebastian
- Iglesia de la Merced
- San Agustín
- Santa Mónica
- Santa Barbara
- San Miguel

=== Chapels ===
- Loreto's Chapel
- Virgen de Guadalupe

== Transportation ==
About 30 km southeast of the city lies Alcantarí International Airport, with regular services to the cities of Santa Cruz de la Sierra, La Paz, Cochabamba, and other connections. This is the city’s third airport, built after the Lajastambo airports (an old airfield constructed during the Chaco War in the late 1930s, now demolished and urbanized) and the former Juana Azurduy de Padilla Airport.

The bus terminal was inaugurated in 1975 and is located on Ostria Gutiérrez Avenue, offering regular national and departmental services.

By land, the city is connected to Potosí via Route 5 to the southwest, which then continues to Uyuni, while the same route heading north leads to the cities of Cochabamba and Santa Cruz.

== Twin towns – sister cities ==
- La Plata, Argentina
- San Miguel de Tucumán, Argentina
- Ushuaia, Argentina
- Concepción, Chile

== See also ==
- Antonio José de Sucre
- Charca people
- La Paz
