= Jaime Barrón =

Bolivian politician (born 1959)

Jaime Barrón Poveda (born 1959 in Sucre) is former mayor of the city of Sucre, Bolivia, representing the Pact of Social Integration (PAÍS) political party, which is closely aligned with the Inter-Institutional Committee of Chuquisaca. Following his election in the April 4, 2010 regional elections, Barrón was sworn in as mayor in late May. However, Barrón was also indicted for instigating the violence of May 24, 2008. His office as mayor was suspended due to the indictment and Veronica Berrios, of the Movimiento Al Socialismo party was chosen by the council as interim mayor in mid-June 2010. On June 19, Barrón formally resigned his position as mayor to make way for new elections, which can be held no earlier than January 2011. On November 15, by judge's order, Barrón was placed into detention to await trial.

Barrón's career has been in the University of San Francisco Xavier since 1979, where he served as docent, department director, deacon, vice rector, and finally rector. During 1981 and 1982, he was involved in activism against the country's military dictatorship. In recent years, he served as president of the Inter-Institutional Committee of the Interests of Chuquisaca. He is married to Martha Chavarría and has three children.

| Preceded by Hugo Loayza | Mayor of Sucre; May - June 2011 | Succeeded by Verónica Berrios |
