= Irma Ledezma =

Bolivian politician (born 1959)

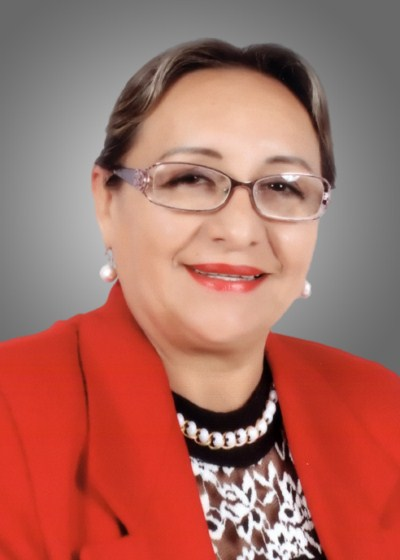
- Official portrait, 2017

Member of the Chamber of Deputies from Beni circumscription 61
- In office 18 January 2015 – 3 November 2020
- Substitute: Luis Fernando Cuéllar
- Preceded by: Juan Carlos Ojopi (Note: Redistribution; circumscription 65.)
- Succeeded by: Leonardo Ayala
- Constituency: Iténez; Mamoré; Vaca Díez; Yacuma

Personal details
- Born: Irma Herminia Ledezma Tambo; 10 October 1959 (age 66) Guayaramerín, Beni, Bolivia
- Party: Social Democratic Movement (until 2020)
- Occupation: Businesswoman; politician; rancher

Irma Herminia Ledezma Tambo (born 10 October 1959) is a Bolivian businesswoman, politician, and rancher who served as a member of the Chamber of Deputies from Beni, representing circumscription 61 from 2015 to 2020. Ledezma spent most of her professional career in the business of commerce and cattle ranching, two sectors vital to Beni's regional economy. She entered politics as a member of the Social Democratic Movement, representing the party in the Chamber of Deputies and serving as head of its Guayaramerín branch until 2020 before retiring upon the completion of her parliamentary term.

== Early life and career ==
Irma Ledezma was born on 10 October 1959 in Guayaramerín, Beni. She dedicated much of her professional career to the fields of commerce and cattle ranching, two industries that rapidly expanded in the lowland Amazonian departments in the final decades of the twentieth century, driven, among other factors, by an influx of migration to Cobija, Guayaramerín, and Riberalta, as well as cross-border trade with Brazil. In Beni, in particular, the peripheral presence of the national government promoted the formation of a strong regional economic elite based in the agriculture, ranching, and lumber industries, who often took on public functions in the State's absence, such as the construction of local infrastructure. These works gained them a high degree of social standing, which often translated into political influence.

== Chamber of Deputies ==
=== Election ===
Such was the case with Ledezma, who made her entry into politics as a member of the nascent Social Democratic Movement (MDS), composing part of the party's regional directorate. When the MDS contested its first general election in 2014, Ledezma was nominated to seek a seat in the Chamber of Deputies. She won by a comfortable majority in Beni's circumscription 61, the largest in the department, encompassing the provinces of Iténez, Mamoré, Yacuma, and portions of Vaca Díez.

=== Tenure ===
In parliament, Ledezma spent the entirety of her tenure on the Chamber of Deputies' Education Committee.^{[§]} Upon the conclusion of her term in 2020, Ledezma retired from politics, resigning as head of the MDS's Guayaramerín branch. Hers was among a series of departures by top party officials suffered by the MDS around this time. The party had sought to establish itself as a national political force but was debilitated by its electoral failures in 2019 and 2020 and was ultimately relegated to a minor front following the 2021 municipal elections.

=== Commission assignments ===
- Education and Health Commission
  - Education Committee (2015–2020)

== Electoral history ==
Electoral history of Irma Ledezma
Year	Office	Party	Alliance	Votes			Result	Ref.
Year	Office	Party	Alliance	Total	%	P.	Result	Ref.
2014	Deputy	Social Democratic Movement	Democratic Unity	17,538	54.33%	1st	Won	
Source: Plurinational Electoral Organ | Electoral Atlas

Chamber of Deputies of Bolivia
Preceded by Juan Carlos Ojopi	Member of the Chamber of Deputies from Beni circumscription 61; 2015–2020	Succeeded by Leonardo Ayala
