= San Ramón, Beni =

- Location within Bolivia
- Coordinates: 13°16′02″S 64°37′02″W
- Country: Bolivia
- Department: Beni Department
- Province: Mamoré Province
- Municipality: San Ramón Municipality
- Canton: San Ramón Canton
- Elevation: 456 ft (139 m)

Population (2009)est.
  - Total: 5,385
- Time zone: UTC-4 (BOT)

San Ramón is a small town in the Beni Department in Bolivia.

== Location ==
San Ramón is the seat of the San Ramón Municipality and is situated in the San Ramón Canton in Mamoré Province. The town is located at an elevation of 139 m on the right banks of Río Machupo, a headwater of Iténez River. San Ramón is bordered to the east by "Laguna Grande" (Great Lake), which has a length of 2,600 m and a width of 1,600 m.

== Geography ==
San Ramón is situated in the Bolivian Lowlands in the Moxos Plains, at more than 100,000 square kilometers one of the largest wetlands worldwide. The ecosystem of the San Ramón region is that of the tropical savanna. The yearly precipitation in this region is circa 1,600 mm, with a distinct dry season from May to September. The monthly temperature averages over the year are between 24 °C and 29 °C.

== Transport network ==
San Ramón is located 211 km north of Trinidad, the Department's capital.
San Ramón is passed by the Bolivian interstate Ruta 9, which crosses the complete Bolivian lowlands and connects Guayaramerin in the north on the Brazilian border with Yacuiba in the south on the Argentine border. Starting at Guayaramerin it passes Paraíso, Puerto Siles and San Joaquín before it reaches San Ramón and continues along San Pedro and San Javier to the capital Trinidad. From San Ramón a secondary road leads to the east and passes Magdalena and Bella Vista at Río Iténez before it reaches the Brazilian border.

On the eastern edge of San Ramón there is San Ramón Airport with a 1,930 m dirt strip, which is registered as SLRA in the ICAO airport code.

== Population ==
Over the past two decades, the population figure has risen by 60 percent.
It amounted to 3,427 inhabitants at the 1992 census, 4,431 inhabitants at the 2001 census, and is estimated by 5,385 inhabitants at 2009.

Climate data for San Ramón, elevation 139 m (456 ft), (1981–2015)
Month	Jan	Feb	Mar	Apr	May	Jun	Jul	Aug	Sep	Oct	Nov	Dec	Year
Record high °C (°F)	36.5 (97.7)	36.0 (96.8)	36.4 (97.5)	37.4 (99.3)	36.8 (98.2)	37.4 (99.3)	39.7 (103.5)	39.2 (102.6)	40.0 (104.0)	39.6 (103.3)	38.2 (100.8)	36.9 (98.4)	40.0 (104.0)
Mean daily maximum °C (°F)	31.6 (88.9)	31.4 (88.5)	31.6 (88.9)	31.7 (89.1)	30.7 (87.3)	30.8 (87.4)	31.7 (89.1)	33.3 (91.9)	33.8 (92.8)	33.8 (92.8)	32.5 (90.5)	31.9 (89.4)	32.1 (89.7)
Daily mean °C (°F)	27.1 (80.8)	27.0 (80.6)	27.2 (81.0)	26.9 (80.4)	25.5 (77.9)	24.6 (76.3)	24.4 (75.9)	25.6 (78.1)	27.0 (80.6)	27.8 (82.0)	27.4 (81.3)	27.2 (81.0)	26.5 (79.7)
Mean daily minimum °C (°F)	22.7 (72.9)	22.5 (72.5)	22.7 (72.9)	22.1 (71.8)	20.3 (68.5)	18.4 (65.1)	17.2 (63.0)	17.9 (64.2)	20.1 (68.2)	21.8 (71.2)	22.2 (72.0)	22.5 (72.5)	20.9 (69.6)
Record low °C (°F)	17.4 (63.3)	17.0 (62.6)	14.5 (58.1)	11.6 (52.9)	8.8 (47.8)	2.0 (35.6)	4.2 (39.6)	7.0 (44.6)	10.2 (50.4)	11.8 (53.2)	12.0 (53.6)	15.6 (60.1)	2.0 (35.6)
Average precipitation mm (inches)	242.2 (9.54)	228.2 (8.98)	205.9 (8.11)	103.6 (4.08)	53.8 (2.12)	22.4 (0.88)	22.4 (0.88)	28.3 (1.11)	57.8 (2.28)	121.8 (4.80)	181.2 (7.13)	229.1 (9.02)	1,496.7 (58.93)
Average precipitation days	15.3	14.1	13.1	7.8	4.6	1.8	2.1	1.9	3.9	8.2	11.2	13.7	97.7
Average relative humidity (%)	80.2	80.5	80.0	77.4	75.4	72.0	64.6	60.6	62.7	68.7	75.2	78.4	73.0
Source: Servicio Nacional de Meteorología e Hidrología de Bolivia
