= San Ramón Municipality, Beni =

Coordinates: 16°31′S 62°22′W

San Ramón Municipality (Mamoré)
- Municipality
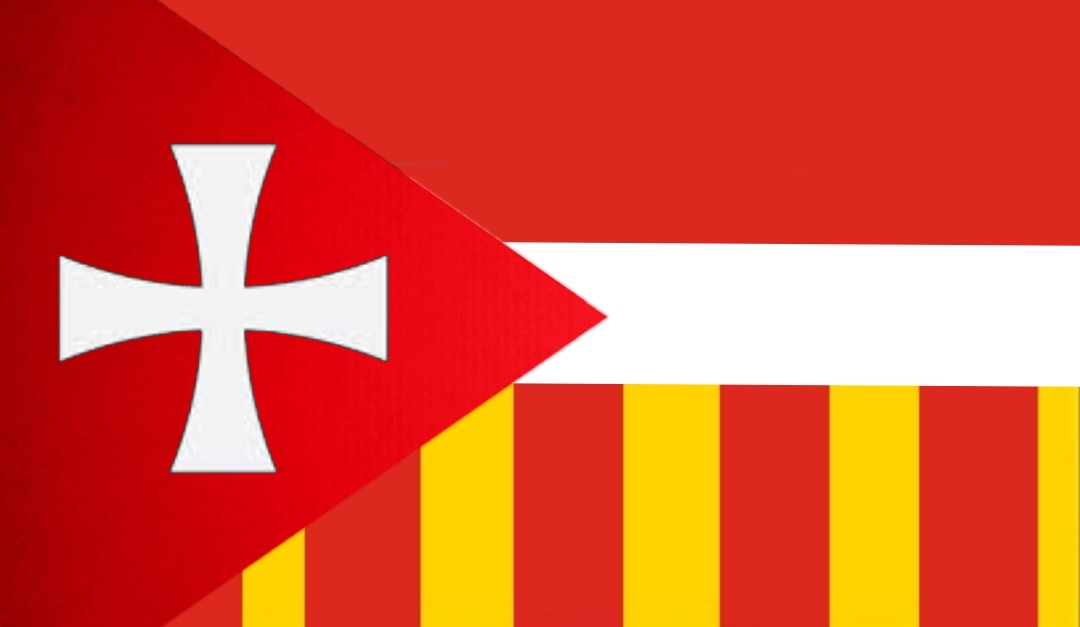
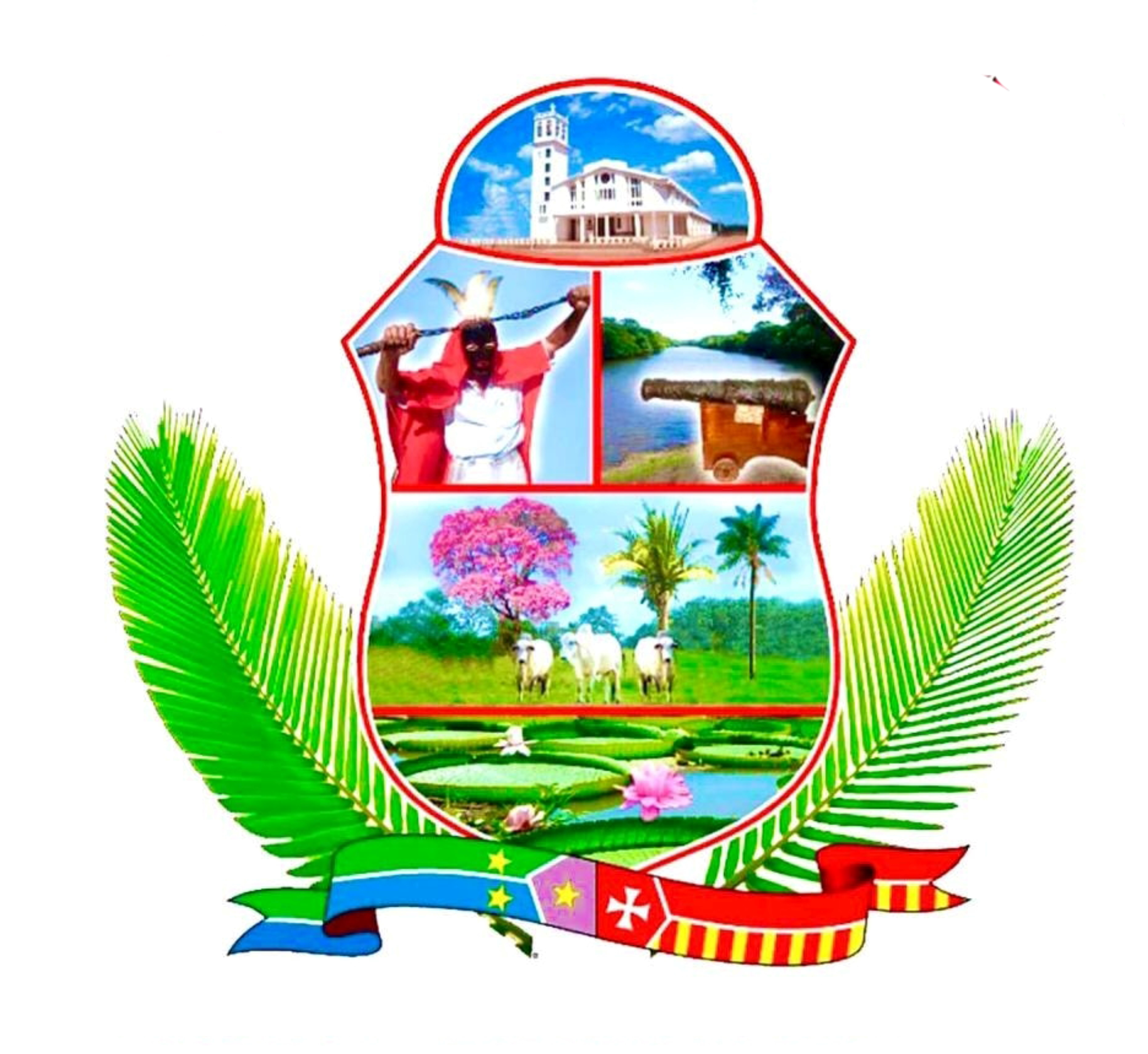
- Flag Coat of arms
- Interactive map of San Ramón Municipality (Mamoré)
- Country: Bolivia
- Department: Beni Department
- Province: Mamoré Province
- Seat: San Ramón
- Time zone: UTC-4 (BOT)

San Ramón Municipality is a municipality of the Beni Department, Bolivia.
