= Damián Condori =

4th Governor of Chuquisaca Department

4th Governor of Chuquisaca
- Incumbent
- Assumed office 3 May 2021
- Preceded by: Efraín Balderas (interim)

Personal details
- Born: Damián Condori Herrera; 26 September 1979 (age 46) Presto, Chuquisaca, Bolivia
- Party: We Are All Chuquisaca (2014–present)
- Other political affiliations: Movement for Socialism (before 2014); We Are All Bolivia (2016–present)

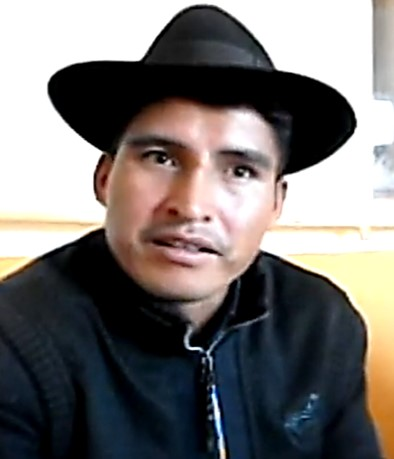

Damián Condori Herrera (born 26 September 1979) is a Bolivian peasant leader, politician, and Governor of Chuquisaca Department since 3 May 2021. Condori served as executive secretary of the Unified Syndical Confederation of Rural Workers of Bolivia (CSUTCB), Bolivia's largest peasant union. Condori first ran for governor of Chuquisaca in 2015, finishing second and failing to qualify for a runoff under a controversial electoral court ruling. He is the co-founder of We Are All Bolivia (Bolivia Somos Todos), a party founded on 21 April 2016, by dissident former members of the Movement for Socialism–Political Instrument for the Sovereignty of the Peoples (MAS-IPSP). He was spent two years in pre-trial detention as part of the investigation into the Indigenous Fund corruption scandal from 2015 to 2017. In the 2021 election for governor, Condori won a plurality in the first round and defeated MAS-IPSP candidate Juan Carlos León in the runoff.

== Political career ==
=== Gubernatorial candidacy, 2015 ===
In 2014, the Chuquisaca regional affiliate of the CSUTCB, the Unified Syndical Workers' Federation of Native People of Chuquisaca (Federación Única Trabajadores de Pueblos Originarios de Chuquisaca; FUTPOCH), proposed to the governing Movement for Socialism (MAS-IPSP) party that Condori should be its candidate for governor. CSUTCB had been a founding affiliate of the MAS-IPSP, which solicited input from social movements regarding its candidates, but left the final decision to President Evo Morales. When the party opted instead to renominate sitting governor Esteban Urquizu, the FUTPOCH leadership refused to support Urquizu and instead back the Condori's candidacy on the party line of We Are All Chuquisaca. In February 2015, the National Executive Committee of the CSUTCB expelled Condori for pursuing the independent candidacy.

In the March 2015 election, Condori received 101,257 votes, 42.49% of the total, placing second after MAS-IPSP candidate Urquizu who won 116,536, or 48,91%. Days before the vote, the candidate for the Revolutionary Left Front (Frente Revolucionario de Izquierda), Adrián Valeriano, gave up his candidacy and announced his support for the MAS-IPSP. After the election, on 13 April, the Departmental Electoral Tribunal nullified votes for Valeriano and ruled that Urquizu had won more than 50% of the total votes legitimately cast. This decision prevented a run-off election between Condori and Urquizu, as is usually required when neither candidate has a majority or a lead of more than 10% of the total votes cast. In October, the Supreme Electoral Tribunal suspended the five members of the Departmental Electoral Tribunal who made this decision and opened an investigation of "grave faults" in their conduct of the matter.

=== Charges and detention related to the Indigenous Fund ===
Beginning in 2014, a large-scale corruption and mismanagement scandal emerged over dealings with the Development Fund for Indigenous and Native Peoples and Campesino Communities (Fondo de Desarrollo para los Pueblos Indígenas Originarios y Comunidades Campesinas; FDOOIOYCC), commonly known as the Indigenous Fund. The Indigenous Fund allocated a portion of the Direct Tax on Hydrocarbons to indigenous community use, and was supervised by leaders of the five major indigenous organizations of Bolivia, including the CSUTCB. These organizations and their affiliates were also the main recipients of the fund. In 2014, Condori served on the directing board of the Fund, and also as an official representative of some approved projects. An investigation by the Comptroller General of Bolivia reported in February 2015 that over Bs/71 million had been spent on 153 unexecuted projects, with more expected to be found.

In August 2015, the Prosecutor's Office called on Condori to testify about the Indigenous Fund, and began contemplating an order for his detention after he did not appear. Condori's lawyer then alleged that the threat of detention was related to his political separation from the MAS-IPSP. On 27 November, Condori was arrested in Sucre, within twenty-four hours of the arrest of former Minister of Rural Development Julia Ramos, and former CSUTCB official Jorge Choque Salomé, a MAS-IPSP senator. On 2 December, a judge approved pre-trial detention without bail for Condori on the charges of nonfulfillment of contracts and illicit enrichment at the expense of the State. In January 2016, Condori returned some Bs/600,000 transferred to him as part of an Indigenous Fund project; his lawyer claimed that his removal from the leadership of the CSUTCB had prevented him from completing paperwork on a prior project and returning the funds earlier. Joel Guarachi, former General Secretary of the CSUTCB and an affiliate of BST, argued at that time that Condori is a political prisoner, being held for the political advantage of the government. As of July 2017, Condori had spent 601 days in prison and Bolivia Somos Todos officials reported that he lacked adequate funds to pay his lawyer. On 18 December 2017, Condori was released from prison and placed under house arrest in Sucre. As of July 2019, the investigation into irregularities at the Indigenous Fund had not yet concluded.

=== We Are All Bolivia ===
On 2 April 2016, Condori, Román Loayza, Rebeca Delgado, Luis Alfaro, and Félix Santos co-founded We Are All Bolivia (Spanish: Bolivia Somos Todos; BST), a national political party that intends to contest the 2019 national and 2020 regional elections. The party describes itself as committed to full democracy, autonomy, human rights, and a Bolivia free of discrimination.

BST held its first ordinary congress in December 2016 in Sucre. An attempt to hold a national congress in Millares, Potosí, in late July 2017 was frustrated by the opposition of local officials. BST leaders claimed that they were detained by these local leaders and advised not to have the meeting.

=== Gubernatorial candidacy, 2021 ===
In the 2021 regional election, which was delayed from the prior year due to the 2019 Bolivian political crisis, Condori once again stood as We Are All Chuquisaca's candidate for governor.

In the first round of voting on 7 March, Condori won a plurality of 123,885 votes (45,62%), ahead of Juan Carlos León of the Movement Towards Socialism, who received 106,250 votes (39,12%). On 14 March Condori sealed an alliance with moderate Moises Torres and United for Chuquisaca. With 82.67% of the votes counted, Condori had a 21% lead in the 10 April runoff election. In the April 10 runoff election, Condori received 159,519 votos, a 57.32% majority, defeating León who received 118,765 votes (42.68%).

Political offices
Preceded by Efraín Balderas; Interim	Governor of Chuquisaca; 2021–present	Incumbent
