= San Ignacio, Mamoré =

- Town and municipality
- Location in Bolivia
- Coordinates: 13°33′S 64°45′W
- Country: Bolivia
- Department: Beni Department
- Province: Mamoré Province
- Time zone: UTC-4 (BOT)

San Ignacio is a town in Mamoré Province in the Beni Department of northern Bolivia.
