= San Ramón Airport =

- IATA: SRD; ICAO: SLRA

Summary
- Airport type: Public
- Serves: San Ramón, Bolivia
- Elevation AMSL: 459 ft / 140 m
- Coordinates: 13°15′50″S 64°36′15″W

Map
- Location of San Ramón Airport in Bolivia

Runways
Direction	Length		Surface
Direction	m	ft	Surface
16/34	1,935	6,348	Grass
- Source: Landings.com Google Maps GCM

San Ramón Airport (Spanish: Aeropuerto San Ramón, (IATA: SRD, ICAO: SLRA)) is an airstrip serving the town of San Ramón in the Beni Department of Bolivia. The runway is adjacent to the east side of the town.

== See also ==
- Transport in Bolivia
- List of airports in Bolivia
