= 2021 Bolivian regional elections =

Departmental and municipal elections in Bolivia

- 7 March 2021 (first round) and 11 April 2021 (runoff)

Governors, mayors, councillors, and regional assemblies in all 9 departments of Bolivia and their municipalities
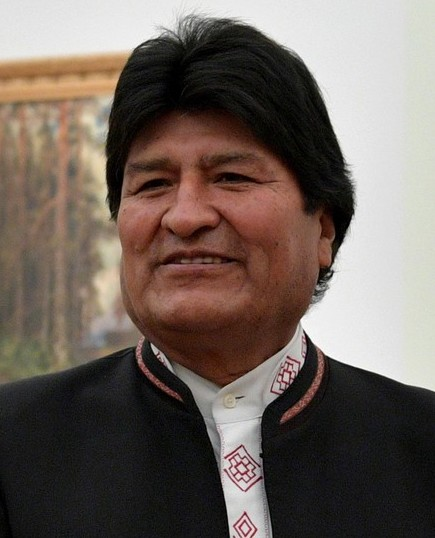

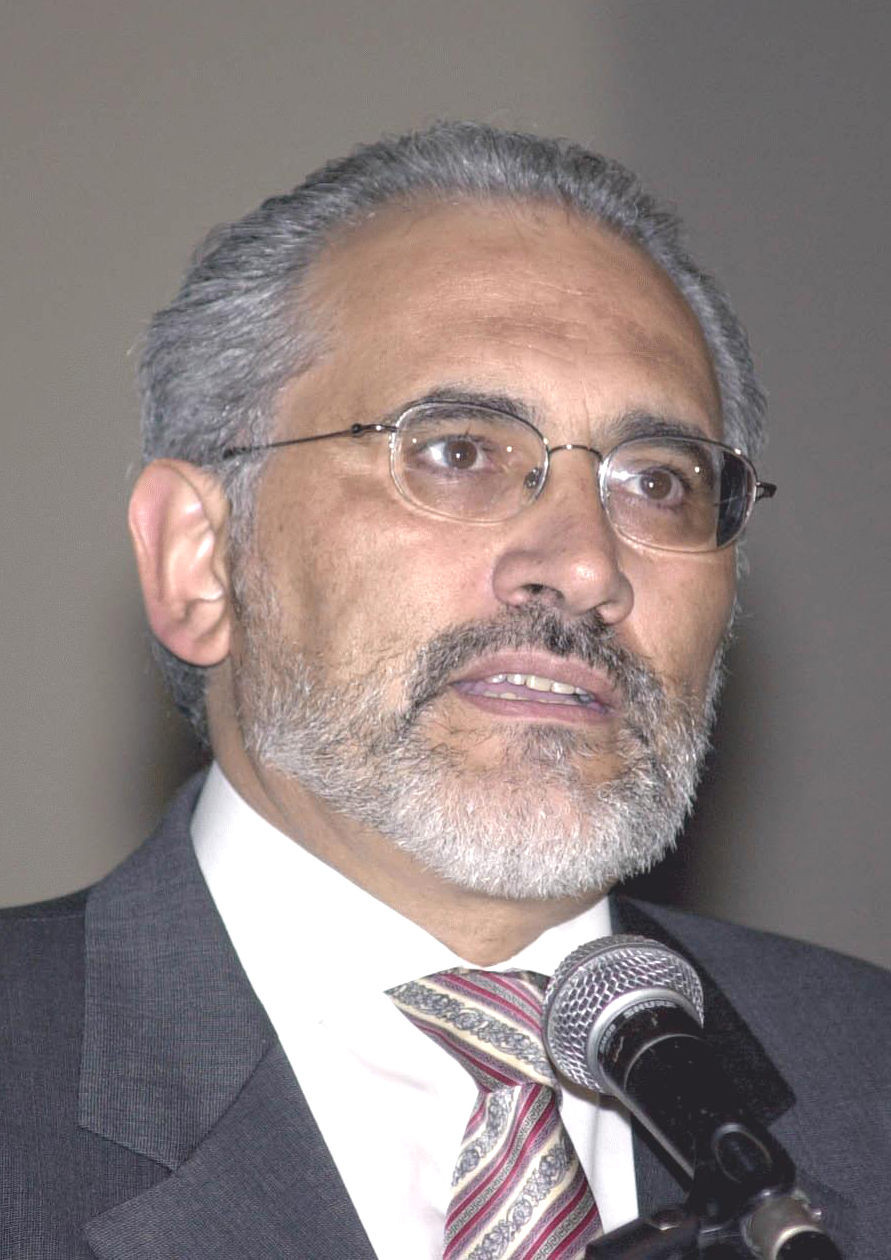

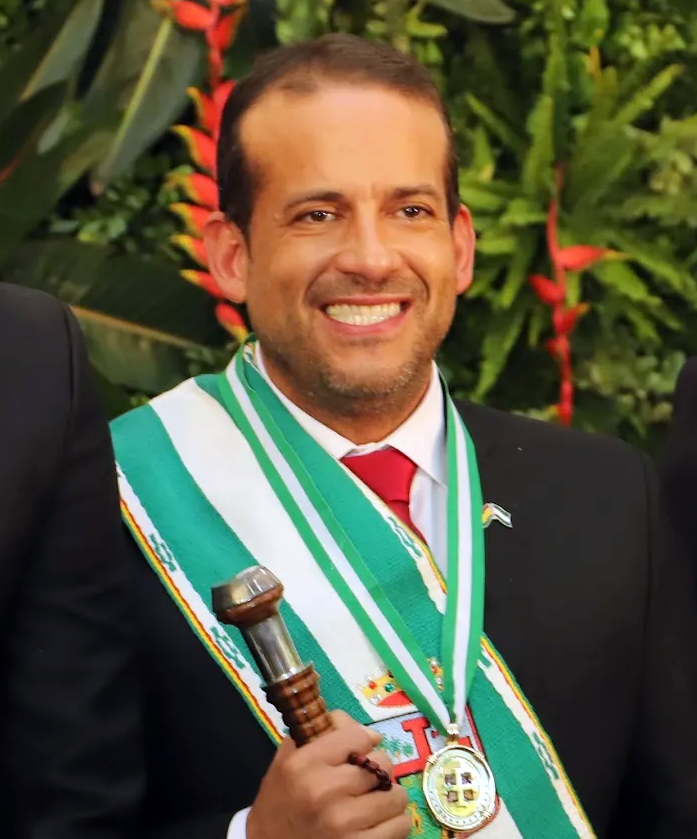

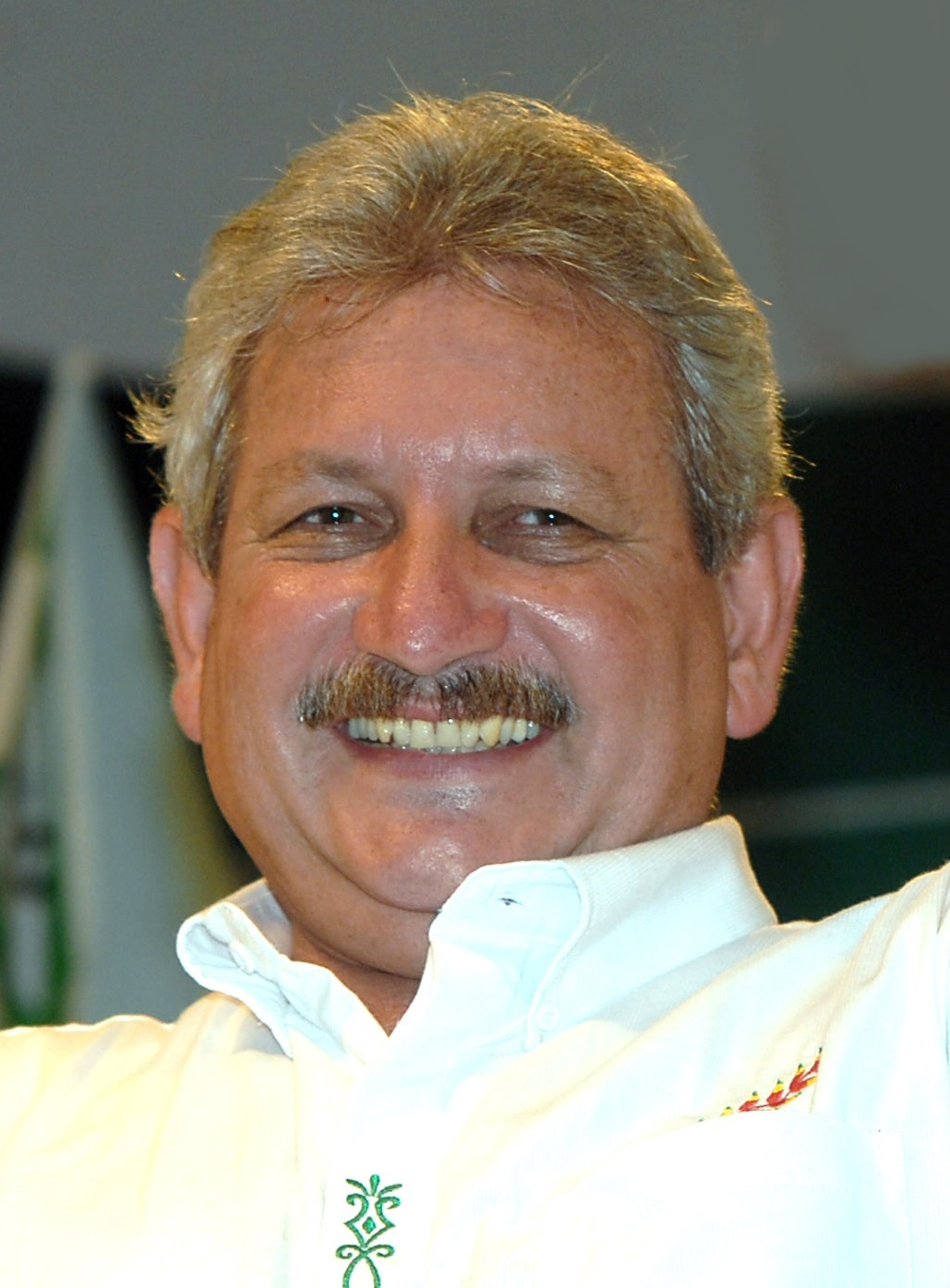

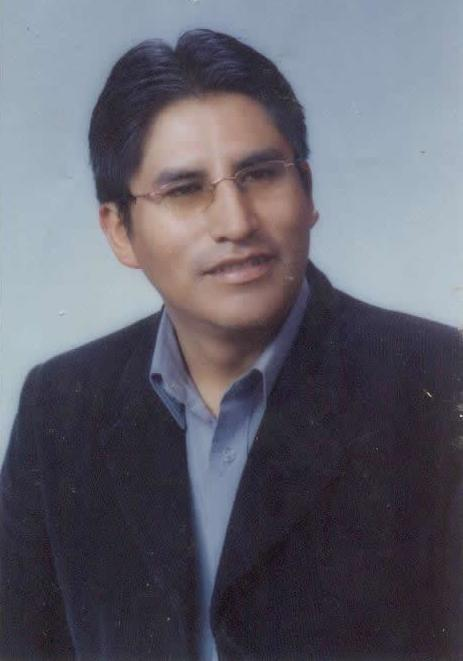

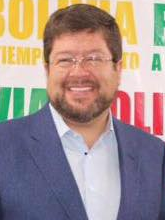
| | Majority party | Minority party | Third party |
|---|---|---|---|
| Leader | Evo Morales | Carlos Mesa | Luis Fernando Camacho |
| Party | MAS-IPSP | Civic Community | Creemos |
| Alliance | none | Many groups (Note: Coalition consisting of FRI and PG Known as Civic Community - Autonomies for Bolivia (C-A) in Cochabamba, Chuquisaca, La Paz, Oruro, Potosí, and Santa Cruz Departmental alliances: Beni: Let's Change (Cambiemos), Let's Create Community (Creemos Comunidad) (Coalition with Creemos) Pando:Coalition with Creemos, National Unity Front, Democrat Social Movement, Columna de Integración. Tarija: Community of Everyone (Comunidad de Todos) (Coalition with PG and SOL.bo Tarija)) | Many groups (Note: Departmental alliances: Beni: Let's Change (Creemos Comunidad) (Coalition with CC) Chuquisaca: Coalition with UN and MNR (until 19 February 2021) Santa Cruz: No coalition. Supported by MDS, PDC, PAN-BOL, and SPT (Gubernatorial only)) |
| Last election | 6 governors, 41.79% 227 mayors, 38.86% | 1 governor (Note: Governor Adrián Oliva of Tarija was elected in 2015 and in 2018 joined the alliance Community of Everyone (Comunidad de Todos) which is allied with Civic Community) new | new |
| Seats won | 3 governors 240 mayors | 0 governors 6 mayors | 1 governor 7 mayors |
| Seat change | ▼3 ▲13 | ▼1 ▲6 | ▲1 ▲7 |
| | Fourth party | Fifth party | Sixth party |
| Leader | Rubén Costas | Félix Patzi (lost re-election) | Samuel Doria Medina |
| Party | MDS | MTS | FUN |
| Alliance | Many groups (Note: Departmental alliances: Beni: United for Beni - Everyone (Todos Unidos por el Beni, Todos) (Coalition with MNR) Cochabamba: We are Renovation (Somos Renovación, Somos) (Coalition with United Peoples) La Paz: For the Common Good - We are the People (Por el Bien Comun - Somos Pueblo, Somos Pueblo) (Coalition with NOS) Santa Cruz: Creemos (Gubernatorial coalition only)) | none | Many groups (Note: Departmental alliances: Beni: Now! (Ahora!) (Coalition with Let's do it for Trinidad) Chuquisaca: Coalition with Creemos and Libre 21 (until 19 February 2021) Oruro: Coalition with Sol Oruro Santa Cruz: Creemos (Gubernatorial coalition only) Tarija: United for Change (Unidos por el Cambio, Unidos) (Coalition with MNR, Democratic Way to Change, PRP, and UNIR)) |
| Last election | 1 governor, 20.58% 24 mayors, 8.89% | 1 governor (Note: Governor Félix Patzi of La Paz was elected as a member of Sovereignty and Liberty (Soberanía y Libertad, Sol.Bo) but left that party and formed the Third System Movement in 2018) new | 0 governors, 3.19% 2 mayors, 7.62% |
| Seats won | 0 governors 5 mayors | 2 governors 10 mayors | 0 governors 0 mayors |
| Seat change | ▼1 ▼19 | ▲1 ▲10 | 0 ▼2 |
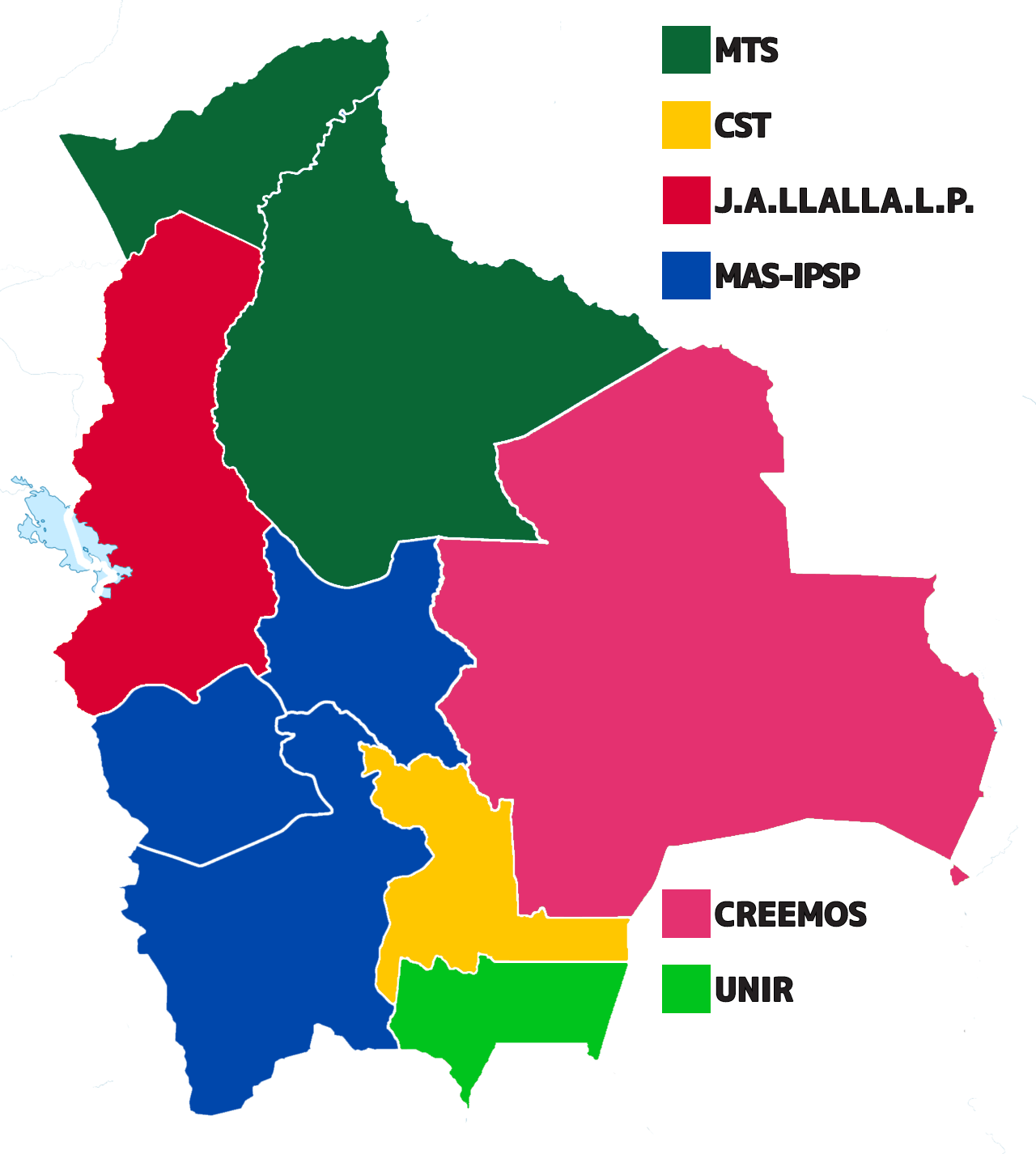
- Gubernatorial results by department

The 2021 Bolivian regional elections were held on 7 March 2021. Departmental and municipal authorities were elected by an electorate of approximately 7 million people. This was the third regional election under the 2009 constitution. It was postponed from the expected date of 2020 due to the 2019 Bolivian political crisis and delays in holding the 2020 Bolivian general election. All elected authorities assumed office on 3 May.

== Process and schedule ==
Regional elections were originally meant to be held in 2020 but were delayed due to the 2019 political crisis and the subsequent scheduling of new presidential elections which in turn were delayed from May to October 2020 due to the COVID-19 pandemic. On 10 November, the Supreme Electoral Tribunal (TSE) put out the call for regional elections to be held on 7 March 2021. Given the closeness of the October general elections and the March subnational elections, Bolivia was the first country in the world to organize two national elections in the midst of the COVID-19 pandemic.

Among the officials to be elected were:

- Governors of all nine departments
- Vice governors of Santa Cruz, Tarija, and Pando departments
- Members of departmental legislative assemblies in each department; 25 seats in these Assemblies will represent minority indigenous communities, and have been selected by traditional usos y costumbres in the weeks prior to the election
- Mayors and Council members in 336 municipalities
- Provincial subgovernors and municipal corregidors (executive authorities) in Beni
- The regional executive, development executives, and nine members of the regional assembly in the autonomous region of Gran Chaco

Altogether, 4,352 municipal officials, 583 departmental officials, and 27 regional officials were elected. Almost every elected office, but not mayor, included a simultaneously elected alternate (suplente) of the same party.

On 24 December, parties presented their political alliances to the TSE and on 28 December candidates were registered. 121 political organizations registered 20,337 candidates for the election, including 11,173 candidates for office and 9,164 alternates. The official campaigning season began on 7 December and ended on 3 March, four days before voting began.

A runoff system was also in place in the case of governors but not mayors. Any candidate who won 50% of the vote or who reached 40% with a difference of at least 10% in relation to the second most voted candidate would be proclaimed the winner. If no candidate reached this threshold, a runoff between the top two candidates would occur on 11 April. In the event of no second round, authorities would take office between 30 and 31 March and in the event of a runoff, authorities would take office between 3 and 5 May. However, the President of the TSE Salvador Romero later reported that all winning candidates would take office on 3 May in order to avoid difficulties surrounding differences in term-lengths between municipal and departmental authorities in the 2026 regional elections.

Voting is compulsory in Bolivia. For three months after elections, those without suffrage certificates showing proof of voting are barred from bank procedures, attaining a passport, among others. However, due to concerns regarding COVID-19, on 3 March the TSE provided an exception to this rule for citizens 60 years old and above.

=== Conduct on election day ===
As with previous elections, delegates of the Organization of American States (OAS) were sent as observers to the subnationals. In keeping with MAS criticisms of the OAS, President Luis Arce announced that he would not attend any events where the OAS was present due to their "nefarious" role in the 2019 election. This included the voting day opening ceremony at the Supreme Electoral Tribunal. He stated that he would instead wait for the results at his home and would then evaluate them at the Casa Grande del Pueblo, the government palace.

The TSE reported that the majority of polling locations opened within a timely manner with a few isolated incidents in which they did not open at 8 a.m due to the absence of jurors. According to TSE guidelines, voting could not commence unless there were at least 3 electoral jurors overseeing voting. In the absence of such jurors, the Electoral Notary could appoint the number required from among Bolivians who were registered and present at that polling site. A total of 208,554 jurors had been chosen by the TSE prior to the elections.

In the indigenous community of Florida in the Pando Department, the election date was postponed to 21 March due to heavy rainfall which caused technical difficulties the day before the elections.

== Political parties and candidates ==
=== Movement for Socialism ===
For the nationally governing Movement for Socialism (MAS–IPSP), the subnational elections confronted the party with the challenge of consolidating regional power following the 2019 political crisis. While President Luis Arce had won a one round victory of 55.10% the previous year, it was notably less than the 61.36% mandate given to Evo Morales the year before the 2015 regional elections, and despite holding governors in six of the nine departments, none of the incumbents elected in 2015 still held their seats, with interim governors taking their place as a result of the 2019 crisis. Perhaps the biggest dilemma facing MAS was the continued role of Morales within the party who returned to the country in 2020 after a year of exile in Argentina. While Morales remained the national chief of MAS, early indications showed that the influence of the former president over the party had declined. Candidates endorsed by Morales in numerous departments were not chosen by the regional wings of MAS. In other departments, regional MAS assemblies proclaimed their candidates before Morales had the opportunity to arrive.

Morales' frequent interference ultimately resulted in the so-called silletazo on 14 December 2020. The situation arose when the popular Mario Cronenbold was replaced as the party's candidate for Governor of Santa Cruz by Morales' former government minister Carlos Romero. Public outcry by the meeting's participants led to one person throwing and hitting Morales with a plastic chair. The silletazo was met by various reactions within and outside of the party. Opposition community leader Rafael Quispe stated that the event was a sign that Morales had "finished his cycle and ... should go home", while the MAS-aligned Segundina Flores of the Bartolina Sisa Confederation affirmed that while Morales "deserves respect" he should not be selecting candidates by the pointing of a finger. Many anti and pro-MAS individuals expressed their discontent at Morales' "dedazo" (Point of a finger appointments of candidates) and younger MAS militants made demands of "renovation" within the party.

The hands-on participation of Morales in the numerous MAS campaigns contrasted with what political analyst Marcelo Arequipa described as the "neutral actor" of President Luis Arce. Arequipa described Arce as a "managing president" who "presents himself as someone who does not care about the internal political dispute of the MAS, what interests him is to govern ... and carry out a more or less clean political and economic management." While Arce upheld the MAS claim that the 2019 crisis was a coup d'état, he maintained a relatively neutral stance towards the regional elections, and according to the MAS Senator Luis Adolfo Flores, "I have not seen the president in a political campaign." In this way, while Morales handled the regional campaigns on the ground, Arce focused on his national agenda and, as Morales appointed many of the candidates, he would be thus responsible for any eventual losses.

MAS was the only party to present candidacies in all 336 municipal contests, was unopposed in 28 municipalities, and faced only a single opponent in 65 more municipalities. Despite this, internal disagreements and disputes weakened the blue party within some of its historical bases of support. Perhaps the greatest example was in El Alto, the historic center of MAS support, where the popular former president of the senate Eva Copa was expelled from the party. This due to the fact that she presented herself as El Alto's mayoral candidate for the Jallalla La Paz group after not being nominated as the MAS candidate. Support for her often gave her a 70% lead in national polls, far above the MAS candidate. Similar situations in which the individual or individuals preferred by regional MAS sectors weren't chosen as the party's candidate occurred in many other major departments and municipalities. According to Morales, "The MAS–IPSP will not make party alliances and will maintain its identity. Our alliance is only with social movements and society."

=== Opposition ===
While the conflicts within MAS between the old guard and those looking for new leadership did weaken the party, the opposition also failed to consolidate into a unified front for the subnational elections. Among the opposition parties, a total of thirty-nine political alliances had been formed with twenty-nine registered with the Supreme Electoral Tribunal and the rest registered with departmental agencies. Marcelo Arequipa state that "MAS is the only party that has a national structure, the rest of the political organizations do not necessarily have no structure, but rather have no intention of expanding territorially, they are confined to those spaces where they believe they are stronger."

On a national level, the opposition was fragmented between a total of five major factions. The largest was Civic Community (CC) formed in 2018 by former president Carlos Mesa composed and led on a national level by the Revolutionary Left Front (FRI). Another rising faction was Luis Fernando Camacho's Creemos alliance which despite only being formed in 2020 received third place and won the Santa Cruz Department in that year's general election. Maintaining their presence were the traditional anti-MAS groups of the Morales era, the Democrat Social Movement (MDS) of Santa Cruz governor Rubén Costas and the National Unity Front (UN) of businessman Samuel Doria Medina. Another newly formed group was the Third System Movement (Movimiento Tercer Sistema, MTS) of La Paz Department governor Félix Patzi who formed the party in 2018.

While the opposition field was crowded and divided, the numerous groups were able to form numerous department-level alliances with regional parties as well as each other. The largest united front for the opposition was in Santa Cruz, the longtime anti-MAS base of support. Here, the major groups threw their support behind Luis Fernando Camacho's gubernatorial bid. On the other hand, all five major factions were among 13 other parties contesting the La Paz governorship. The remaining minor parties, while presenting their own candidates on both a municipal and departmental level, also formed coalitions amongst themselves and the large factions. Parties like the Revolutionary Nationalist Movement (MNR) made alliances with both the Democrats and UN as well as presented their own candidates by department. Some regional parties such as Together for the Call of the Peoples (Juntos al Llamado de los Pueblos, Jallalla) in La Paz and Join (Súmate) in Cochabamba also performed well on their own without aligning themselves with national parties and alliances.

=== Nationally certified parties and alliances ===
| Party | Participating in Elections in the Department of ... ? | | | | | | | | |
|---|---|---|---|---|---|---|---|---|---|
| Party | Chuquisaca | La Paz | Santa Cruz | Cochabamba | Tarija | Potosí | Oruro | Beni | Pando |
| Solidarity Civic Unity (Unidad Cívica Solidaridad, UCS) | ✗ | ✓ | ✓ | ✓ | ✓ | ✓ | ✓ | ✗ | ✗ |
| Creemos (Creemos) | ✗ | ✗ | ✓ | ✗ | ✗ | ✗ | ✗ | ✓ | ✗ |
| Christian Democratic Party (Partido Demócrata Cristiano, PDC) | ✗ | ✓ | ✗ | ✓ | ✓ | ✗ | ✓ | ✗ | ✗ |
| Movement for Socialism (Movimiento al Socialismo, MAS-IPSP) | ✓ | ✓ | ✓ | ✓ | ✓ | ✓ | ✓ | ✓ | ✓ |
| Front for Victory Bolivia (Frente Para la Victoria, FPV) | ✓ | ✓ | ✓ | ✓ | ✓ | ✓ | ✓ | ✓ | ✓ |
| Bolivian National Action Party (Partido de Acción Nacional Boliviano, PAN-BOL) | ✓ | ✓ | ✓ | ✓ | ✓ | ✓ | ✓ | ✓ | ✓ |
| Revolutionary Left Front (Frente Revolucionario de Izquierda, FRI) | ✗ | ✗ | ✗ | ✗ | ✗ | ✗ | ✗ | ✗ | ✗ |
| Civic Community (Comunidad Ciudadana, CC) | ✓ | ✓ | ✓ | ✓ | ✓ | ✓ | ✓ | ✓ | ✗ |
| National Unity Front (Frente de Unidad Nacional, UN) | ✓ | ✓ | ✓ | ✓ | ✗ | ✗ | ✗ | ✓ | ✗ |
| Democrat Social Movement (Movimiento Demócrata Social, MDS) | ✗ | ✗ | ✓ | ✓ | ✗ | ✓ | ✗ | ✓ | ✗ |
| Revolutionary Nationalist Movement (Movimiento Nacionalista Revolucionario, MNR) | ✓ | ✗ | ✓ | ✗ | ✗ | ✗ | ✗ | ✓ | ✗ |
| Nationalist Democratic Action (Acción Democrática Nacionalista, ADN) | ✗ | ✗ | ✓ | ✗ | ✗ | ✓ | ✗ | ✗ | ✗ |
| Third System Movement (Movimiento Tercer Sistema, MTS) | ✓ | ✓ | ✓ | ✓ | ✓ | ✓ | ✓ | ✓ | ✓ |

=== Gender ===
Bolivian election lists are required to observe parity in gender by alternating male and female candidates and ensuring that women head at least 50% of each party's lists for legislative positions. In executive positions, however, women are a minority of candidates: there 249 women (14% of candidates) running for mayor of municipalities, and 7 women (8%) running for governor. Altogether, 317 women comprise 16% of all executive office candidates in the election. Women make up 51.1% of the electorate.

== Gubernatorial elections ==
=== Beni Department ===
2021 Beni gubernatorial election
- 7 March 2021
- Opinion polls
- Registered: 275,795
- Turnout: 83.03% (▲2.95 pp)
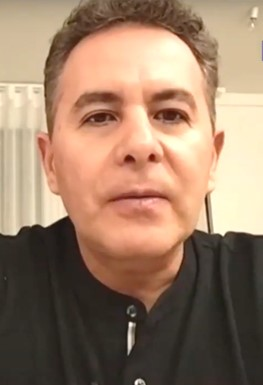

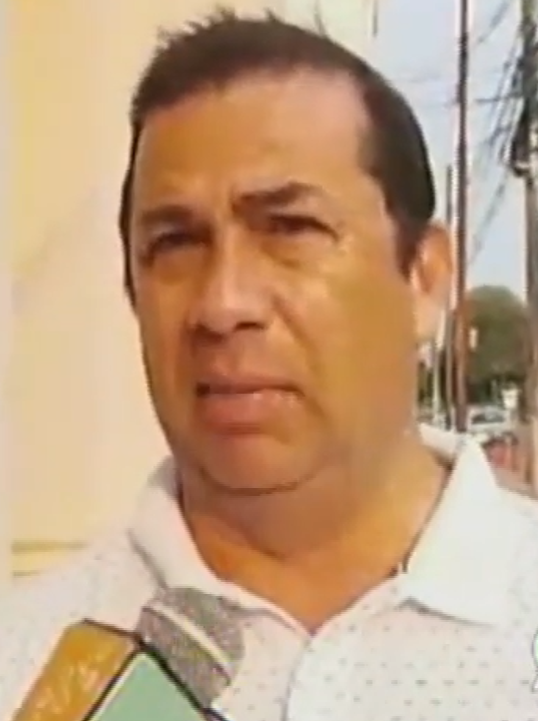

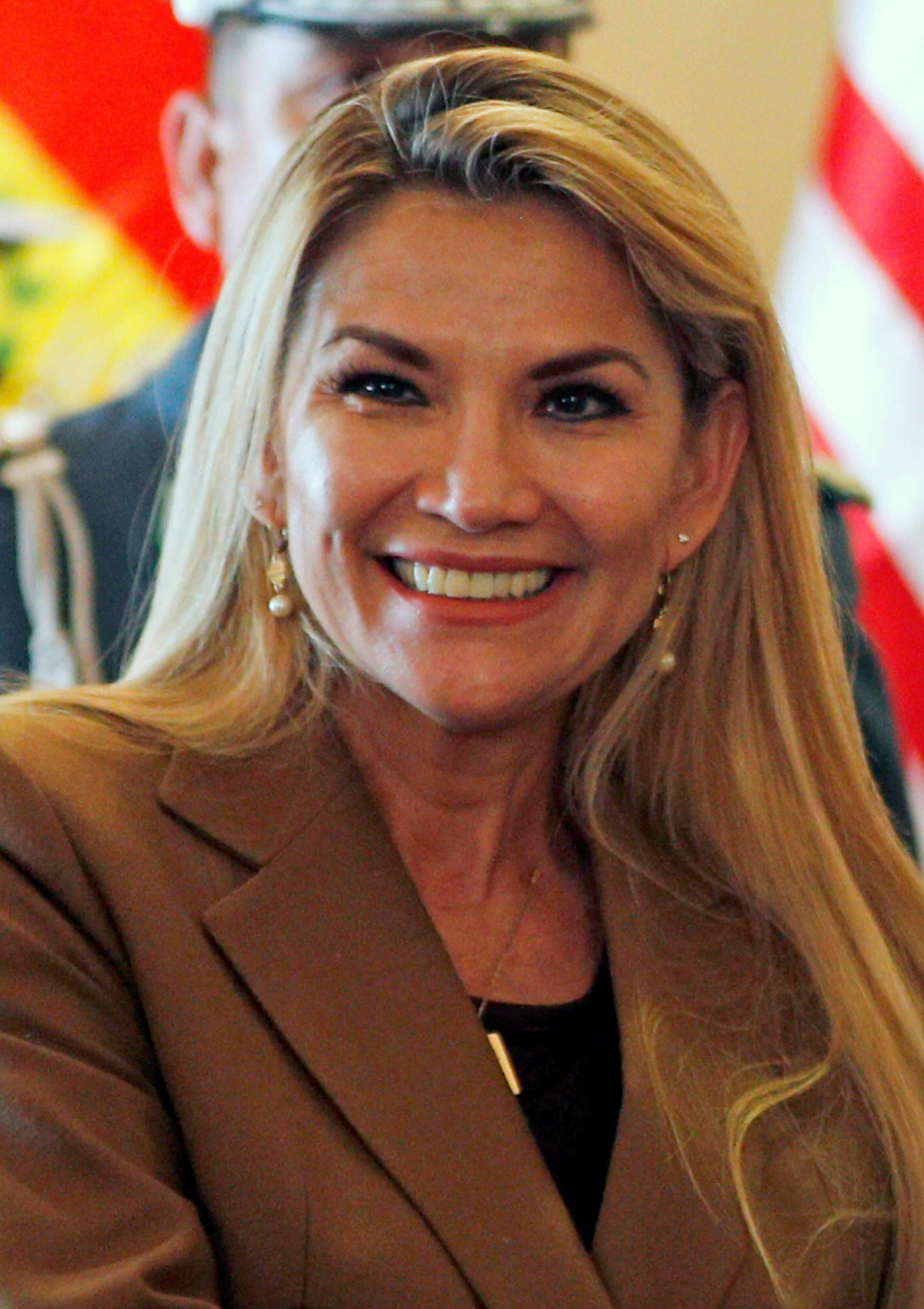

| Candidate | Alejandro Unzueta | Alex Ferrier |
| Party | BUSCO | MAS-IPSP |
| Alliance | MTS | — |
| Popular vote | 83,732 | 44,494 |
| Percentage | 41.79% | 22.21% |
| Candidate | Jeanine Áñez | Fernando Aponte |
| Party | Independent | MDS |
| Alliance | Ahora! (Note: Coalition consisting of Hagámoslo por Trinidad and UN.) | TODOS (Note: Coalition consisting of MDS and MNR.) |
| Popular vote | 26,620 | 24,149 |
| Percentage | 13.29% | 12.05% |
Governor before election
Fanor Amapo (acting)
MAS-IPSP
Governor after election
Alejandro Unzueta
MTS

Acting governor Fanor Amapo (MAS) was not nominated for election to a full term. Alejandro Unzueta, a dentist and political outsider of the Third System Movement, defeated eight opponents, achieving 41.79 percent of the vote, a large enough plurality to circumvent a runoff. MAS candidate Alex Ferrier —the previously elected governor— failed to regain the office he resigned in 2019, achieving 22.21 percent of the vote. Likewise, former president Jeanine Áñez of the Ahora! alliance garnered 13.29 percent of the vote. The remaining six candidates reached a combined 22.71 percent of the vote.

2021 Beni gubernatorial election
| Candidate | Party | Votes | % |
|---|---|---|---|
| Alejandro Unzueta | Third System Movement | 83,732 | 41.79 |
| Alex Ferrier | Movement for Socialism | 44,494 | 22.21 |
| Jeanine Áñez | Ahora! | 26,620 | 13.29 |
| Fernando Aponte | All United for Beni | 24,149 | 12.05 |
| Ruddy Destre | Cambiemos (Note: Coalition consisting of Creemos, FRI, Construyendo Futuro, and PAN-BOL.) | 6,616 | 3.30 |
| Javier Chávez | Autonomous Nationalities | 6,466 | 3.23 |
| Marco Antonio Suárez | Mojeños Ethnic Peoples | 4,898 | 2.44 |
| Jesus Alberto Rivero | Unity and Hope for Beni | 2,107 | 1.05 |
| Marcial Fabricano | Front for Victory | 1,280 | 0.64 |
| Total | | 200,362 | 100.00 |
| Valid votes | | 200,362 | 87.50 |
| Invalid/blank votes | | 28,630 | 12.50 |
| Total votes | | 228,992 | 100.00 |
| Registered voters/turnout | | 275,795 | 83.03 |
Source: Plurinational Electoral Organ | Electoral Atlas

=== Chuquisaca Department ===
2021 Chuquisaca gubernatorial election
- 7 March 2021 (first round) and 11 April 2021 (runoff)
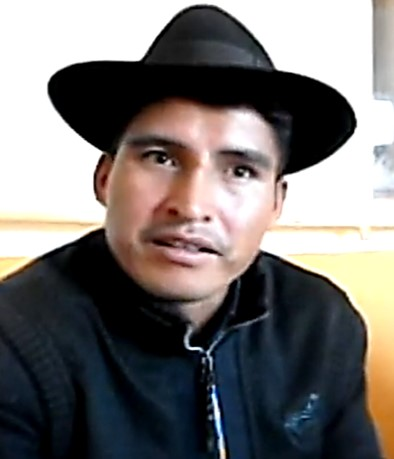

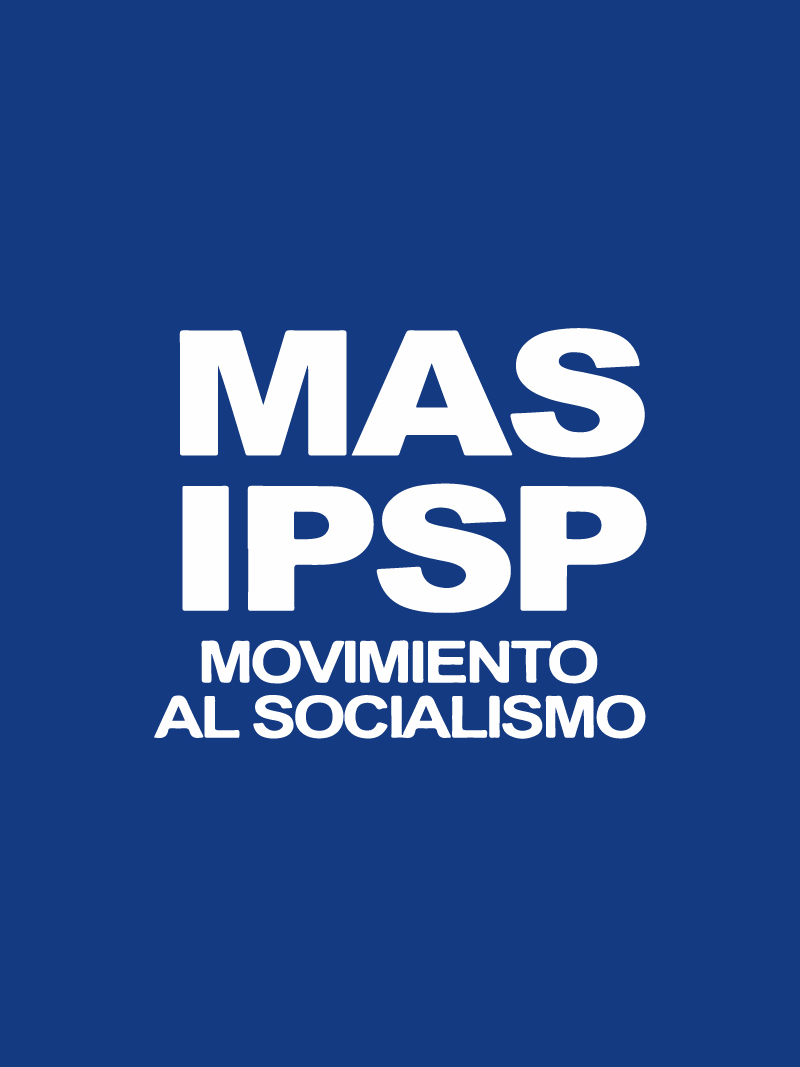
| Nominee | Damián Condori | Juan Carlos León | Alvaro Barañado |
| Party | CST | MAS-IPSP | BSTH |
| First round | 123,885; 45.62% | 106,250; 39.12% | 13,793; 5.08% |
| Runoff | 159,519; 57.32% | 118,765; 42.68% | eliminated |
Governor before election
Efrain Balderas (interim)
MAS-IPSP
Elected Governor
Damián Condori
CST

A total of sixteen political groups (six parties, four political alliances, five citizens groups, and one indigenous group) presented candidates for the subnational elections in the Chuquisaca Department. Of these groups, nine presented candidates for Governor of Chuquisaca.

MAS nominated Juan Carlos León as its candidate for governor. León had previously served a prison sentence, being arrested on charges of corruption in 2020 during the interim government of Jeanine Áñez, though he claimed his sentence had been politically motivated. Meanwhile the opposition groups continued discussions in relation to the formation of candidates up until the final hours of the deadline for the registration of candidates.

The National Unity Front aligned itself with Libre 21 made of the Revolutionary Nationalist Movement and the Movement for Sovereignty along with Creemos and chose Roberto Balderas as its candidate. The alliance had no acronym.

On 18 December 2020, it was announced that Alvaro Barañado would be presented as a candidate for governor on behalf of United for the New Chuquisaca (Unidos por el Nuevo Chuquisaca, UNIDOS), a united alliance of the national MNR, Christian Democratic Party, Revolutionary Left Front, Democrat Social Movement, and the departmental Liberty and Renewed Democracy (Libertad y Democracia Renovadora, Lider), Pact of Social Integration (Pacto de Integración Social, PAIS), and the Multicultural Productive Movement (Movimiento Multicultural Productivo, MMP).

Despite the FRI being a component of Civic Community, the departmental wing of CC, Civic Community - Autonomies for Bolivia (C-A), opted to present its own candidate, Rodolfo Payllo. The MNR, in turn, divided its support three ways as a member of both Libre 21 with UN and UNIDOS with the Democrats as well as on its own with Faustino Vera as its candidate for governor. A lead contender for the Chuquisaca governorship was Damián Condori. Condori broke with MAS prior to the 2015 regional elections, contending for the governorship of Chuquisaca and receiving second place with 42.49% against the MAS candidate. In November of that year, he was imprisoned for two years under accusations of receiving resources from the Indigenous Fund. Condori was a member of We are all Bolivia (BST) but instead registered as a candidate for We are all Chuquisaca (Chuquisaca Somos Todos, CST). By the date of registration on 28 December, it was found out that Alvaro Barañado had switched parties, leaving UNIDOS and presenting himself as a candidate for the departmental wing of BST, BST-Chuquisaca (BSTC). UNIDOS instead nominated Moisés Torres Chivé.

While Condori of CST and León of MAS maintained a large lead in polling, the secondary alliances made numerous attempts to consolidate into a single front. On 19 February, C-A's Rodolfo Payllo met with Balderas of UN, Torres of UNIDOS, and Barañado of BSTC to discuss the formation of a united coalition. The meeting succeeded in convincing UN's Balderas to drop out and endorse UNIDOS the following day but was ultimately unsuccessful in forming an alliance. Discussions between UNIDOS and BSTC continued up until a few days before the end of the campaign but neither candidate was willing to drop out so close to the elections, instead demanding that the other do so. While none of the three remaining alliances ruled out a last minute agreement, they ultimately failed to formalize any agreement.

Prior to the elections, Jimmy Gonzales of the Front for Victory was disqualified for not meeting eligibility requirements. Carlos Veizaga of the Bolivian National Action Party was replaced by Ángel Mamani Zárate, though the latter did not appear in the party's campaign.

==== Opinion polls ====
| Poll source | Date released | Damián Condori | Juan C. León | Rodolfo Payllo | Moisés T. Chivé | Alvaro Barañado | Faustino Vera | Roberto Balderas | Carlos Veizaga | Jimmy Gonzales |
|---|---|---|---|---|---|---|---|---|---|---|
| Ciesmori | 7 March 2021 (exit poll) | 43.9% | 40.5% | 6.6% | 5.0% | 2.8% | 1.2% | – | – | – |
| Ciesmori | 24 January 2021 | 21.1% | 19% | 3.1% | 4.5% | 5.6% | 0.8% | 3.4% | 1.4% | 0.8% |

==== Results ====
The failure of C-A, UNIDOS, and BSTC to secure an alliance meant that their three candidates split the vote amongst themselves. Damián Condori of CST and Juan Carlos León of MAS won first and second place respectively and moved on to the 11 April runoff. Condori was ultimately the victor, defeating León by over ten points. In his first statement as governor-elect, Condori announced his intent to send a letter to outgoing governor Efraín Balderas to initiate a "transparent transition".

Candidates for Governor of the Chuquisaca Department:

| Candidate | Party | First round | | Second round | |
| Candidate | Party | Votes | % | Votes | % |
|---|---|---|---|---|---|
| Damián Condori | We are all Chuquisaca | 123,885 | 45.62 | 159,519 | 57.32 |
| Juan Carlos León | Movement for Socialism | 106,250 | 39.12 | 118,765 | 42.68 |
| Alvaro Barañado | We are all Bolivia Chuquisaca | 13,793 | 5.08 | | |
| Moisés Torres Chivé | United for the New Chuquisaca (MDS) | 12,906 | 4.75 | | |
| Rodolfo Payllo | Civic Community - Autonomies for Bolivia | 12,779 | 4.71 | | |
| Faustino Vera | Revolutionary Nationalist Movement | 1,958 | 0.72 | | |
| Total | | 271,571 | 100.00 | 278,284 | 100.00 |
| Valid votes | | 271,571 | 86.02 | 278,284 | 94.30 |
| Invalid/blank votes | | 44,122 | 13.98 | 16,817 | 5.70 |
| Total votes | | 315,693 | 100.00 | 295,101 | 100.00 |
| Registered voters/turnout | | 373,847 | 84.44 | 373,588 | 78.99 |
Source: Plurinational Electoral Organ

=== Cochabamba Department ===
2021 Cochabamba gubernatorial election
- 7 March 2021
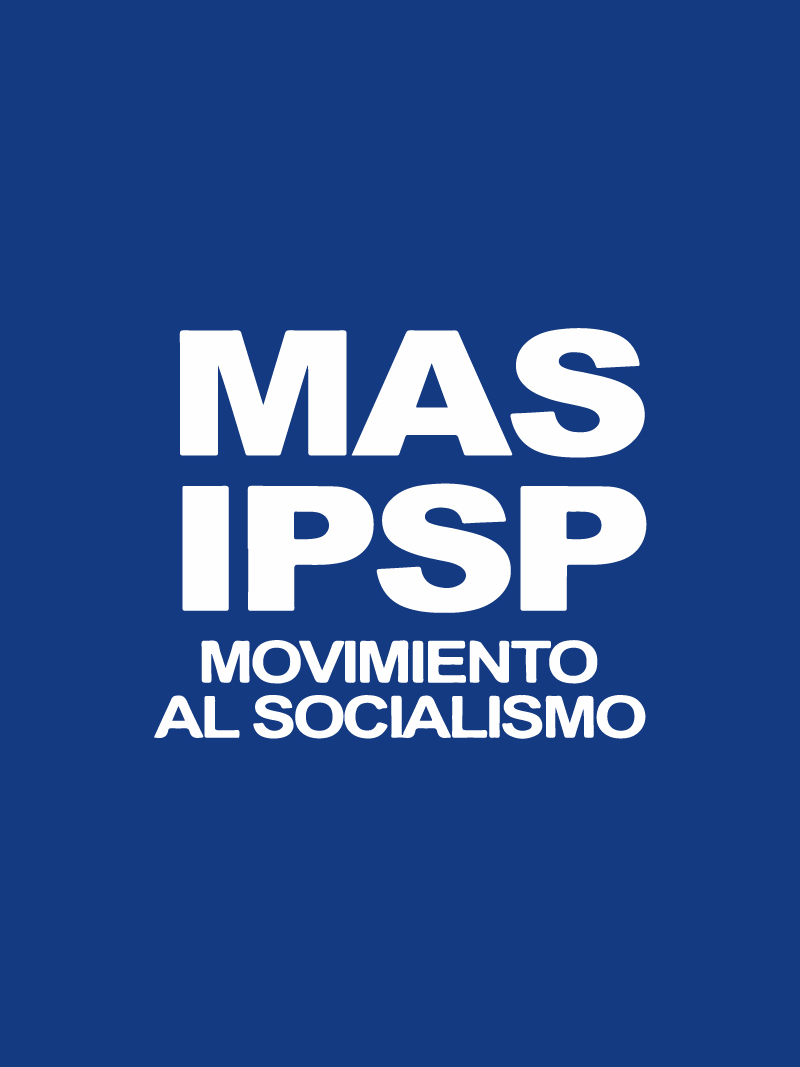
| Nominee | Humberto Sánchez | Henry Paredes | José Carlos Sánchez |
| Party | MAS-IPSP | Súmate | MTS (Bolivia) |
| Popular vote | 609,973 | 267,308 | 78,805 |
| Percentage | 57.44% | 25.17% | 7.42% |
Governor before election
Esther Soria (interim)
MAS-IPSP
Elected Governor
Humberto Sánchez
MAS-IPSP

A total of seventeen political groups (six parties, four political alliances, and seven citizens groups) presented candidates for the subnational elections in the Cochabamba Department. Of these groups, nine presented candidates for Governor of Cochabamba.

The top three contenders for governor all held long political portfolios within the department. Humberto Sánchez of MAS as mayor of Sacaba, Juan Flores of United for Cochabamba (Unidos por Cochabamba, UNIDOS.CBBA) as President of the Civic Committee, and Henry Paredes of Join (Súmate) as a member of the Chamber of Deputies. Polling indicated a clear triumph for Sánchez in the high thirties with Flores and Paredes contesting for second place in the runoff. However, on 9 February it was announced that Paredes had contracted COVID-19 from which he recovered but which hurt his campaign, dropping him from second to fourth in a poll by Focaliza.

The Social Democrat Movement formed an alliance with United Peoples (Pueblo Unido) to form the We are Renovation (Somos Renovación, SOMOS) alliance with Fausto Challapa as its candidate. Pueblo Unido had withdrawn from the 2020 general election to focus its efforts on the subnational elections.

On 2 February, the party delegate of the Christian Democratic Party Froilán Calderón announced the group's intent to withdraw from the elections nationwide "in order not to disperse the vote in other cities". However, this was denied two days later with the party stating that it would remain in the race. 45 of the PDC's candidates were for offices in Cochabamba, the most of any of the departments it was running in.

==== Opinion polls ====
| Poll source | Date released | Humberto Sánchez | Henry Paredes | José C. Sánchez | José Luis Flores | Juan Flores | Reynaldo Becerra | Fausto Challapa | William Zapata | Limber Morejón | Would not vote | Undecided |
|---|---|---|---|---|---|---|---|---|---|---|---|---|
| Ciesmori | 8 March 2021 (exit poll) | 52.0% | 27.3% | 8.1% | 2.8% | 4.6% | 1.4% | 1.7% | 1.2% | 0.9% | – | – |
| Ciesmori | 7 March 2021 (exit poll) | 50.9% | 27.2% | 7.8% | 4.1% | 3.7% | 2.1% | 1.7% | 1.5% | 1.0% | – | – |
| Focaliza | 21 February 2021 | 62.5% | 6.0% | 7.2% | 2.3% | 11.3% | 3.4% | 2.2% | 2.8% | 2.3% | – | – |
| Ciesmori | 11 February 2021 | 39.7% | 5.8% | 2.0% | 5.4% | 5.7% | 0.9% | 0.7% | 2.6% | – | 11.5% | 25.7% |
| Ciesmori | 24 January 2021 | 36.3% | 4.3% | 1.3% | 4.4% | 6.1% | 2.0% | 0.7% | 4.5% | 1.9% | – | – |

==== Results ====
Humberto Sánchez of MAS-IPSP won a one-round victory of 57.44% of the vote making him the elected governor.

Candidates for Governor of the Cochabamba Department:

| Candidate | Party | Votes | % |
|---|---|---|---|
| Humberto Sánchez | Movement for Socialism | 609,973 | 57.44 |
| Henry Paredes | Súmate | 267,308 | 25.17 |
| José Carlos Sánchez | Third System Movement | 78,805 | 7.42 |
| Juan Flores | United for Cochabamba | 46,030 | 4.33 |
| José Luis Flores | Civic Community - Autonomies for Bolivia | 21,875 | 2.06 |
| Fausto Challapa | We are Renovation (MDS) | 15,504 | 1.46 |
| Limber Morejón | Christian Democratic Party | 8,327 | 0.78 |
| William Zapata | Bolivian National Action Party | 7,494 | 0.71 |
| Reynaldo Becerra | Front for Victory | 6,665 | 0.63 |
| Total | | 1,061,981 | 100.00 |
| Valid votes | | 1,061,981 | 91.14 |
| Invalid/blank votes | | 103,245 | 8.86 |
| Total votes | | 1,165,226 | 100.00 |
| Registered voters/turnout | | 1,352,936 | 86.13 |
Source: Plurinational Electoral Organ

=== La Paz Department ===
==== First round ====
2021 La Paz gubernatorial election
- 7 March 2021 (first round) and 11 April (runoff)
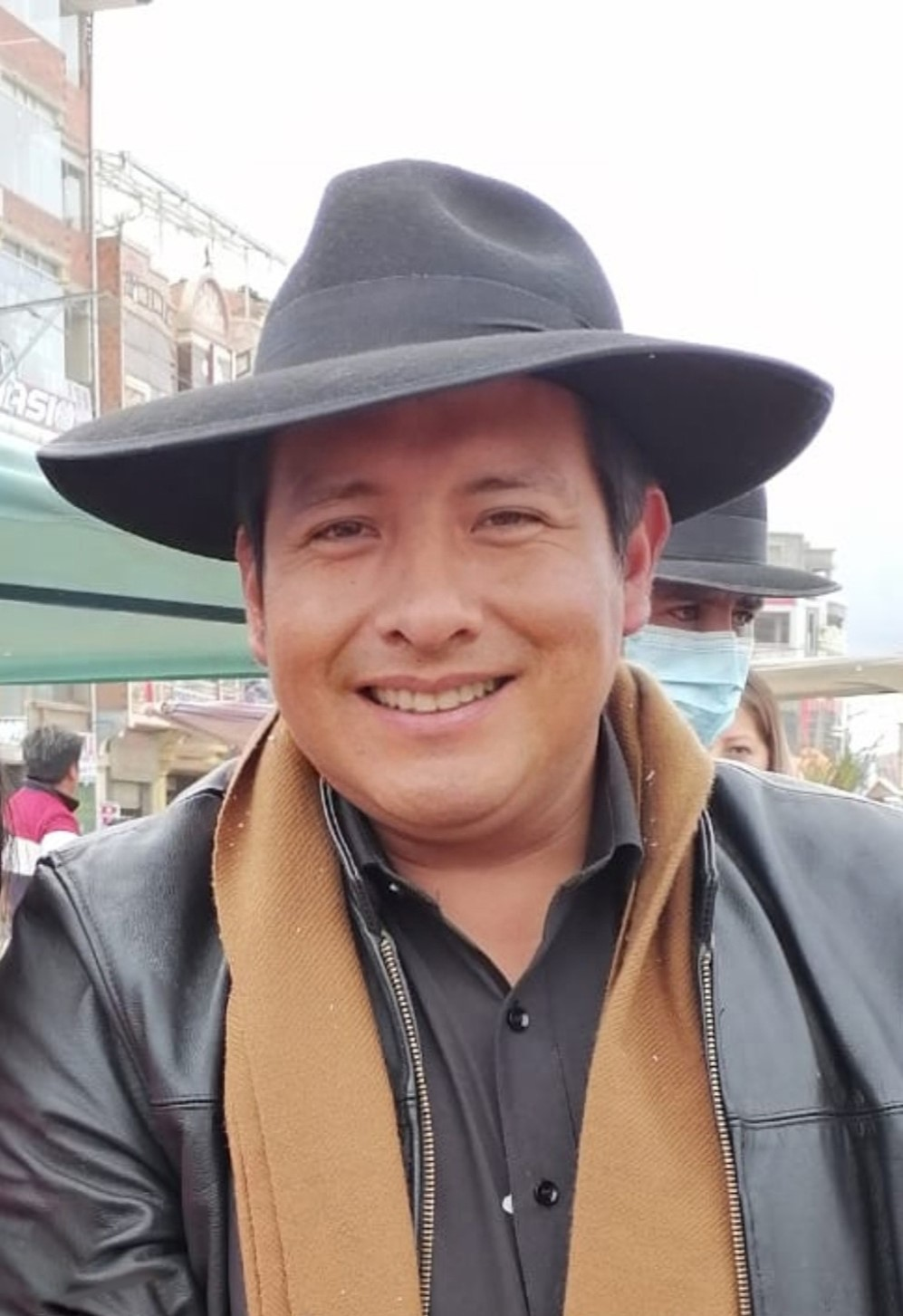

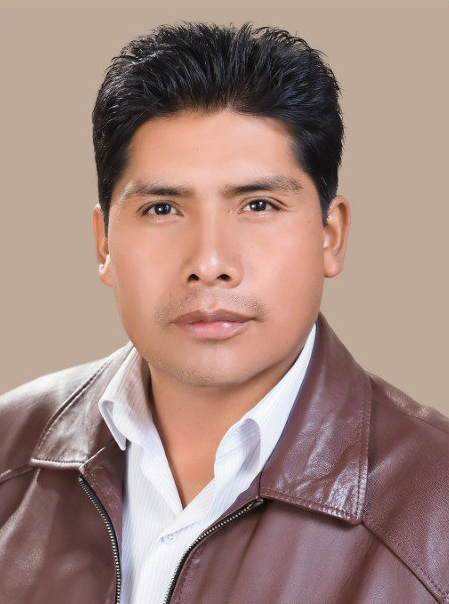

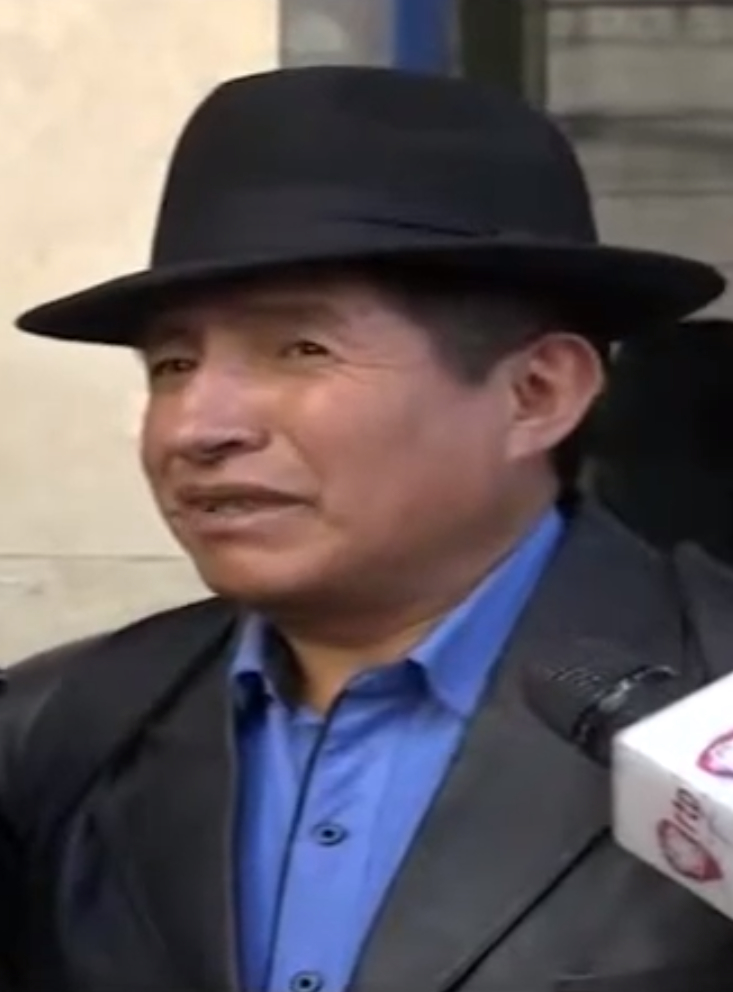

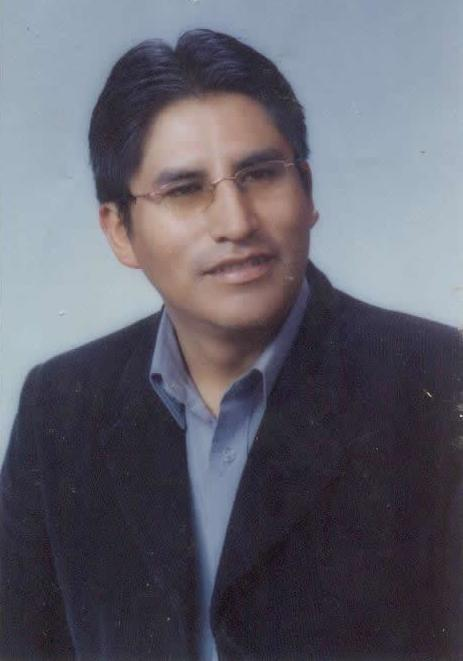
| Nominee | Santos Quispe | Franklin Flores | Rafael Quispe |
| Party | J.A.LLALLA.L.P. | MAS-IPSP | Democrat Social Movement |
| Alliance | none | none | MDS and NOS |
| First round | 392,132; 25.18% | 618,221; 39.70% | 349,384; 22.44% |
| Runoff | 831,816; 55.23% | 674,220; 44.77% | Eliminated |
| Nominee | Félix Patzi |
| Party | MTS (Bolivia) |
| Alliance | none |
| First round | 67,948; 4.36% |
| Runoff | Eliminated |
Governor before election
Félix Patzi
MTS (Bolivia)
Elected Governor
Santos Quispe
J.A.LLALLA.L.P.

A total of twenty-nine political groups and alliances presented candidates for the subnational elections in the La Paz Department. Of these, fourteen presented candidates for Governor of La Paz, the most of any department.

The early front runner was the indigenous leader Felipe "Mallku" Quispe of Together for the Call of the Peoples (Juntos al Llamado de los Pueblos, J.A.LLALLA.L.P.). The first poll by Ciesmori gave Quispe 25% of the intended vote despite the fact that he had died of cardiac arrest on 19 January 2021. After two weeks of deliberation by party leadership, Santos Quispe, Felipe Quispe's son, was chosen amongst seven other candidates to head the party ticket.

Another candidate to die was Samuel Sea of Civic Community due to complications of COVID-19. Sea was replaced by Mateo Laura on 4 February. Laura had been the Prefect of La Paz for the Revolutionary Left Movement during the second administration of Gonzalo Sánchez de Lozada.

Another contender was the indigenous community leader Rafael "Tata" Quispe whose party the New Social Option (Nueva Opción Social, NOS) allied with the Democrat Social Movement in 2019 to form the For the Common Good - We are the People (Por el Bien Comun - Somos Pueblo, PBCSP) alliance. On 12 February, Quispe was sentenced to two years in prison for political harassment. The charges stemmed from a complaint by Felipa Huanca of MAS who claimed that Quispe's charges of corruption had harmed her candidacy and caused her to lose in the 2015 regional elections. In response, Quispe stated that he would surrender to authorities but also appeal the ruling. He also denounced the MAS, claiming his sentencing was an attempt to remove him from the race and saying that "I have been sentenced to two years for serving as a deputy, for doing oversight, for denouncing corruption."

Running for reelection and polling fourth place nationally was Félix Patzi, the incumbent governor and leader of the Third System Movement (Movimiento Tercer Sistema, MTS). On 17 February, his party sued Santos Quispe, demanding that he be disqualified from running for governor as he had not yet announced his resignation as an official of the Departmental Health Service. However, on 1 March the Departmental Electoral Tribunal of La Paz dismissed the lawsuit as unfounded, allowing Quispe to continue in the race. The MTS appealed the decision to the Supreme Electoral Tribunal the following day. That same day, Patzi asserted that his party was suffering due to "false polls and by physical and political violence and mistreatment", claiming that the polling firm Ciesmori was "directing the vote" and that MAS leader Evo Morales was responsible for threats of violence against MTS candidates.

While the death of Felipe Quispe allowed the MAS candidates Franklin Flores to become the leader in the polls, he would not reach a large enough share to avoid a runoff, meaning one of the "two Quispes" would likely contest the second round.

==== Second round ====
On 29 March 2021, it was announced that MTS, as well as PAN-BOL, had signed in alliance with MAS to support the candidacy of Franklin Flores in the second round. Representatives from both MTS and PAN-BOL stated that the alliance was due to policy similarities between their parties and Flores. The news of the alliance was met by surprise by sectors of MTS in Beni and Pando which "express[ed] a general discomfort." MTS representative in Pando, Juan Huanca, pointed out that the alliance between MTS and MAS in La Paz had been "misinterpret[ed] as if Félix Patzi had signed a national agreement and it is not like that." He stated that "the national leadership should have been consulted" by MTS in La Paz. For his part, Patzi addressed the alliance saying, "One of the principles of the MTS is the autonomous decision of the departments. Therefore, each region in this second round decides according to its political specificity in electoral dispute. Hence, the national leadership cannot interfere in the decision of the regions."

Days before the second round on 6 April, Rafael Quispe announced that he would not be supporting either candidate and would vote null on his ballot. Quispe explained that he was "not going to go along with Santos Quispe and even less am I going to vote for the MAS; ... Santos Quispe and Mr.Franklin Flores are from MAS and they are the same." At the same time, Quispe's Somos Pueblo alliance released a statement clarifying its determination to let voters choose for themselves in the second round. The announcement received push back from Mayor-elect Eva Copa who accused Quispe of launching a "dirty campaign" to promote the null vote in order to allow Flores to win the election.

==== Opinion polls ====
| Poll source | Date released | Franklin Flores | Santos Quispe | Rafael Quispe | Félix Patzi | Beatriz Alvarez | Franclin Gutierrez | Juan Choque | Claudia B. Terrazas | Orlando Quispe | CC Candidate (Note: Samuel Sea (Poll 1), Mateo Laura (Polls 2-4)) | Rufo Calle | Federico Zelada | Julio Tito | Santiago Quenta | Felipe Quispe | Would not vote | Undecided |
|---|---|---|---|---|---|---|---|---|---|---|---|---|---|---|---|---|---|---|
| Ciesmori | 8 March 2021 (exit poll) | 38.5% | 25.6% | 22.3% | 4.7% | 1.8% | 1.6% | 1.0% | 1.4% | 0.6% | 0.6% | 0.7% | 0.5% | 0.4% | 0.3% | – | – | – |
| Ciesmori | 7 March 2021 (exit poll) | 37.3% | 27.1% | 22.1% | 5.4% | 1.9% | 1.3% | 1.0% | 0.9% | 0.8% | 0.5% | 0.5% | 0.5% | 0.4% | 0.3% | – | – | – |
| Ciesmori | 25 February 2021 | 34.8% | 25.4% | 25% | 7.0% | 1.3% | 2.4% | 0.8% | 0.8% | 0.2% | 1.2% | 0.9% | 0.1% | 0.1% | 0% | – | – | – |
| Ciesmori | 11 February 2021 | 21.3% | 18.4% | 14.9% | 9.3% | 0.9% | 2.7% | 0.5% | 0.6% | 0.6% | 1.9% | – | 0.2% | 0.2% | 0% | – | 10.4% | 18% |
| Ciesmori | 24 January 2021 | 15.1% | – | 10.8% | 10.1% | 1.6% | 3.7% | 0.6% | 0.8% | 0.3% | 1.7% | 0% | 0% | 0% | 0.3% | 25% | 7% | – |

==== Result ====
Following a quick count by Ciesmori, results indicated that Franklin Flores and Santos Quispe would go to a second round in April. Flores declared victory stating that "The time of change has come to La Paz." Santos Quispe alleged fraud and claimed irregularities in El Alto, where his own party's candidate Eva Copa won the mayorship of that city by over 10 points. Santos Quispe ultimately won the second round by just under ten points.

Candidates for Governor of the La Paz Department:

| Candidate | Party | First round | | Second round | |
| Candidate | Party | Votes | % | Votes | % |
|---|---|---|---|---|---|
| Santos Quispe | Together for the Call of the Peoples | 392,132 | 25.18 | 831,816 | 55.23 |
| Franklin Flores | Movement for Socialism | 618,221 | 39.70 | 674,220 | 44.77 |
| Rafael Quispe | For the Common Good - We are the People (MDS) | 349,384 | 22.44 | | |
| Félix Patzi | Third System Movement | 67,948 | 4.36 | | |
| Franclin Gutierrez | Front for Victory | 23,519 | 1.51 | | |
| Beatriz Alvarez | Sovereignty and Liberty | 22,625 | 1.45 | | |
| Claudia Bravo Terrazas | National Unity Front | 21,331 | 1.37 | | |
| Juan Choque | Overcome | 16,314 | 1.05 | | |
| Rufo Calle | Christian Democratic Party | 11,033 | 0.71 | | |
| Mateo Laura | Civic Community - Autonomies for Bolivia | 8,578 | 0.55 | | |
| Julio Tito | Patriotic Social Alliance | 7,944 | 0.51 | | |
| Orlando Quispe | Bolivian National Action Party | 6,886 | 0.44 | | |
| Federico Zelada | Movement for Sovereignty | 6,269 | 0.40 | | |
| Santiago Quenta | For my La Paz, United Invincible | 5,025 | 0.32 | | |
| Total | | 1,557,209 | 100.00 | 1,506,036 | 100.00 |
| Valid votes | | 1,557,209 | 90.35 | 1,506,036 | 92.90 |
| Invalid/blank votes | | 166,386 | 9.65 | 115,092 | 7.10 |
| Total votes | | 1,723,595 | 100.00 | 1,621,128 | 100.00 |
| Registered voters/turnout | | 1,950,428 | 88.37 | 1,947,828 | 83.23 |
Source: Plurinational Electoral Organ

=== Oruro Department ===
2021 Oruro gubernatorial election
- 7 March 2021
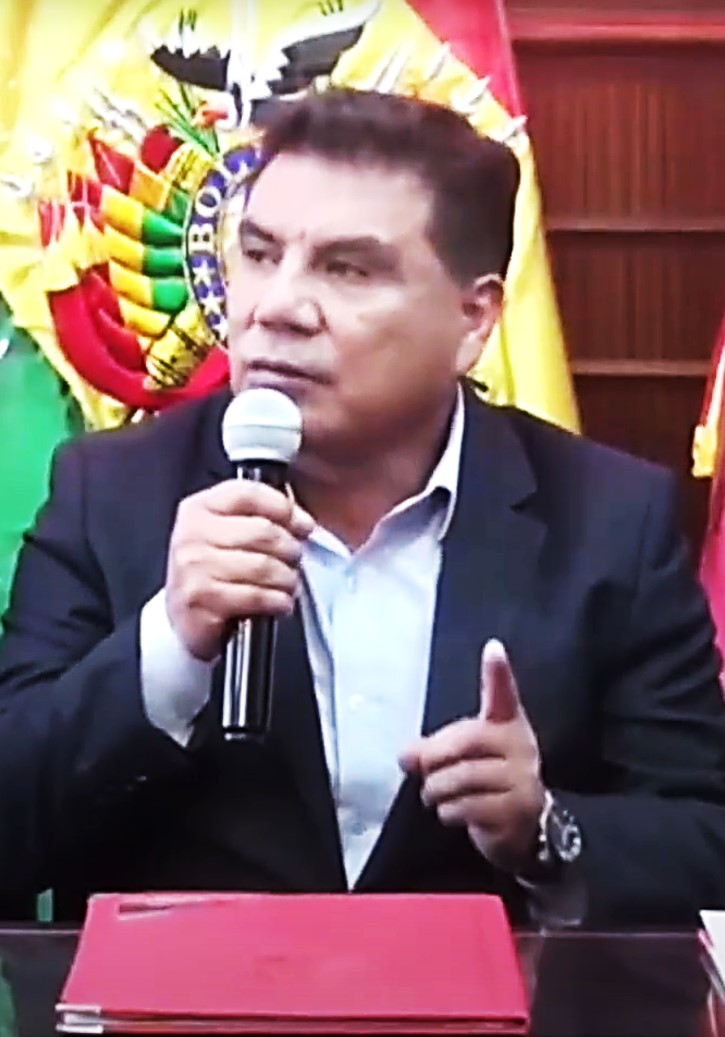

| Nominee | Johnny Franklin Vedia | Edgar Sánchez |
| Party | MAS-IPSP | BST |
| Alliance | none | Democrat Social Movement |
| Popular vote | 119,683 | 40,289 |
| Percentage | 46.31% | 15.59% |
| Nominee | Paola Pinaya | Ever Moya |
| Party | Sol Oruro | PP (Bolivia) |
| Alliance | National Unity Front | none |
| Popular vote | 39,714 | 20,964 |
| Percentage | 15.37% | 8.11% |
Governor before election
Edson Oczachoque (interim)
MAS-IPSP
Elected Governor
Johnny Franklin Vedia
MAS-IPSP

A total of eighteen political groups and alliances presented candidates for the subnational elections in the Oruro Department. Of these, eleven presented candidates for Governor of Oruro.

In Oruro, the National Unity Front aligned itself with the regional A Sun for Oruro (Un Sol Para Oruro) while the Democrat Social Movement aligned themselves with the regional group Ayni as We are All Bolivia. Its candidate Edgar Sánchez had been the MAS candidate for Governor of Oruro in 2015 but was replaced when he split from the party.

Prior to the elections, Jesús Mamani was replaced by Zenobio Calisaya as the Unity in Community for Oruro (Unidad en Comunidad Para Oruro, UNICO) party's gubernatorial candidate. Similarly, Eugenio Choque was replaced by Lidia Lino as the Bolivian National Action Party's candidate and Wilfredo Montaño was replaced by Edson Marcelo Urtado as the Christian Democratic Party's candidate.

==== Opinion polls ====
| Poll source | Date released | Johnny F. Vedia | Paola Pinaya | Edgar Sánchez | Ever Moya | UNICO Candidate (Note: Jesús Mamani (Poll 1), Zenobio Calisaya (Poll 2)) | PAN-BOL Candidate (Note: Eugenio Choque (Poll 1), Lidia Lino (Poll 2)) | Jhonny R. Ayala | Marcelo Pérez | Isar M. Cáceres | PDC Candidate (Note: Wilfredo Montaño (Poll 1), Edson Marcelo Urtado (Poll 2)) | Bryan O. Nigoevic |
|---|---|---|---|---|---|---|---|---|---|---|---|---|
| Ciesmori | 8 March 2021 (exit poll) | 42% | 16.0% | 16.8% | 7.7% | 3.7% | 2.1% | 3.3% | 2.0% | 3.4% | 1.5% | 1.5% |
| Ciesmori | 7 March 2021 (exit poll) | 39.9% | 17.2% | 13% | 8.5% | 4.4% | 4.0% | 3.8% | 3.0% | 2.8% | 2.0% | 1.4% |
| Ciesmori | 24 January 2021 | 21.2% | 10.8% | 9.6% | 9.7% | – | – | 1.9% | 1.8% | 0.8% | 0.8% | 1.6% |

==== Results ====
While Johnny Franklin Vedia of MAS did not reach 50% of the vote, he nevertheless won the election by winning over 40% with a ten point difference over the second place candidate.

Candidates for Governor of Oruro Department:

| Candidate | Party | Votes | % |
|---|---|---|---|
| Johnny Franklin Vedia | Movement for Socialism | 119,683 | 46.31 |
| Edgar Sánchez | We are all Bolivia (MDS) | 40,289 | 15.59 |
| Paola Pinaya | A Sun for Oruro (UN) | 39,714 | 15.37 |
| Ever Moya | Popular Participation | 20,964 | 8.11 |
| Isar Milton Cáceres | Third System Movement | 9,150 | 3.54 |
| Jhonny Rocha Ayala | Civic Community - Autonomies for Bolivia | 6,679 | 2.58 |
| Zenobio Calisaya | Unity in Community for Oruro | 6,336 | 2.45 |
| Lidia Lino | Bolivian National Action Party | 5,026 | 1.94 |
| Marcelo Pérez | Front for Victory | 3,608 | 1.40 |
| Bryan Oliver Nigoevic | Solidarity Civic Unity | 3,562 | 1.38 |
| Edson Marcelo Urtado | Christian Democratic Party | 3,425 | 1.33 |
| Total | | 258,436 | 100.00 |
| Valid votes | | 258,436 | 86.33 |
| Invalid/blank votes | | 40,924 | 13.67 |
| Total votes | | 299,360 | 100.00 |
| Registered voters/turnout | | 343,935 | 87.04 |
Source: Plurinational Electoral Organ

=== Pando Department ===
2021 Pando gubernatorial election
- 7 March 2021 and 11 April 2021
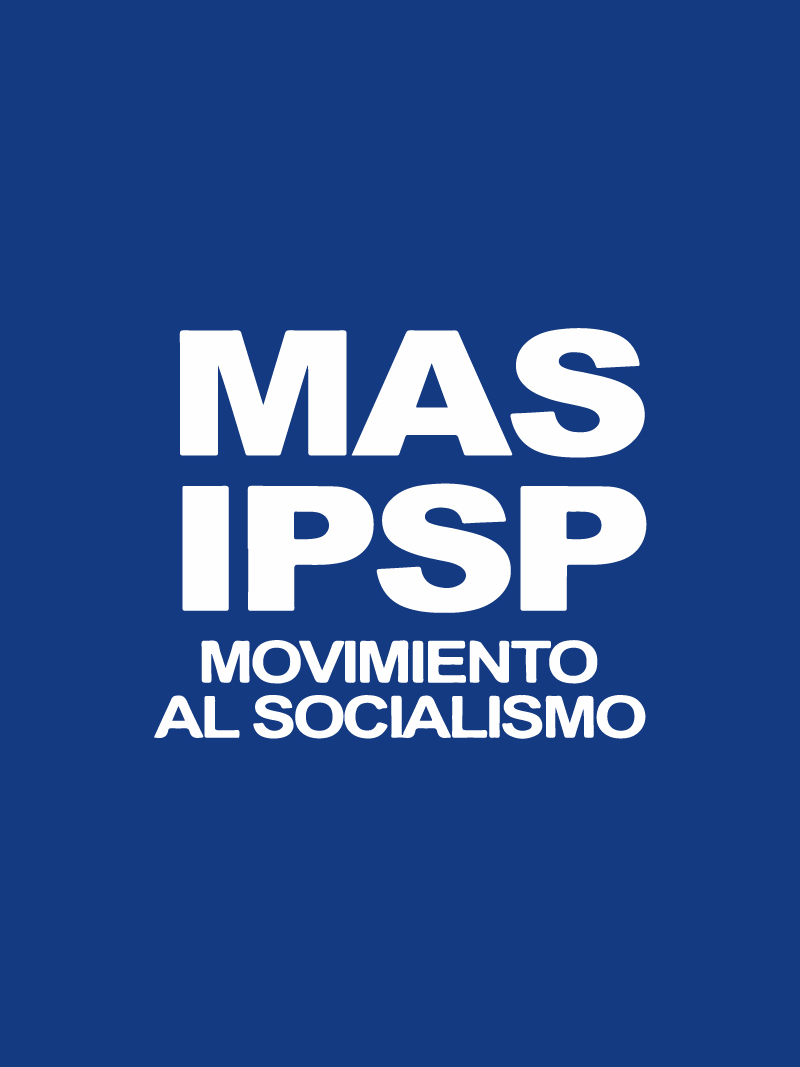

| Nominee | Regis Germán Richter | Miguel Becerra | Carmen Gonzales |
| Party | MTS (Bolivia) | MAS-IPSP | CID (Bolivia) |
| Alliance | none | none | Civic Community |
| First round | 21,069; 39.07% | 22,155; 41.08% | 7,038; 13.05% |
| Runoff | 28,856; 54.69% | 23,911; 45.31% | eliminated |
Governor before election
Paola Terrazas (interim)
MAS-IPSP
Elected Governor
Regis Germán Richter
MTS (Bolivia)

A total of nine political groups and alliances (four parties, two political alliances, and three citizens groups) presented candidates for the subnational elections in the Pando Department. Of these, six presented candidates for Governor of Pando.

Civic Community, Creemos, National Unity Front, Columna de Integración and many others forming the Democratic Integration Community (Comunidad Integración Democrática, CID). Its candidate, former senator Carmen Eva Gonzales, faced criticism for having called for the intervention of the United States in unseating the "dictatorship" of then president Evo Morales. The relatively centrist CC was also criticized for aligning itself with the far-right Gonzales for a second time, having done so once prior in the 2019 general election. Responding to similar accusations in Tarija that CC was willing to align itself with right-wing elements for political gain, Zoya Zamora Arce, the leader of CC's main component the Revolutionary Left Front, stated that "The FRI is a party that is 40 years old, it is governed by statutes and principles, it is not a party that one day leans towards one and the next day changes its mind."

For MAS, the selection of candidates was marred by another dispute relating to the registration of candidates. On 8 December 2020, Porvenir mayor Regis Germán "Papito" Richter was chosen as the party's candidate for governor. However, on 11 December Evo Morales tweeted that Miguel "Chiquitín" Becerra would be the party's candidate instead. As a result, Richter broke with MAS and presented himself as a candidate for the Third System Movement. The opposing candidates quickly became the top two most preferred candidates according to Ciesmori's polls. During the campaign, Becerra claimed that "In no way was brother Evo intervening" in choosing him as a candidate. He also stated that Richter was "a candidate from the right" because "10 years ago he supported a traditional politician in the region, Leopoldo Fernández. So, he returned to their ranks and is gaining the support of the right wing that rallied around that candidacy."

==== Opinion polls ====
| Poll source | Date released | Miguel Becerra | Regis G. Richter | Carmen Gonzales | Edgar Polanco | Benito M. Ojeda | Eliana R. de Vida |
|---|---|---|---|---|---|---|---|
| Ciesmori | 7 March 2021 (exit poll) | 40.2% | 33.5% | 13.6% | 4.3% | 4.3% | 4.1% |
| Ciesmori | 24 January 2021 | 30.9% | 26.5% | 10.6% | 4.8% | 1.5% | 2.5% |

==== Results ====
Miguel Becerra of MAS narrowly won the plurality of the vote in the first round with 41.08% against Regis Germán Richter who won 39.07%. Both advanced to the 11 April runoff. Richter prevailed over Becerra by 54.69% of the vote becoming governor-elect.

Candidates for Governor of the Pando Department:

| Candidate | Party | First round | | Second round | |
| Candidate | Party | Votes | % | Votes | % |
|---|---|---|---|---|---|
| Regis Germán Richter | Third System Movement | 21,069 | 39.07 | 28,856 | 54.69 |
| Miguel Becerra | Movement for Socialism | 22,155 | 41.08 | 23,911 | 45.31 |
| Carmen Eva Gonzales | Democratic Integration Community (CC) | 7,038 | 13.05 | | |
| Edgar Polanco | Amazonian Social Organic Power | 2,025 | 3.76 | | |
| Eliana Rina Acosta de Vida | Amazonian Democratic Vision | 994 | 1.84 | | |
| Benito Mamani Ojeda | We Are All Pando | 647 | 1.20 | | |
| Total | | 53,928 | 100.00 | 52,767 | 100.00 |
| Valid votes | | 53,928 | 90.71 | 52,767 | 95.60 |
| Invalid/blank votes | | 5,522 | 9.29 | 2,431 | 4.40 |
| Total votes | | 59,450 | 100.00 | 55,198 | 100.00 |
| Registered voters/turnout | | 73,221 | 81.19 | 73,029 | 75.58 |
Source: Plurinational Electoral Organ

=== Potosí Department ===
2021 Potosí gubernatorial election
- 7 March 2021
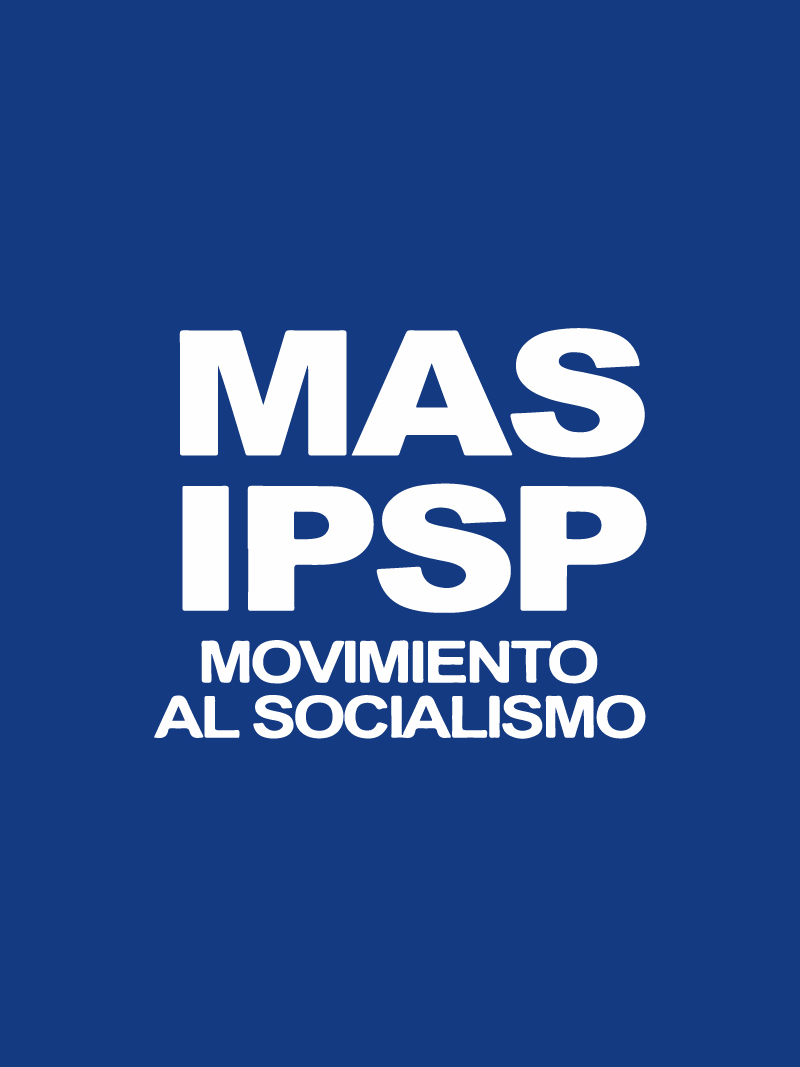

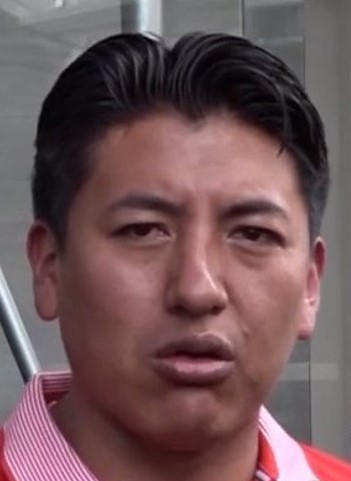

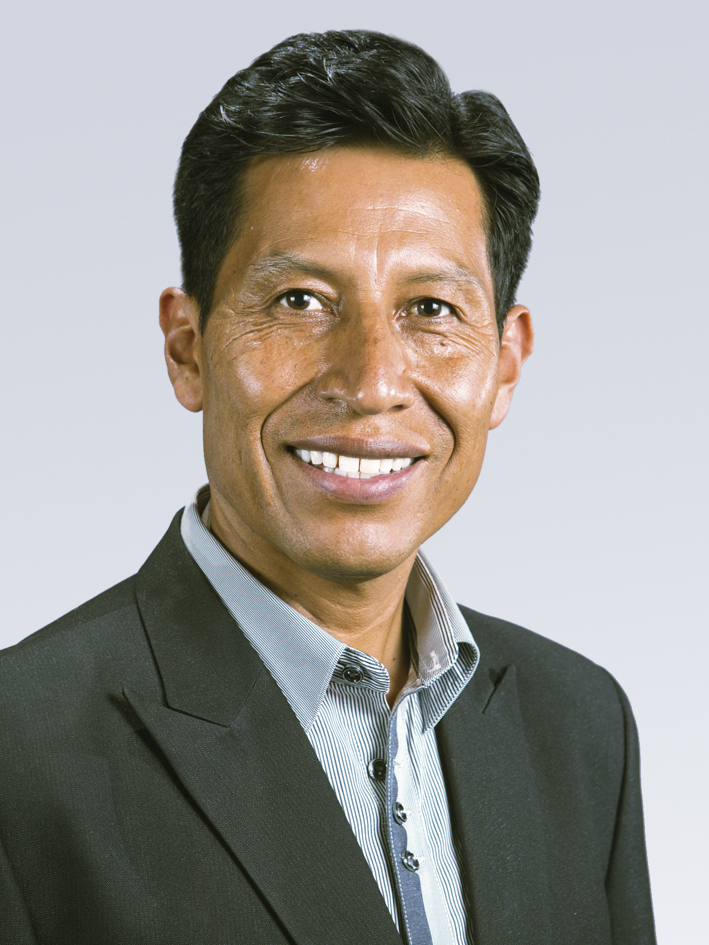
| Nominee | Jhonny Mamani | Marco Pumari |
| Party | MAS-IPSP | PAN-BOL |
| Popular vote | 140,275 | 70,981 |
| Percentage | 44.05% | 22.29% |
| Nominee | Ediberto Chambi | Edwin Rodríguez |
| Party | AS (Bolivia) | MOP (Bolivia) |
| Popular vote | 50,987 | 20,602 |
| Percentage | 16.01% | 6.47% |
Governor before election
Eloy Calizaya (interim)
MAS-IPSP
Elected Governor
Jhonny Mamani
MAS-IPSP

A total of twenty political groups and alliances presented candidates for the subnational elections in the Potosí Department. Of these, ten presented candidates for Governor of Potosí.

On 10 December 2020, MAS leader Evo Morales proclaimed former Tawa mayor Jhonny Mamani had been elected as the party's candidate for governor on a secret ballot. This was met with dissatisfaction from peasant sectors of MAS, leading to new elections to be held in Betanzos where Ediberto Chambi was chosen as the party's candidate. However, that decision was overruled and Mamani was registered as the MAS candidate on 28 December, though not before supporters of Chambi blocked access to the Departmental Electoral Tribunal. Following this, Chambi registered as the gubernatorial candidate for the Social Alliance (Alianza Social, AS).

Mamani's main contender was the civic leader Marco Pumari of PAN-BOL. He had been the running mate of Luis Fernando Camacho in the 2020 general election. Following that election, Pumari broke with Camacho, stating that "Creemos had an expiration date, the term of the alliances was up to the 18th of October" and further elaborating that he had not had contact with Camacho since the date of the election and that a new national strategy was necessary for the subnational elections.

On 24 February, Milton Navarro, Minister of Sports of Jeanine Áñez administration and member of Nationalist Democratic Action announced his party's intent to withdraw from the Potosí elections so as to now split the vote between too many candidates. The ADN then endorsed Pumari and PAN-BOL. Despite the stated intention of not splitting the vote, the Departmental Electoral Tribunal of Potosí only made the ADN's withdrawal official on 7 March, the morning of the elections. The late decision on whether ADN was still in the race meant that any votes for ADN candidates became null votes.

Prior to the elections, Limber Choque was replaced by Freddy Rioja as the Front for Victory's gubernatorial candidate.

==== Opinion polls ====
| Poll source | Date released | Jhonny Mamani | Marco Pumari | Ediberto Chambi | Edwin Rodríguez | Miguel Garnica | Félix Santos | Félix Vásquez | Walter Galván | FPV Candidate (Note: Limber Choque (Poll 1), Freddy Rioja (Poll 2)) | Milton Navarro |
|---|---|---|---|---|---|---|---|---|---|---|---|
| Ciesmori | 7 March 2021 (exit poll) | 41.6% | 17% | 15.6% | 8.9% | 4.6% | 4.5% | 3.2% | 2.6% | 2.0% | – |
| Ciesmori | 24 January 2021 | 27.5% | 19.5% | 7.7% | 2.5% | 1.8% | 1.5% | 0.8% | 0.7% | 0.6% | 1.0% |

==== Results ====
As a result of the divided opposition field, Jhonny Mamani won in the first round with 41.16%, winning over 40% with a ten point difference over the second place candidate.

Candidates for Governor of the Potosí Department:

| Candidate | Party | Votes | % |
|---|---|---|---|
| Jhonny Mamani | Movement for Socialism | 140,275 | 44.05 |
| Marco Pumari | Bolivian National Action Party | 70,981 | 22.29 |
| Ediberto Chambi | Social Alliance | 50,987 | 16.01 |
| Edwin Rodríguez | Popular Organization Movement | 20,602 | 6.47 |
| Félix Santos | Puka Sunqu | 12,324 | 3.87 |
| Walter Galván | Democrat Social Movement | 8,396 | 2.64 |
| Miguel Garnica | Civic Community - Autonomies for Bolivia | 6,994 | 2.20 |
| Félix Vásquez | Third System Movement | 6,247 | 1.96 |
| Freddy Rioja | Front for Victory | 1,662 | 0.52 |
| Milton Navarro (Note: Withdrew on 24 February but only disqualified by the Departmental Electoral Tribunal on 7 March.) | Nationalist Democratic Action | 0 | 0.00 |
| Total | | 318,468 | 100.00 |
| Valid votes | | 318,468 | 81.88 |
| Invalid/blank votes | | 70,482 | 18.12 |
| Total votes | | 388,950 | 100.00 |
| Registered voters/turnout | | 465,267 | 83.60 |
Source: Plurinational Electoral Organ

=== Santa Cruz Department ===
2021 Santa Cruz gubernatorial election
- 7 March 2021
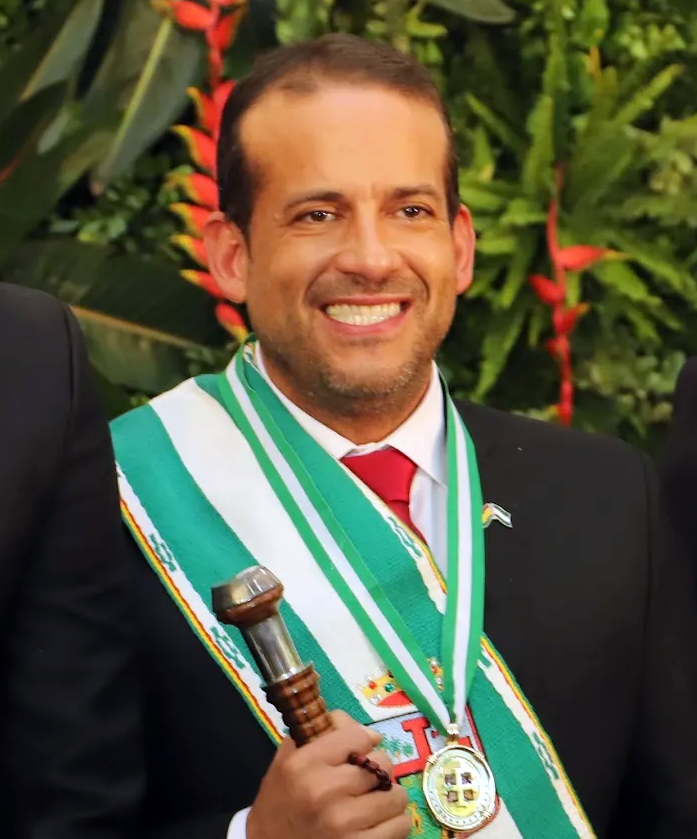

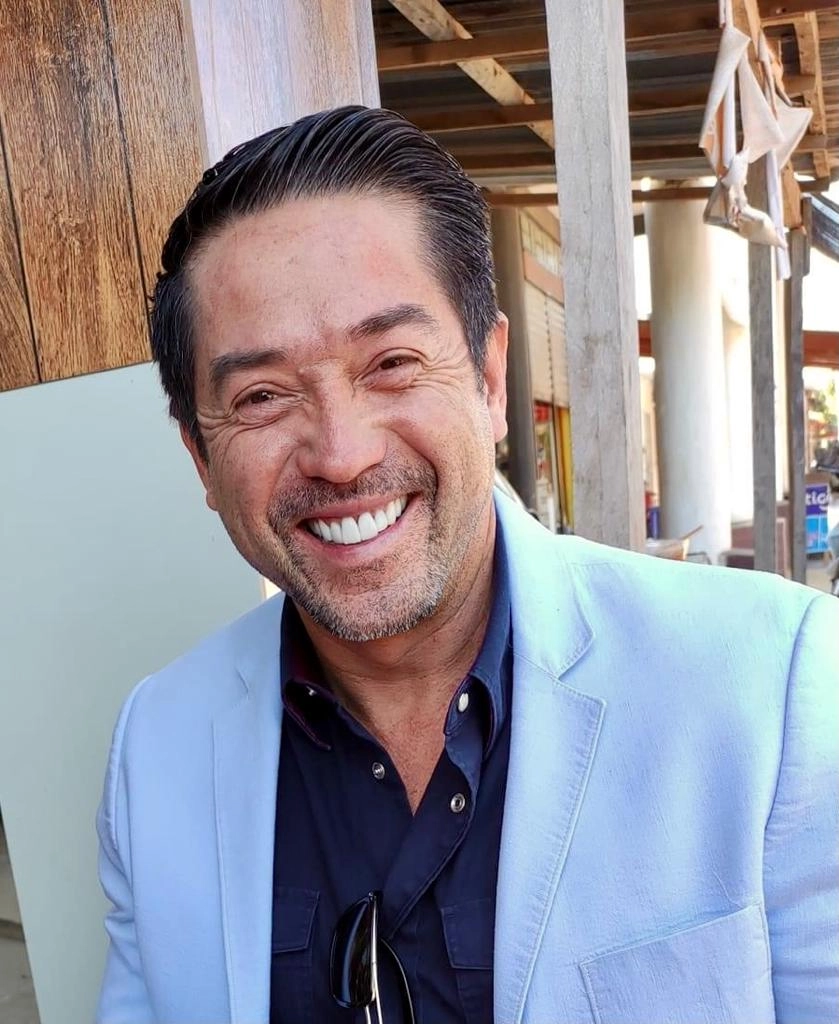
| Nominee | Luis Fernando Camacho | Mario Cronenbold |
| Party | Creemos | MAS-IPSP |
| Alliance | List: Democrat Social Movement Christian Democratic Party New Citizen Power Autonomy for Bolivia Bolivian National Action Party Santa Cruz for Everyone | none |
| Popular vote | 860,023 | 589,978 |
| Percentage | 55.64% | 38.17% |
Governor before election
Rubén Costas
MDS
Elected Governor
Luis Fernando Camacho
Creemos

A total of thirty-four political groups and alliances presented candidates for the subnational elections in the Santa Cruz Department. Of these, eight presented candidates for Governor of Santa Cruz.

Party meetings regarding the nomination of a MAS candidate for Governor of Santa Cruz were met with controversy, especially in relation to the continued interference of MAS leader and former president Evo Morales in the choosing of candidates. The popular former mayor of Warnes Mario Cronenbold was initially the favorite to win the party's nomination and enjoyed the personal endorsement of Morales. However, Morales' support for Cronenbold was lost when he made statements in opposition to prosecuting Creemos leader Luis Fernando Camacho for his actions during the 2019 political crisis.

On 14 December, at a meeting in Shinaota, Cochabamba, Morales appointed his former minister of government Carlos Romero as the party's candidate in Santa Cruz. The departure from Cronenbold angered the meetings participants. Amid shouts of "renovation", one person threw a plastic chair at Morales, hitting him in the head. The event was dubbed the silletazo and was the source of much controversy amongst all sectors of the country. Half an hour after the conflict, Romero was withdrawn and the television presenter Pedro García was brought forth as a compromise candidate. García's candidacy was also rejected with Cronenbold expressing his anger that a candidate for Santa Cruz had been chosen in another department. At the headquarters of the Federation of Peasants on 15 December, grassroots organizations of MAS members ratified Cronenbold as their candidate, rejecting García.

Regardless, the clear front runner in the gubernatorial election was Luis Fernando Camacho, a political activist who contended the 2020 general election as part of the Creemos alliance which he led, winning 14% of the national vote and the Santa Cruz Department. Camacho's Santa Cruz gubernatorial bid was supported by an alliance of New Citizen Power (Nuevo Poder Ciudadano, NPC), Autonomy for Bolivia (Autonomía Para Bolivia, APB), Santa Cruz for Everyone (Santa Cruz Para Todos, SPT), the Christian Democratic Party, the Bolivian National Action Party and the Democrat Social Movement of incumbent governor Rubén Costas who was term-limited. Ciesmori's third opinion poll gave Camacho a 54% margin of victory, implying he could win outright without requiring a runoff. Political analyst José Orlando Peralta asserted that this was due to the fact that Camacho had the concentration of the "anti-MAS" vote.

Some former allies of Creemos were also Camacho's rivals. Germaín Caballero Vargas, mayor of San José de Chiquitos and former Creemos spokesman ran for Governor with UNIDOS, as well as Luis Felipe Dorado, candidate for Senator in 2020 election, ran with SOL.

On 18 February, Víctor Ferrada was announced as the new candidate for the Front for Victory. This came after the previous candidate Roger Martínez Becerra was disqualified twice, the second time he did not appeal and withdrew as a candidate.

On 26 January, Former Attorney General José María Cabrera of Strength and Hope withdrew as a candidate.

==== Opinion polls ====
| Poll source | Date released | Luis F. Camacho | Mario Cronenbold | Germaín Caballero | Luís F. Dorado | Chi Hyun Chung | Braulio Espinoza | FPV Candidate (Note: Roger M. Becerra (Polls 1-3) Víctor Ferrada (Poll 4)) | José María Cabrera | Would not vote | Undecided |
|---|---|---|---|---|---|---|---|---|---|---|---|
| Ciesmori | 8 March 2021 (exit poll) | 55.1% | 37.8% | 3.7% | 1.4% | 1.1% | 0.7% | 0.2% | – | – | – |
| Ciesmori | 7 March 2021 (exit poll) | 55.4% | 34.3% | 5.1% | 1.9% | 1.7% | 1.2% | 0.4% | – | – | – |
| Ciesmori | 11 February 2021 | 54.43% | 36.3% | 5.6% | 0.9% | 1.7% | 0.3% | 0.4% | 0.1% | – | – |
| Ciesmori | 11 February 2021 | 42.2% | 28% | 4.3% | 0.7% | 1.3% | 0.2% | 0.3% | 0.1% | 6.2% | 16.7% |
| Ciesmori | 24 January 2021 | 34.43% | 31.8% | 7.4% | 1.4% | 2.9% | 0.6% | 0.3% | 0.5% | – | – |

==== Results ====
Exit polls gave Luis Fernando Camacho a victory of over 55% allowing him to win in the first round. Declaring victory, Camacho stated that "Santa Cruz will never belong to the MAS," a comment Mario Cronenbold responded to, saying that "at the end of the day the masistas are also from Santa Cruz," and having a different political ideology "does not make them any less from Santa Cruz." Though Cronenbold indicated that his party's strength in Yapacaní and San Julián could "add about 6 more points" and close the gap for a runoff, that ultimately did not happen.

In seven municipalities; Colpa Bélgica, San Ramón, San José de Chiquitos, and Pailón, as well as in four precincts in Santa Cruz de la Sierra, three in Warnes, and one in El Torno, the election was redone on 21 March. This, due to acts of violence and the burning of ballots by residents alleging irregularities in the 7 March election.

Candidates for Governor of the Santa Cruz Department:

| Candidate | Party | Votes | % |
|---|---|---|---|
| Luis Fernando Camacho | Creemos | 860,023 | 55.64 |
| Mario Cronenbold | Movement for Socialism | 589,978 | 38.17 |
| Germaín Caballero | Union Democracy and Social Opportunity | 50,315 | 3.26 |
| Luís Felipe Dorado | Security, Order and Liberty | 20,850 | 1.35 |
| Chi Hyun Chung | Popular Solidarity Alliance | 17,530 | 1.13 |
| Braulio Espinoza | Revolutionary Nationalist Movement | 6,962 | 0.45 |
| Víctor Ferrada | Front for Victory | 0 | 0.00 |
| Total | | 1,545,658 | 100.00 |
| Valid votes | | 1,545,658 | 94.17 |
| Invalid/blank votes | | 95,644 | 5.83 |
| Total votes | | 1,641,302 | 100.00 |
| Registered voters/turnout | | 1,914,621 | 85.72 |
Source: Plurinational Electoral Organ

=== Tarija Department ===
2021 Tarija gubernatorial election
- 7 March 2021 (first round) and 11 April 2021 (runoff)
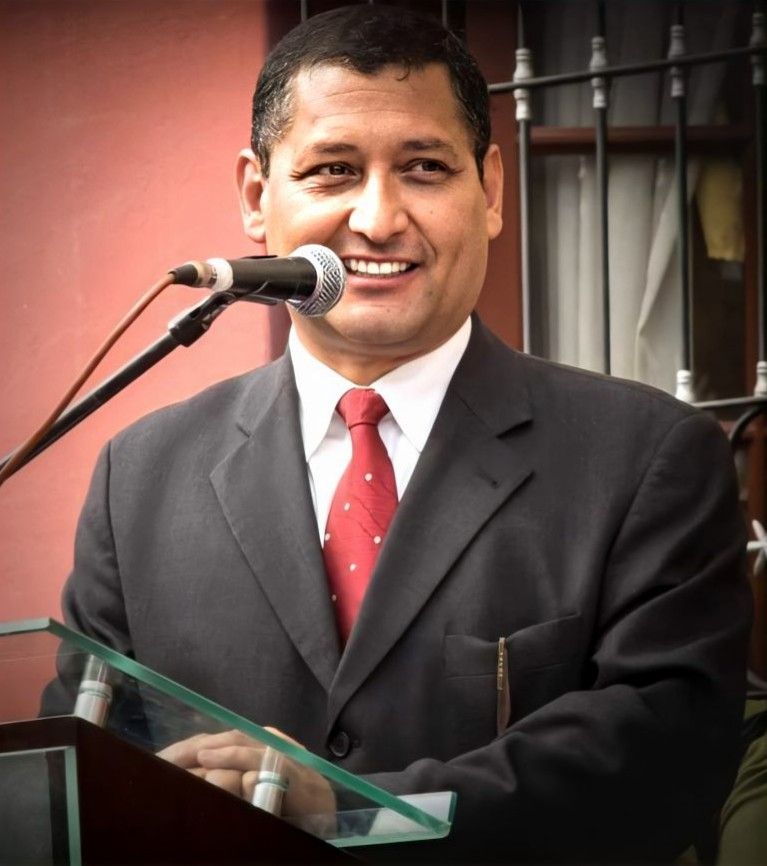

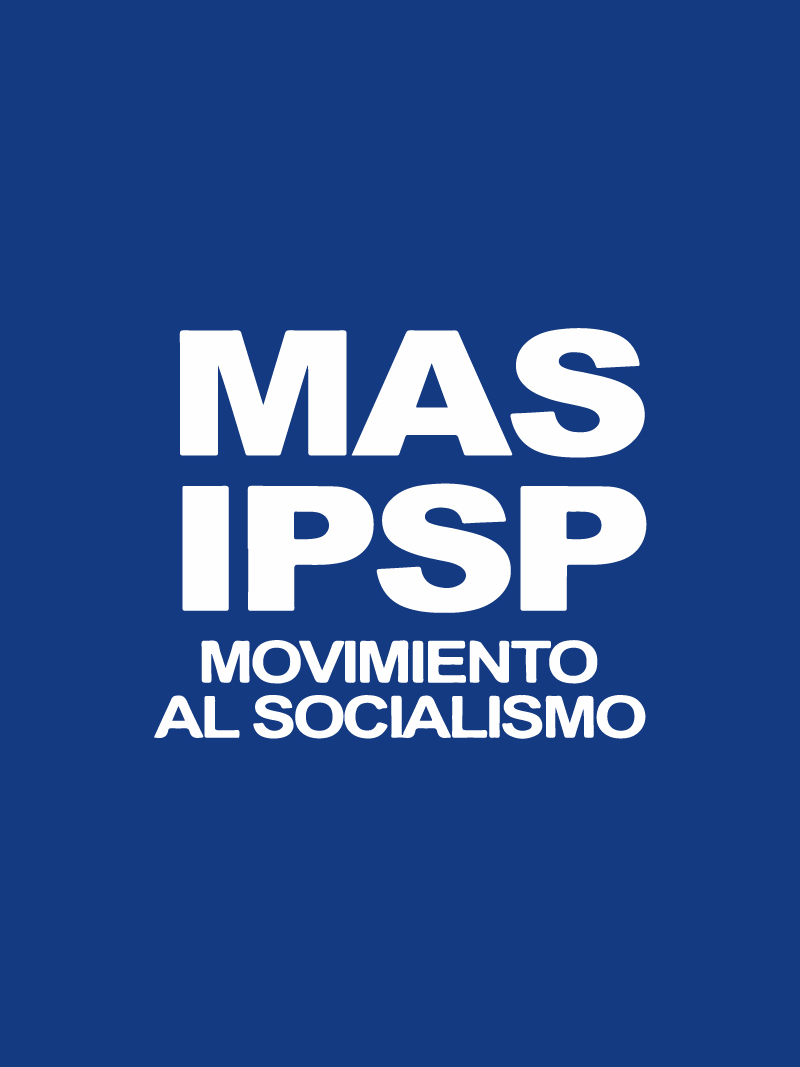

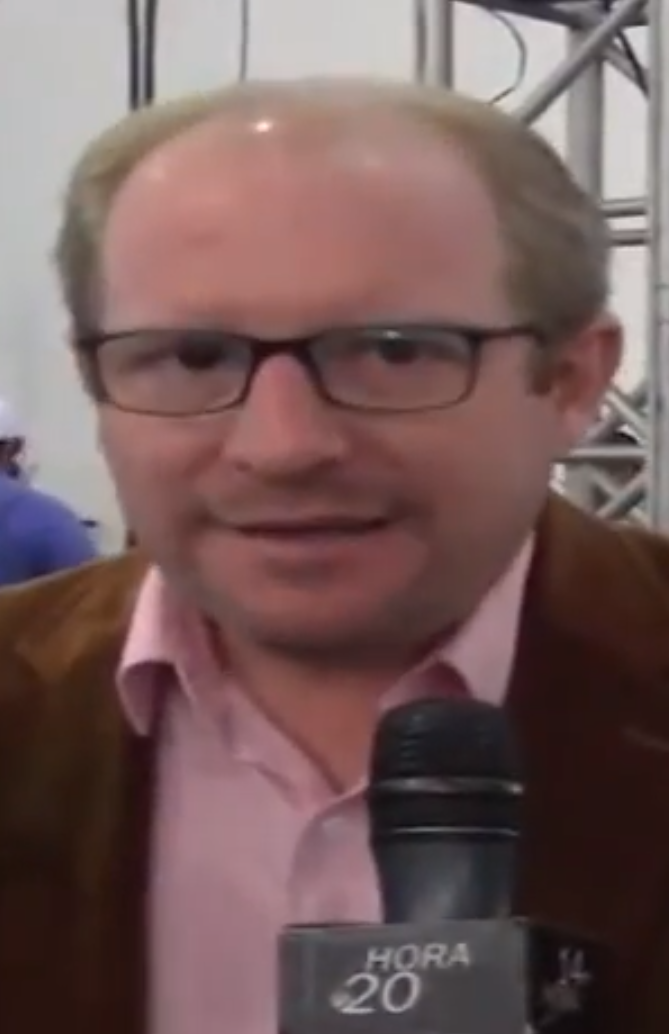
| Nominee | Oscar Montes | Álvaro Ruiz | Adrián Oliva |
| Party | UNIDOS (Note: Coalition consisting of UN, UNIR, MNR, CDC, and PRP) | MAS-IPSP | [[Community of Everyone (Note: Coalition consisting of CC and Sol.Bo)|Community of Everyone (Note: Coalition consisting of CC and Sol.Bo)]] |
| Alliance | National Unity Front | none | Civic Community |
| First round | 111,033; 38.05% | 111,391; 38.17% | 52,684; 18.05% |
| Runoff | 159,754; 54.44% | 133,719; 45.56% | eliminated |
Governor before election
Adrián Oliva
Community of Everyone
Elected Governor
Oscar Montes
UNIDOS

A total of ten political groups and alliances presented candidates for the subnational elections in the Tarija Department. Of these, seven presented candidates for Governor of Tarija.

Incumbent Governor Adrián Oliva had been allied with the national Civic Community since 15 November 2018. Aside from the FRI, the secondary component of CC was First the People (Primero la Gente, PG), a Tarija-based group. Oliva and CC ran under the Community of Everyone (Comunidad de Todos) alliance consisting of CC (FRI and PG), as well as Sovereignty and Liberty (Soberanía y Libertad, Sol.Bo).

The National Unity Front formed the United for Change (Unidos por el Cambio, UNIDOS) alliance made up of various groups including the Revolutionary Nationalist Movement, Democratic Way to Change (Camino Democrático al Cambio) of former Prefect Mario Cossío, Homeland Renovation and Progress (Patria Renovación y Progreso, PRP), and United to Renew (Unidos Para Renovar, UNIR) of Oscar Montes who was presented as the front's gubernatorial candidate.

Montes faced some controversy when the Movement for Socialism candidate Álvaro Ruiz stated in an interview that Montes had been "One of the main allies that the Movement for Socialism has had during the 14 years [of Evo Morales' government]." He nevertheless led in that month's Ciesmori poll over Oliva.

On 24 February, Governor Oliva denounced the issuance of an arrest warrant against him and the fact that had only learned of it "from third parties". The charges were related to a 2016 investigation regarding a complaint by a construction company that was supervising the construction of the maternity hospital. Criminal charges had been filed in 2017. On 6 March, a day before voting began, it was announced that Oliva had tested positive for COVID-19.

==== Opinion polls ====
| Poll source | Date released | Oscar Montes | Álvaro Ruiz | Adrián Oliva | Luis Alfaro | Mirtha Arce | Alfredo Colque | Wilfredo Barrios |
|---|---|---|---|---|---|---|---|---|
| Ciesmori | 8 March 2021 (exit poll) | 39.4% | 37.1% | 17.6% | 2.4% | 2.2% | 0.8% | 0.5% |
| Ciesmori | 7 March 2021 (exit poll) | 37.7% | 36.1% | 20.5% | 3.5% | 1.4% | 0.4% | 0.4% |
| Ciesmori | 24 January 2021 | 34.7% | 16% | 25.7% | 1.4% | 2.3% | – | – |

==== Results ====
In the first round, Álvaro Ruiz of MAS gained first place over Oscar Montes of UNIDOS by a difference of just 358 votes. Both candidates moved on to the 11 April runoff. Incumbent governor Adrián Oliva won 18.05% of the vote, losing reelection. In the runoff, Montes' victory was the first of the four runoffs to be made official when 100% of the results showed him with a victory over Ruiz of just under nine points. Montes declared victory on 11 April and Ruiz conceded the election the following day.

Candidates for Governor of the Tarija Department:

| Candidate | Party | First round | | Second round | |
| Candidate | Party | Votes | % | Votes | % |
|---|---|---|---|---|---|
| Oscar Montes | United for Change (UN) | 111,033 | 38.05 | 159,754 | 54.44 |
| Álvaro Ruiz | Movement for Socialism | 111,391 | 38.17 | 133,719 | 45.56 |
| Adrián Oliva | Community of Everyone (CC) | 52,684 | 18.05 | | |
| Mirtha Arce | Integral Security Autonomy | 6,636 | 2.27 | | |
| Luis Alfaro | Third System Movement | 5,637 | 1.93 | | |
| Alfredo Colque | Tarija for Everyone | 2,780 | 0.95 | | |
| Wilfredo Barrios | Front for Victory | 1,654 | 0.57 | | |
| Total | | 291,815 | 100.00 | 293,473 | 100.00 |
| Valid votes | | 291,815 | 91.54 | 293,473 | 95.23 |
| Invalid/blank votes | | 26,985 | 8.46 | 14,693 | 4.77 |
| Total votes | | 318,800 | 100.00 | 308,166 | 100.00 |
| Registered voters/turnout | | 381,025 | 83.67 | 380,395 | 81.01 |
Source: Plurinational Electoral Organ
