= We Are All Bolivia =

Political party in Bolivia

We Are All Bolivia (Spanish: Bolivia Somos Todos; BST) is a national political party in Bolivia that intends to contest the 2019 national and 2020 regional elections. The party was founded in Sucre in April 2016, by Damián Condori, Román Loayza, Rebeca Delgado, Luis Alfaro, and Félix Santos, all of whom are dissident former members of the governing Movement for Socialism. Condori had been a candidate for governor of Chuquisaca Department in 2015 on the We Are All Chuquisaca ballot line, but the parties that formed that line are not affiliated with We Are All Bolivia.

The party's National Executive Committee consists of Edgar Sánchez (of Oruro), Damián Condori (of Chuquisaca), and Rene Rodriguez (of Montero, Santa Cruz).

The party describes itself as committed to full democracy, autonomy, human rights, and a Bolivia free of discrimination. BST and Sovereignty and Freedom (SOL.bo) agreed to an alliance in July 2016. It held its first ordinary congress in December 2016 in Sucre. An attempt to hold a national congress in Millares, Potosí, in late July 2017 was frustrated by the opposition of local officials. BST leaders claimed that they were detained by these local leaders and advised not to have the meeting.
