= San Pedro, Beni =

Coordinates: 14.3372°S 64.9019°W

San Pedro (Beni)
- Town
- Interactive map of San Pedro (Beni)
- Country: Bolivia
- Time zone: UTC-4 (BOT)

San Pedro (Beni) is a small town in Bolivia.
