= Puerto Siles =

- Town
- Location of Puerto Siles town in Bolivia
- Coordinates: 12°48′S 65°5′W
- Country: Bolivia
- Department: Beni Department
- Province: Mamoré Province
- Time zone: UTC-4 (BOT)

Puerto Siles is a town in the Mamoré Province in the Beni Department of northern Bolivia. It is the capital of the Puerto Siles Municipality.

It is located around a lake.
