= Mamoré Province =

Coordinates: 13°10′01″S 64°40′01″W

Mamoré
- Province
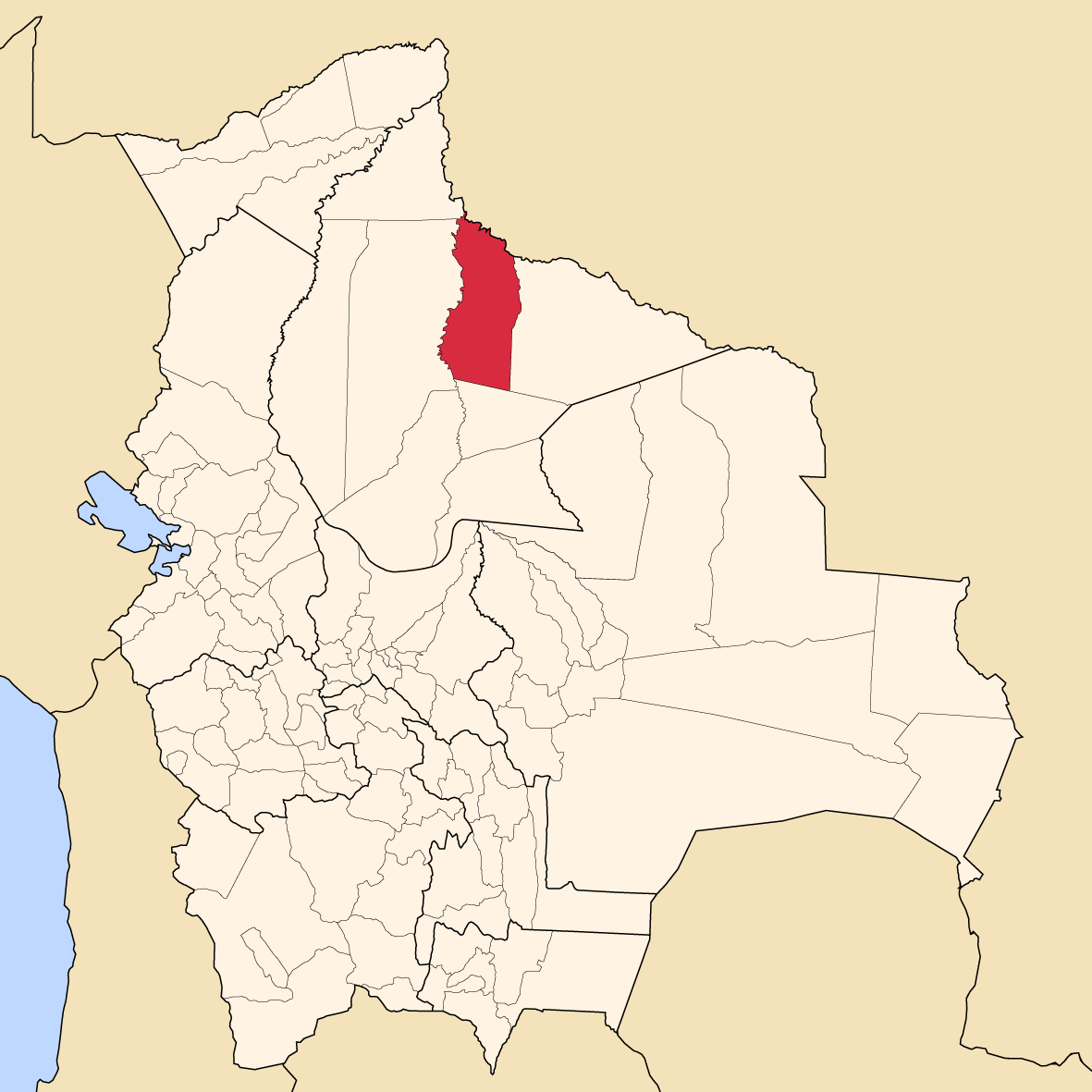
- Map of Bolivia highlighting the province of José Ballivián.

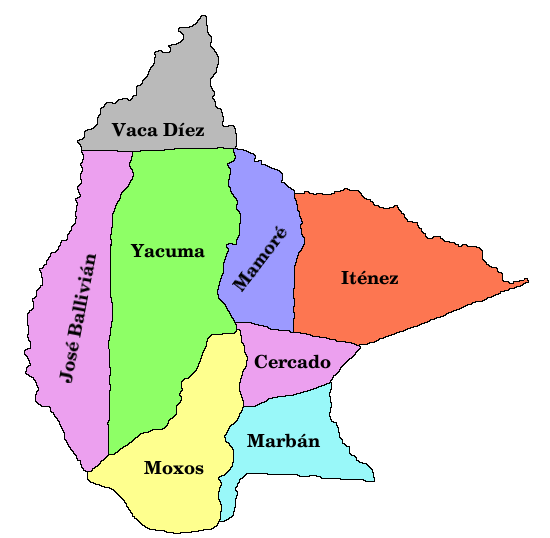
- Provinces of the Beni Department
- Country: Bolivia
- Department: Beni
- Seat: San Joaquín
- Settlements: Municipalities: San Joaquín; San Ramón; Puerto Siles

Area
  - Total: 7,222 sq mi (18,706 km^{2})

Population (2024 census)
  - Total: 13,387
  - Density: 1.8535/sq mi (0.71565/km^{2})
- Time zone: UTC-4 (BOT)

Mamoré is a province in the Beni Department, Bolivia. Its towns include San Ignacio, Mamoré.

== Name ==
The province got its name from the Moré language.
