= Iris Flores =

Bolivian politician

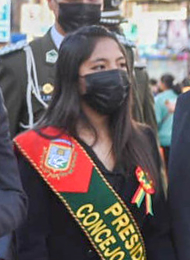

President of the El Alto Municipal Council
- In office 4 May 2021 – 4 May 2022
- Mayor: Eva Copa
- Vice President: Daniel Ramos
- Preceded by: Antioco Cala
- Succeeded by: Rogelio Maldonado

Personal details
- Born: Iris Alexsandra Flores Quispe; 29 August 2000 (age 26) El Alto, La Paz, Bolivia
- Party: Jallalla La Paz (Note: Flores pertains to a majority faction of Jallalla aligned with Mayor Eva Copa, referring to themselves as the Renueva caucus.)
- Education: Public University of El Alto

Iris Alexsandra Flores Quispe (born 29 August 2000) is a Bolivian politician and university student who served as president of the El Alto Municipal Council from 2021 to 2022. A member of Jallalla La Paz, she gained notoriety for being among the youngest authorities in the country, assuming the presidency of Bolivia's second most populous municipality at just twenty years of age.

== Early life and education ==
Iris Flores was born on 29 August 2000 in El Alto, La Paz. A lifelong resident of the city, in 2019, she entered the Public University of El Alto (UPEA) seeking a degree in education sciences. While still a student, in 2021, she was nominated by the Jallalla La Paz civic group as a candidate for councillor for El Alto in order to serve as a representative for the UPEA on the city's Municipal Council. Her candidacy was facilitated by Eva Copa, Jallalla's mayoral candidate, as part of her initiative of prioritizing the political empowerment of women and the inclusion of young professionals in politics.

== El Alto Municipal councillor ==
On 4 May 2021, by a vote of seven to three, Flores was elected president of the El Alto Municipal Council, assuming the second-highest position in Bolivia's second most populous city at just twenty years of age. In her first interview with the press, Flores thanked her fellow councillors for their "vote of confidence in me" and stated that she felt "lucky to represent the youth of my city". She went on to highlight improving education and tackling the health crisis as the council's immediate priorities.

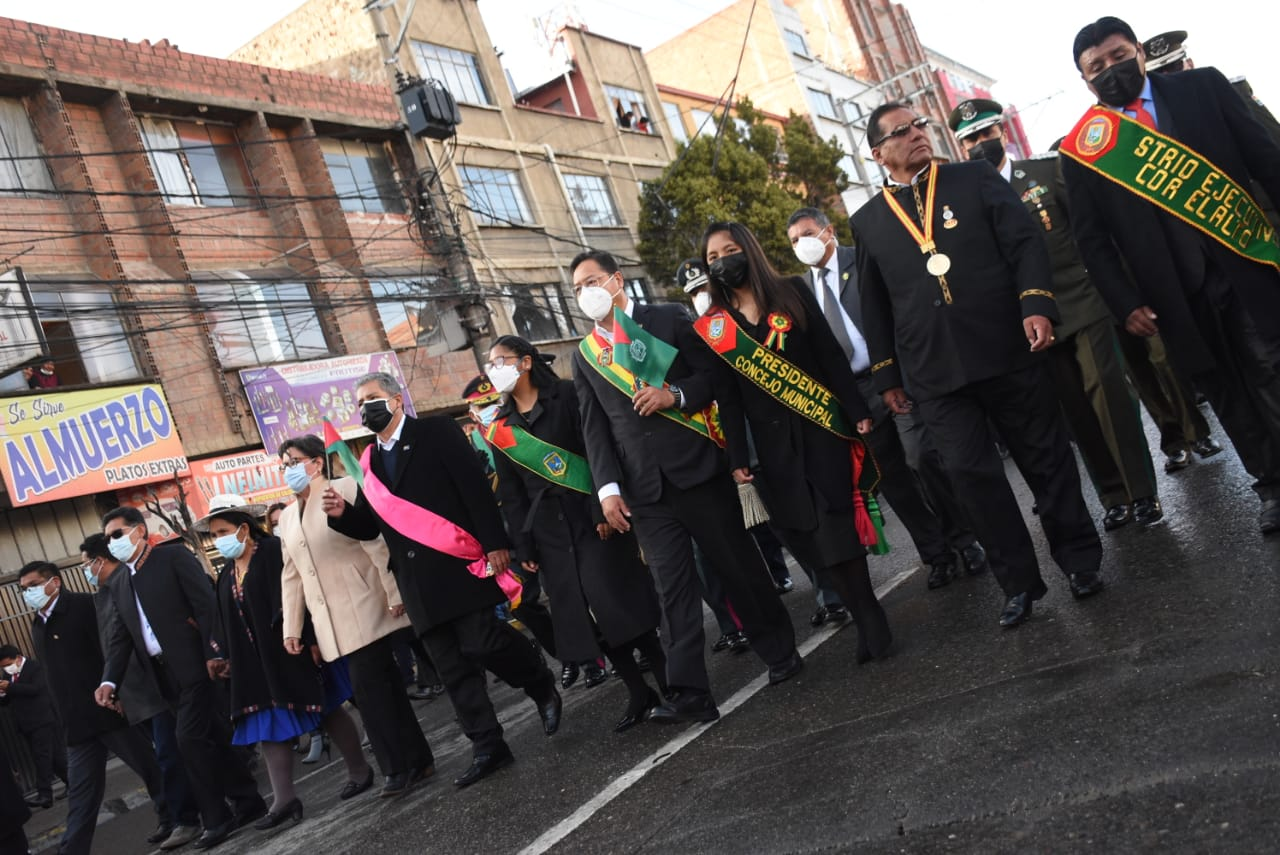
Flores at the civic parade for the 37th anniversary of El Alto, 4 March 2022.

Though her election was generally met with positive reception, Flores' lack of professional or even academic credentials was a topic of some controversy. In the first few days of her term, allegations that her election to the presidency of the council was only due to being Copa's niece circulated on social networks, though the mayor later denied any familial connection between the two. Copa went on articulate that Flores deserved to be "give[n] the benefit of the doubt" and condemned those trying to "defame" her. Despite the lack of a familial relationship, Flores nonetheless remained a staunch ally of Copa and, when the latter was expelled from Jallalla, she was among the six of eight Jallalla councillors who maintained their support for the mayor, forming the so-called "RenuEva" bloc in the Municipal Council.

Per Article 21 Section II of the municipal council's regulations, the council directive is renewed on a yearly basis, with the presidency and secretariat corresponding to the majority party while the vice presidency corresponds to the minority. Upon the completion of Flores' term, the Renueva caucus evaluated whether or not to ratify her in her position or elect a new authority. Ultimately, the majority bloc decided that Flores would not be maintained in office, with Councillor Rogelio Maldonado being designated to succeed her. On 4 May 2022, in her final act as president, Flores convened the session in which the new directive of the municipal council was to be elected. Per a report by El Alteño, Flores "showed some nervousness and did not command the session with skill [or] dexterity", lending a sense that "something was wrong" among the social leaders in attendance. Upon its installment, the opposition nominated Víctor Contreras—one of the two anti-Copa Jallalla councillors—to preside over the council, while the Renueva bloc presented Maldonado. In an unexpected turn of events, Contreras was elected by a six vote majority—including his own—having attained the support of the minority Movement for Socialism, the other anti-Copa Jallalla councillor, as well as Cristian Estévez, until then aligned with the Renueva caucus.

The coup de grâce drew the ire of the social leaders attending the event. Amid protests and accusations of "fraud", Flores was forced to suspend the session, thus preventing Contreras from being sworn in. The unrest quickly erupted into violence, with opposing sides coming to blows. The chaos forced a police contingent to restrict access to the theater in which the election was being held; even Contreras and Estévez were not allowed back in because they did not have their credentials on hand. Within the theater, Flores reconvened the session despite the presence of just six of the eleven councillors. This time, Maldonado was elected, with Flores swearing in the new directive on the spot, thus bringing her term to a definitive end.

== Electoral history ==
Year	Office	Party	Votes			Result	Ref.
Year	Office	Party	Total	%	P.	Result	Ref.
2021	Councillor	Jallalla La Paz	251,676	59.14%	1st (Note: Presented on an electoral list. The data shown represents the share of the vote the entire party/alliance received in that constituency.)	Won	
Source: Plurinational Electoral Organ | Electoral Atlas

Civic offices
Preceded by Antioco Cala	President of the El Alto Municipal Council; 2021–present	Succeeded by Rogelio Maldonado
