= 2021 Public University of El Alto railings collapse =

2021 University of El Alto railings collapse
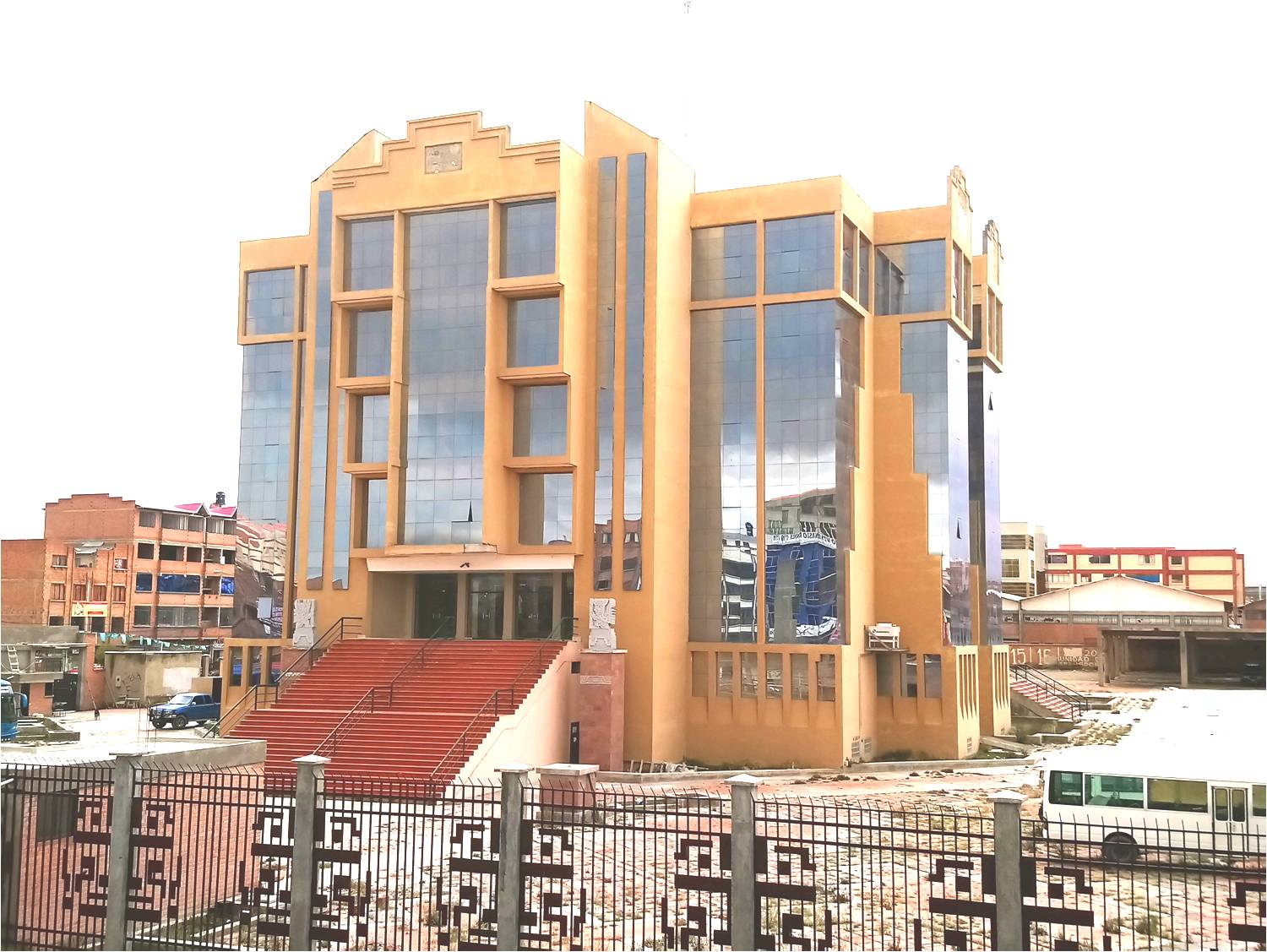
- Date: 2 March 2021
- Location: Public University of El Alto
- Type: Structural collapse
- Cause: Overcrowding
- Participants: ~40 students
- Deaths: 7
- Injuries: 4

On 2 March 2021, 11 students fell when the fourth-floor railings at the Public University of El Alto gave way during a crowd surge at a student protest. Two people, a man and a woman, survived by landing onto the balcony below, while nine people fell four floors down, with seven dying as a result.

== Event ==
At 8:00 BOT (UTC−04:00), students of the Business Administration program had gathered at UPEA to participate in an student protest held at the Public University's Area of Economic, Financial, and Administrative Sciences led by a student named Wilson Quispe Chura. Head Secretary of the department, Juan Jhamil Condori Limachi, was in the room hiding from students.

Before the collapse, some organizers were giving speeches outside before the crowd went into the building. Large crowds were present, with many people debating and pushing each other. Men and women were seen shoving each other, pulling at each other's hair, and even attacking each other with thrown objects. Minutes before the railings gave way, a group of women were in a small fight next to the balcony. The women were pushed against the railings, including a woman in a pink trench coat was pushed hard into the railings a minute before the collapse. A group of people on the right side started pushing forward. Seconds before the collapse, a woman in a light blue shirt moved past the crowd to fight another woman in a red puffer jacket.

Around 40 people were packed tightly together as people were trying to get into and out of the assembly room where the protest was happening. Due to the immense crowd of people, some students were forced to sit along the ledge of the balcony. A few people on the ledge showed concerns over the crowd, looking down and trying to move away.

After the two women stopped pushing each other, three pairs of railings gave way. Fourteen people fell off of the balcony, with three women rescuing themselves or were pulled to safety by bystanders. This included the woman in the light blue shirt, whose foot got caught in a pair of railings that broke but didn't fall. The other two women, one in a blue jacket and matching pants and another in a black puffer jacket and gray pants, landed on top of her and held on, resulting in them also surviving.

On the other side, a woman in a BTS beanie and a long black puffer jacket was pushed into the broken railings last second, but manage to push herself backwards, resulting in her not falling off the balcony. A man in a dark blue hoodie were in between two women in pink puffer jackets who both fell (with the one in the darker pink falling on the balcony below), but he pushed into the crowd seconds before, resulting in him surviving.

A male student named Lino Iván Paredes Chambi and a woman student named Carla Rosalia Coaquira Quispe fell onto the balcony below, with Coaquira Quispe falling onto her stomach on the lower balcony, unconscious and fracturing her left elbow; Paredes Chambi was pulled down, but managed to grab onto a man's backpack who was in front of him and swung himself onto the lower balcony, receiving a mild traumatic brain injury. Two others survived the fall four floors down.

== Victims ==
Bolivia's Minister of Government, Eduardo del Castillo, stated that, up to that point, five people had died and three others were seriously injured and in intensive care.

So far, we have reports of 8 people dead and 3 people in intensive care following the incident at the #UPEA facilities. I have just instructed Police Commander Jhonny Aguilera to go to the scene to prepare a full report of what happened. del Castillo, March 2nd, 2021.

That evening, the government reported that the death toll had risen to seven.

The next day on March 3, one of the injured survivors, Limber Lucana Arcaya, died from his injuries.

One of the survivors, Danny César Jaño Rodrigo was originally thought to be presumed dead and was named by media as "Daniel Junio “Dany” Rodriguez", but Jaño Rodrigo survived, and was released from a hospital on March 19, bringing the death toll back to seven. A few media sources listed both Jaño Rodrigo and "Rodriguez" as two different men, with not given "Rodriguez" an age.

The last survivor to be release from a hospital was Marisol Verástegui, who was discharged on March 29.

=== Deaths ===
The six victims were the following:

- Raúl Cadena Choque
- Anahí Chipana Lazo
- Tania Choque Roque of Guaqui
- Gemio Estuder Mamani Justo
- Saúl Yerco Mamani Soria
- and Loyda “Leyla” Suazo Machaca of Sorata.

Cadena Choque, Chipana Lazo, and Mamani Justo died instantly while Coque Roque, Mamani Soria, and Suazo Machaca died later in hospitals on March 2. On March 3, Lucana Arcaya died from his injuries.

=== Injured ===
The original five injured were:

- Limber Lucana Arcaya of Tahuantinsuyo (died on March 3)
- Lino Iván Paredes Chambi
- Carla Rosalia Coaquira Quispe
- Danny César Jaño Rodrigo
- and Marisol Verástegui.

== Investigation ==
The commander of the Bolivian Police, Jhonny Aguilera, explained in a statement that initial technical reviews point to faulty welding of the railing, thus reducing its load-bearing capacity. Authorities pursued four lines of inquiry: first, the motivation behind the student gathering in the context of the COVID-19 pandemic and why it was decided to hold the event in a fourth-floor hall; the reason for the abrupt dispersal of the event; and finally, the cause of the scuffle within the crowd that resulted in the railing breaking

The Public Prosecutor's Office also identified that the railings were poorly welded and filled with putty, making them very weak.

The UPEA legal department issued a statement expressing that it was "collaborating with the respective investigation" and "has instructed an internal investigation into this matter and will provide assistance regarding the health of the affected students and other aspects."

The Bolivian Public Prosecutor's Office ordered the arrest of seven people involved in organizing the protests; seven of the eight were student leaders. The prosecutor's office also announced that the university rector would have to give a statement.

In the investigation of the leaders, multiple students stated that they were pressured to attend the protests and that four hooded men led by Wilson Quispe Chura urged them to go up to the fourth floor of the UPEA building, where they again incited the students to provoke a fight with pushing and shoving.

=== Leaders arrested ===
Between March 2 and 3, the Bolivian police managed to apprehend 9 people, most of them university student leaders who held high positions before the accident and who were identified by the police as the main suspects and immediate culprits of the tragic accident Seven people were on one side while two people were on the other side.

- Wilson Quispe Chura (Executive of the Area of Economic, Financial and Administrative Sciences). Accused of having signed the call for the assembly.
- Fanny Marisol Vargas Calle (executive of the International Business program). Accused of having signed the call for the student assembly.
- Nayeli Choque Tito (interim executive of the Public Accounting program). Accused of having signed the call for the student assembly.
- Pablo Carvajal Pillco (interim secretary of the Business Administration program). Accused of having signed the call for the student assembly.
- Vladimir Poma Ali (Secretary Counselor of the Honorable University Council). Accused of having signed the call for the student assembly.
- Javier Yapu Chipana (interim executive of the Tourism and Hotel Management program)
- Sergio Blanco Mollocheca (General Secretary of the Area of Economic Sciences)

Condori Limachi and a woman named Rosa were also arrested. One of the men apart of Condori Limachi's group, Jhasen, was expelled from the university in 2013 due to disrupting a session at the Honorable University Council. Another man, Brayan, was the boyfriend of the one the victims.

Some media identified the woman in light blue who was fighting as simply "Wara" or "Celeste", who was questioned by police but wasn't charged with anything.

== Impact ==
=== Politics ===
The impact of the accident, along with a bus accident that occurred in the Cochabamba Department of Bolivia on the same day led some parties participating in the 2021 subnational elections to suspend their campaign closing events.

=== Education ===
The legal department of the Public University of El Alto issued a statement expressing that it was "collaborating with the respective investigation" and "has instructed an internal investigation into this matter and will provide assistance regarding the health of the affected students and other aspects."

An anonymous student from the Education program, speaking to Bolivisión, reported that the Local University Federation (FUL) forced them to attend the demonstrations: “They are a mafia [those] who forced us (...) All of them from the FUL, the representative, forced us to go and they forced him. My classmate Yerko Saúl is there, he’s dead; they forced us to go; he fell. If [you] see in the video, he’s the one in blue. Thanks to them, [he] is dead. They always forced us to go for political reasons.”

=== Media ===
The incident was filmed from different angles, with news channels from all over the world including the United States, United Kingdom, South Africa, Brazil, Iran, and India reporting on it.

In India, some reports were saying the video happened in Guwahati, Assam or at a COVID-19 Vaccination drive in Bandra, Mumbai.
