= Eva Copa =

Bolivian politician

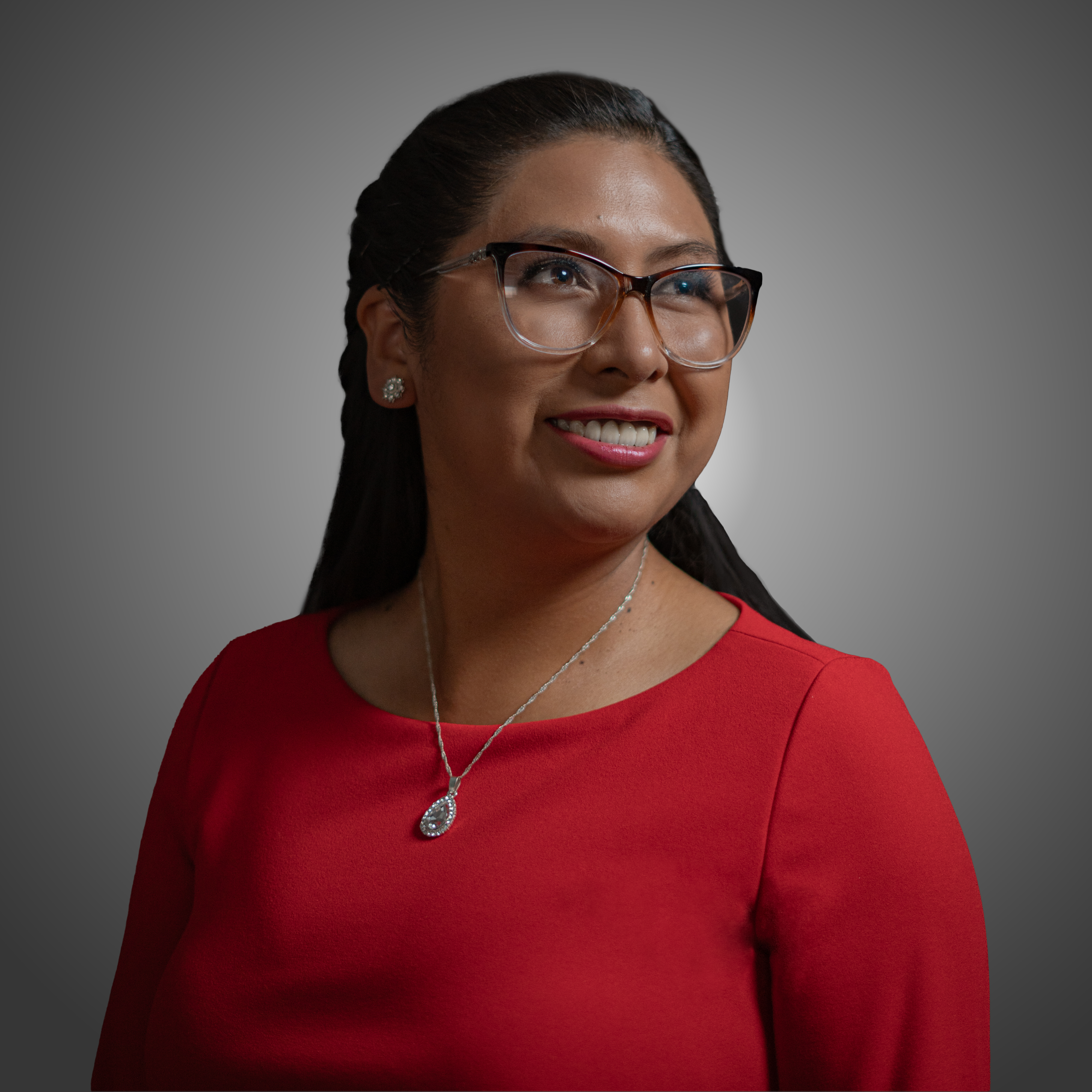
- Portrait, 2023

Mayor of El Alto
- In office 3 May 2021 – 4 May 2026
- Preceded by: Soledad Chapetón
- Succeeded by: Eliser Roca

President of the Senate
- In office 14 November 2019 – 3 November 2020
- Preceded by: Jeanine Áñez (Note: Áñez held the presidency of the Senate for approximately eight minutes on 12 November 2019 between assuming the position at 6:42 p.m. and subsequently assuming the presidency of the State at 6:50 p.m.)
- Succeeded by: Andrónico Rodríguez

Senator for La Paz
- In office 18 January 2015 – 3 November 2020
- Substitute: Miguel Manuel Coñaja
- Preceded by: Eugenio Rojas
- Succeeded by: Felix Ajpi

Personal details
- Born: Mónica Eva Copa Murga; 3 January 1987 (age 39) El Alto, La Paz, Bolivia
- Party: Independent (2021–present)
- Other political affiliations: Movement for Socialism (2014–2020); Jallalla La Paz (2020–2021)
- Education: Public University of El Alto
- Awards: BBC 100 Women, 2022
- Website: evacopa.bo
- Eva Copa's voice Copa is interviewed by the press shortly after clashes in Senkata, 19 November 2019.

Mónica Eva Copa Murga (born 3 January 1987) is a Bolivian politician, social worker, and former student leader. She served as mayor of El Alto from 2021 to 2026. As a member of the Movement for Socialism, she previously served as senator for La Paz from 2015 to 2020, during which time she was president of the Senate from 2019 to 2020.

Born to a family of Aymara descent, Copa studied at the Public University of El Alto, where she held student leadership positions. An unlikely choice of candidate due to her youth, she was elected senator for La Paz in 2014 but maintained a low profile for the majority of her tenure. In the midst of the 2019 political crisis, she quickly gained national prominence when the Plurinational Legislative Assembly elected her president of the Senate, a position of increased importance due to the vacancy in the vice-presidential office. Copa cooperated with the transitional government in convoking new elections, but also remained critical of what she viewed as its undemocratic tendencies.

Shortly after closing the legislative session, Copa was seen as a frontrunner for the mayorship of El Alto, but failed to receive the MAS' nomination. Her decision to present her candidacy on behalf of the Jallalla La Paz civic group resulted in her expulsion from the MAS' ranks. Nonetheless, Copa managed to win the election with almost seventy percent of the popular vote, a significant electoral defeat for the MAS in its historic center of support. On 3 May 2021, she was inaugurated as mayor of El Alto. Months into her term, Copa was ousted from Jallalla due to political disagreements with its leader but maintained a majority of supporters on the city's municipal council, conforming the so-called "RenuEva" bloc.

== Early life and career ==
Eva Copa was born on 3 January 1987 in El Alto, La Paz, the penultimate of seven children born to Clementina Murga, an artisan from Pucarani, and her husband, Ignacio Copa. She was raised in the Pasankeri barrio of La Paz, along the border with El Alto, where she attended the Luís Espinal Camps Educational Unit. While still a teenager, during the gas conflict of the early 2000s, she participated in popular protests that toppled the government of President Gonzalo Sánchez de Lozada. Upon graduating, she hoped to attend the Higher University of San Andrés but, due to the high tuition cost, she instead went to the Public University of El Alto (UPEA). While studying for a degree in social work, she participated in various student activist groups, eventually rising to become executive secretary of the Student Center and general secretary of the Local University Federation (FUL) of the UPEA. In this position, she represented the UPEA as a delegate to the Executive Committee of the Bolivian University's National Congress.

Copa is married to Pablo Callisaya Ajahuana, with whom she has two children: Santiago and Samanta. She lives with her children and mother in El Alto's 14th district; her husband periodically visits from his place of work in the city's interior. Copa is a Methodist, though she has emphasized the importance of Bolivia's status as a secular state. Despite going by her middle name in public life, among friends and family, she is familiarly known as "Moni".

== Chamber of Senators ==
=== Election ===
In 2014, the FUL, as a member of the Regional Workers' Center (COR), submitted Copa, as a student representative, and Edwin Callejas, as a teacher representative, to the Movement for Socialism (MAS-IPSP)'s list of pre-candidates for deputies, in preparation for that year's general elections. Though she was initially ruled out from consideration as either a deputy or substitute deputy, the Supreme Electoral Tribunal (TSE)'s decision to instruct parties to apply the principle of gender parity and alternation in candidacies led the MAS to revise its lists. As its candidate for first senator for La Paz was José Alberto Gonzales, the position of second senator corresponded to a woman from El Alto or one of the department's provinces. Despite being thirty-seventh on the list, Copa was ultimately selected as the MAS' candidate in representation of the UPEA, a fact she only learned by reading her name in the local newspaper. Her nomination was atypical as the registration of candidates for Senate under thirty years of age was uncommon. It indicated that, within the MAS, access to legislative positions relied less on strength in party leadership and more on the occupation of positions relevant to related social movements. Her campaign recruited the support of seventeen of the twenty-six student centers to participate in marches, paint murals, and accompany the candidates.

=== Tenure ===
Elected in the MAS' overwhelming 2014 victory, Copa was sworn in on 18 January 2015. Despite being senator for one of the MAS' major bases of support, her lack of a close relationship with party boss and president Evo Morales led her to keep a low profile for the majority of her senatorial term. This situation changed in the final months of her originally set term, when, after the resignation of Morales and much of his government in the midst of the 2019 political crisis, the remaining senators of the ruling party and the opposition unanimously elected her president of the Senate on 14 November. She succeeded Jeanine Áñez, who two days prior had briefly assumed the position before becoming president. Due to the vacancy in the vice presidency left by Álvaro García Linera, who abdicated in tandem with Morales, Copa's position also correlated with the presidency of the Plurinational Legislative Assembly and left her next in line for the presidency.

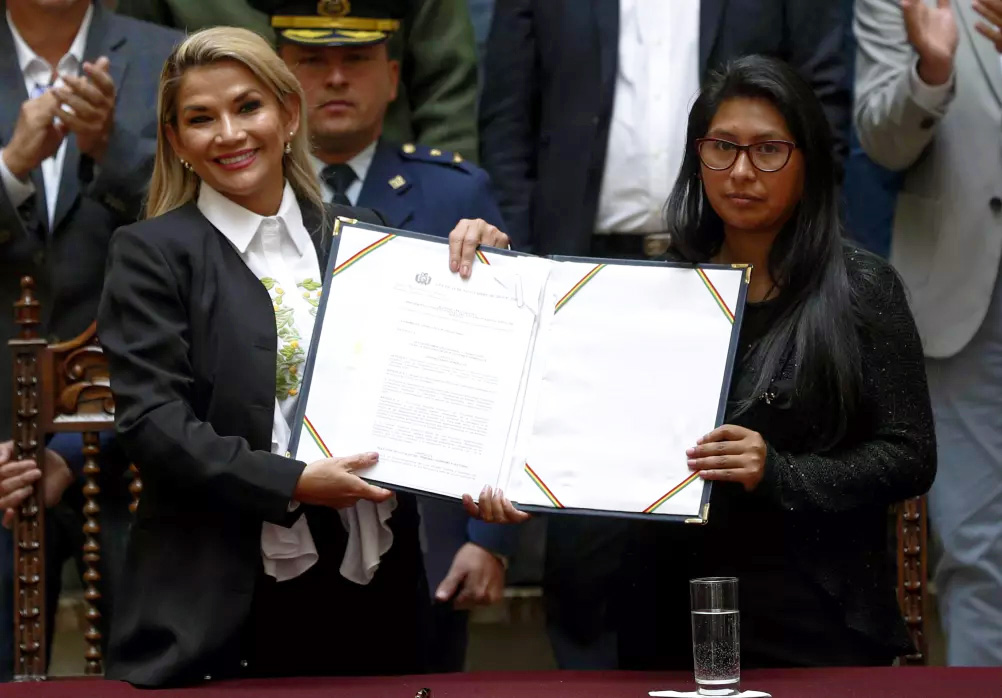
Copa and President Jeanine Áñez promulgate a law to convoke new general elections, 24 November 2019.

Despite the confrontational stance of the more radical sectors of the MAS, Copa took a conciliatory position towards the interim government. In her opening speech, she called on Bolivians to "divest [them]selves of colors, of radical positions", and stated that "what our country is looking for at this moment is peace". In the early days of the transitional government, she pushed against demands by some members of her party for the assembly to reject Morales' resignation and worked with Áñez to enact the law that facilitated the convocation of new elections. Finally, in January 2020, the assembly voted to definitively accept Morales' resignation.

Due to her stances, some MAS groups supporting Morales demanded Copa's removal from the presidency of the Senate. At a rally that ratified the former president as the MAS' campaign manager, leaders of the power plants in Cochabamba proposed replacing her with Senator Pedro Montes of Oruro. At a press conference held in December 2019, Copa denounced harassment from these MAS groups and targeted her colleague, Santa Cruz Senator Adriana Salvatierra, whom she labelled a "radical". By the time of the renewal of the Senate directive on 21 January 2020, efforts to replace Copa had failed to come to fruition, and she was ratified as president of the Senate by a vote of thirty-three to zero with two abstentions.

At the same time, Copa remained critical of the interim government's actions throughout her term. In particular, she affirmed that the government had mishandled its response to the COVID-19 pandemic and had used the health crisis as an excuse to postpone general elections and prolong its mandate. Additionally, she accused Áñez of "breaking her word" by presenting herself as a presidential candidate instead of maintaining neutrality in the transition. Her relationship with Áñez's minister of government, Arturo Murillo, was also one of animosity and included accusations that he had waged a campaign of persecution against members of the MAS.

After almost a year in office, Copa formally closed the 2015–2020 legislative term on 3 November 2020. In her final address, she affirmed her satisfaction with the assembly's work and highlighted that, as president of the Senate, she had succeeded in promulgating "twenty-eight laws in favor of the Bolivian people". She added: "We are not perfect, we could have made mistakes, but we leave with a clear conscience".

== Mayor of El Alto ==
=== Election ===
Shortly after the completion of her parliamentary term, Copa was presented among a broad list of sixteen pre-candidates for the MAS' nomination for the El Alto mayorship. Aside from Copa, the list included former parliamentarians, former ministers, and leaders of social movements and unions. Despite being one of the main frontrunners for the nomination, with wide civic support, it was ultimately decided that former interim mayor and union leader Zacarías "Ratuki" Maquera would be the MAS' candidate. Though Rodolfo Machaca, leader of the party's national directorate, stated that Maquera's nomination had been reached with consensus from the primary pre-candidates, including Copa, the Great General Headquarters of El Alto, a collective of local trade unions, rejected the candidacy. Union leader Bernardo Huanca accused Evo Morales of interfering in the designation of candidates and affirmed that Maquera's candidacy would entail a repeat of the 2015 election, in which then-incumbent mayor Edgar Patana was presented, only to lose to Soledad Chapetón. Víctor Tarqui, executive of the El Alto drivers' union, further asserted that Copa had the support of all twenty-one of the union's member organizations, as well as ninety percent of the population.

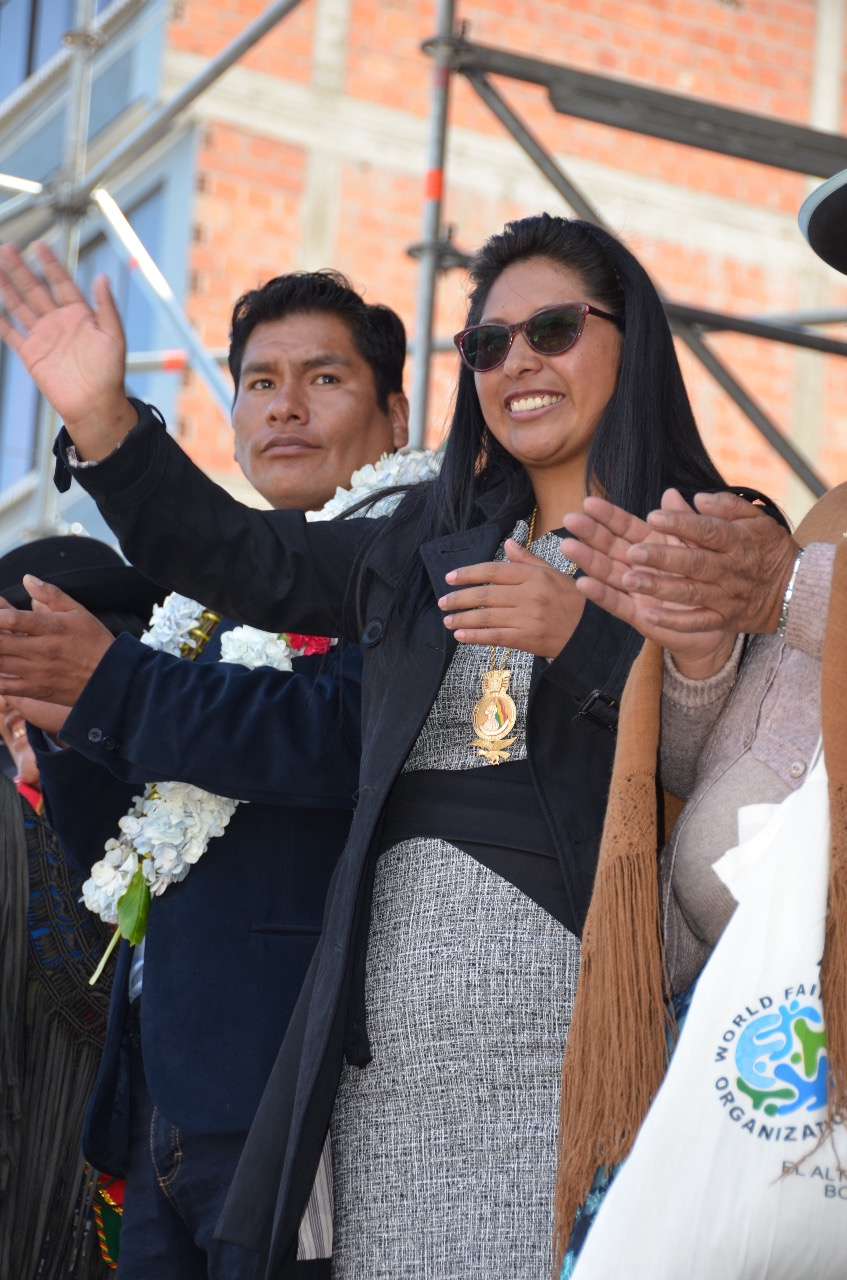
Copa at the civic parade for the 35th anniversary of El Alto.

In the following days, Copa received multiple invitations to be the candidate of various opposition civic groups and political parties. Despite this, she stated that she "waited until the last moment" for the MAS to reconsider its decision. Finally, on 28 December 2020, Copa was proclaimed as candidate for mayor of El Alto on behalf of Jallalla La Paz, the civic group of Leopoldo Chui. In an interview with La Razón, Copa asserted that she had not endorsed Maquera's nomination, as indicated by Machaca, but rather had committed to communicate the nomination to MAS bases in the city for them to accept or reject. At the same time, she stated that she had not renounced her membership in the MAS and left to it the decision whether or not to. Shortly thereafter, on 1 January 2020, Marco Antonio Poma announced that the party's regional leadership in El Alto had chosen to expel Copa from the MAS for violating its organic statute. Copa responded to the party's decision by stating that "[the] MAS will always be in my heart". Moving forward, she stated that she would "continue to be on the left" and pledged to "build a new political project where young people have opportunities to emerge".

After leading in polls with broad margins over her electoral rivals, Copa won the race with nearly seventy percent of the vote, with Maquera failing to crack twenty percent and the remaining twelve candidates trailing behind with between two and less than a percent. The Copazo highlighted a fracture in the ruling party's historic bases of support, dubbed "Eva vs. Evo". Political analysts pointed to discontent within MAS bases, particularly younger generations, who took issue with Morales' handpicking of political candidates as a primary reason for his party's disastrous defeat in the city. Other factors included Copa's ability to connect with Aymara voters, through a platform that offered a combination of modern management with an indigenous communitarian system.

=== Tenure ===
On 3 May 2021, Eva Copa was sworn in as mayor of El Alto. At her inauguration, she pledged to visit the various city districts in order to hear the concerns of Alteños and find popular solutions. Copa highlighted education, public health, and jobs as the top priority for her administration and stated that the biggest challenge would be to manage the numerous financial and income issues inherited from the previous government. With the end of the campaign season, the new mayor called for unity and reconciliation with the elected MAS councillors, whom she hoped would participate in the city's administration. In keeping with her promise to promote the political participation of youth leaders, Copa announced that twenty-year-old councillor Iris Flores would head the Municipal Council as its president.

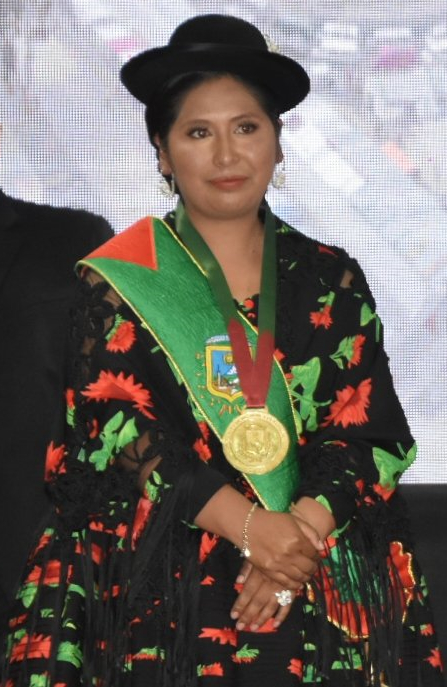
Copa in traditional cholita garb, 6 March 2022.

In the first month of her management, Copa met with numerous social organizations to discuss the implementation of biosecurity measures to combat the ongoing pandemic. The parties ruled out the implementation of a quarantine but agreed to apply the mandatory use of masks and maintenance of social distancing. Additionally, Copa introduced a bill that would authorize the use of chlorine dioxide as a treatment for COVID-19 "voluntarily" and "with informed consent" in order to prevent the unsanctioned sale of the substance. These rules went into force through the enactment of Laws 685 and 686 promulgated by the Municipal Council which, from that date, began a citywide awareness campaign promoting vaccinations and compliance with health measures.

Composition of the El Alto Municipal Council: six Copa allies and five opponents from Jallalla and the MAS.

Less than a year into her term, on 26 August 2021, Jallalla leader Leopoldo Chui announced that the civic group had chosen to expel Copa from its ranks for her "betrayal" of the city and the political organization. According to Chui, Copa's candidacy was predicated on the agreement that her administration would coordinate all management aspects with Jallalla, a promise she had failed to comply with. Chui went on to instruct the city's councillors and assembly members to withdraw their support for the mayor. Rury Balladares, secretary of Institutional Management of the El Alto Mayor's Office, affirmed that Chui's true motivation was to deflect focus from the internal conflicts among the members of Jallalla, especially after Santos Quispe, who was elected governor of La Paz as a member of the group, was expelled just a week into his administration. Copa's spokesperson, David Apaza, agreed with Balladares and added that the administration was not concerned about her expulsion because, of the eight Jallalla councillors, six maintained their support for Copa, while just two sided with Chui. Shortly after, Daniel Ramos, president of the MAS in El Alto, ruled out the possibility of Copa rejoining the party because its statutes prohibit it. Copa similarly rejected a return to the MAS, stating that she would "never again" be a member of the party, despite the rapprochement between herself and President Luis Arce through their collaborations in combating the COVID-19 pandemic. "I have other projects", she affirmed, indicating that she would look into forming her own bloc. Apaza confirmed this, stating that her campaign slogan RenuEva "is already there" and that she would seek to register her political platform with the Supreme Electoral Tribunal under that acronym.

Fulfilling a previous campaign promise, Copa convened the Alteñidad Assembly on 7 May 2022 at the Villa Ingenio Stadium of District 5. The event was attended by a majority (Note: MAS legislators from El Alto refused to attend the assembly.) of the city's most significant social organizations, institutions, and national and regional authorities, all of whom approved the so-called Alteñidad Manifesto. As described by El Deber, the seven-point document was the "fruit of the democratic will of the social organizations of El Alto". A significant portion of it focused on El Alto's identity as a city, expressing support for expanding its Municipal Organic Charter in an effort to deepen decentralization in all districts. The end goal of such a project would be social self-management through agreements between the city's political institutions, neighborhood leaders, and organizations. Likewise, the manifesto's charters declared an emergency in defense of encroachment on the city's jurisdictional limits. In economics, the Alteños demanded that the national government allocate more educational and health aid and that public companies contribute more to development within the city. Finally, the city's social organizations agreed to cooperate with the Census Driving Committee to guarantee the participation of the entire population in the 2022 census.

on 28 July 2025 she announced her withdrawal from the as a candidate for the Presidential election and denounced the "political harassment" that her party, the National Renewal Movement (Morena), had suffered. She had been the only woman candidate, saying "It's very difficult for women to be in politics because I've been a target of everyone's attacks. They've been defaming us, they've been harassing us, they've been destabilizing our structures."

On 4 May 2026, she was succeeded by Eliser Roca as mayor of El Alto.

== Electoral history ==
Year	Office	Party	Votes			Result	Ref.
Year	Office	Party	Total	%	P.	Result	Ref.
2014	Senator	Movement for Socialism	1,006,433	68.92%	1st (Note: Presented on an electoral list. The data shown represents the share of the vote the entire party/alliance received in that constituency.)	Won	
2021	Mayor	Jallalla La Paz	406,700	68.70%	1st	Won	
Source: Plurinational Electoral Organ | Electoral Atlas

Senate of Bolivia
Preceded by Eugenio Rojas	Senator for La Paz; 2015–2020; Served alongside: José Alberto Gonzales, Jorge Choque, Ancelma Perlacios, Máxima Apaza	Succeeded by Felix Ajpi
Preceded by Jeanine Áñez	President of the Senate; 2019–2020	Succeeded by Andrónico Rodríguez
Political offices
Preceded by Jeanine Áñez	President of the Plurinational; Legislative Assembly; 2019–2020	Succeeded by David Choquehuanca as Vice President
Preceded by Soledad Chapetón	Mayor of El Alto; 2021–present	Incumbent
