= Condarco =

Condarco is a surname. Notable people with the surname include:

- Gonzalo Condarco, Bolivian sculptor
- José Antonio Álvarez Condarco (1780–1855), Argentinian soldier
