= 2021 El Alto municipal election =

Bolivian election

- 7 March 2021

Mayor, all 11 seats on the El Alto Municipal Council
- Opinion polls
- Registered: 703,901
- Turnout: 90.10% (▲0.74 pp)
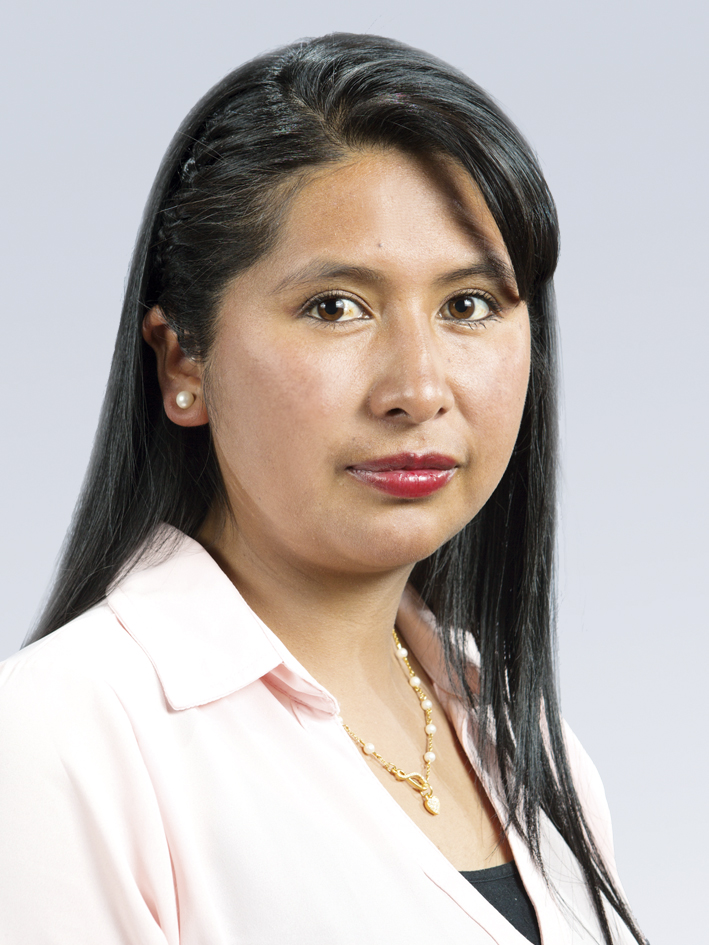

	First party	Second party	Third party
Candidate	Eva Copa	Zacarías Maquera	Henry Contreras
Party	J.A.LLALLA.L.P.	MAS-IPSP	UN
Last election	new	4 seats, 32.34%	6 seats, 54.49%
Seats won	8	3	0
Seat change	▲8	▼1	▼4 (Note: In 2018, two UN councilmen left the party to form Venceremos. As such, the net decrease in seats in this election was four for UN and two for Venceremos.)
Popular vote	406,700	113,310	12,213
Percentage	68.70%	19.14%	2.06%
Swing	new	▼13.2 pp	▼52.43 pp
	Fourth party	Fifth party
Candidate	Óscar Huanca	Javier Tarqui
Party	Venceremos	SOL.bo
Last election	new	1 seat, 5.85%
Seats won	0	0
Seat change	▼2	▼1
Popular vote	11,331	7,428
Percentage	1.91%	1.25%
Swing	new	▼4.6 pp
Mayor before election
Soledad Chapetón
UN
Mayor after election
Eva Copa
J.A.LLALLA.L.P.

The 2021 El Alto municipal election was held on Sunday, 7 March 2021, to elect the mayor and eleven councillors to the El Alto Municipal Council. Incumbent Mayor Soledad Chapetón was eligible to seek a second term but declined for personal reasons. Fourteen fronts (seven civic groups and seven political parties) presented candidates. In the election, Eva Copa of the Jallalla La Paz civic group handily defeated Movement for Socialism nominee Zacarías Maquera and thirteen other candidates with 68.70% of the vote to become El Alto's mayor.

== History ==
=== Background ===
In the 2015 municipal elections, the National Unity Front (UN) displaced the ruling Movement for Socialism (MAS-IPSP) from its political stronghold, winning the mayor's office and six of the eleven seats on the Municipal Council; the MAS took four seats and the Sovereignty and Liberty (SOL.bo) civic group won one.

As with all other departmental, provincial, and municipal elected officials, the set term of incumbent Mayor Soledad Chapetón and the Municipal Council was due to expire in mid-2020, completing a five-year mandate started in 2015. However, due to the annulment of the 2019 general election as a result of that year's political crisis and the delay of the rerun elections to October 2020, the terms of subnational authorities were extended by one year.

=== Political groups and campaigns ===
==== Movement for Socialism ====
===== Pre-candidates =====
A total of sixteen individuals appeared on the party's published list of pre-candidates considered for the nomination by the MAS:

- Wilma Alanoca, former El Alto councillor and minister of cultures
- Sergio Choque, former deputy and president of the Chamber of Deputies
- Eva Copa, former senator and president of the Chamber of Senators
- Emilio Gutiérrez, former constituent of the Constituent Assembly
- Gerardo Itapullu, union leader
- Claudio Luna, member of FEJUVE
- Abel Mamani, former minister of water
- Rodolfo Mancilla, union leader
- Zacarías Maquera, former El Alto councillor and acting mayor of El Alto
- Lucio Marca, former deputy
- Mabel Monje, former minister of environment and water
- Rubén Paz, president of FEJUVE
- Javier Quispe, former deputy mayor of El Alto and former deputy
- Daniel Ramos, union leader
- Basilio Villasanti, member of FEJUVE
- Rudy Luis Alberto Yampa, representative of COREMPAF

===== Selection process =====
According to David Apaza, regional president of the MAS in El Alto, retaking control of one of the party's historic strongholds was of vital importance in order to coordinate the city's administration with the government. Within the MAS, pre-candidates seeking the nomination are analyzed and elected by party leaders in conjunction with regional social organizations. No less than twenty-two pre-candidates were put forward for consideration. Among social organizations, union and social leaders such as Emilio Gutiérrez, Gerardo Itapallu, Claudio Luna, Rodolfo Mancilla, Rubén Paz, Daniel Ramos, Basilio Villasanti, and Rudy Luis Alberto Yampa, among others, were those presented. Additionally, former legislators Lucio Marca and Javier Quispe and former ministers Wilma Alanoca and Mabel Monje were considered.

Among the main contenders were former senator Eva Copa and former deputy Sergio Choque, each of whom had been presidents of their respective chambers in the outgoing assembly, as well as Zacarías "Ratuki " Maquera, former acting mayor of El Alto, and Abel Mamani, former minister of water. Choque campaigned on his long experience within El Alto, first as a prominent trade unionist in the city and then as a deputy in the Legislative Assembly for one of its districts. He assured that "I know the fourteen districts, I know their demands and I could immediately give answers". Mamani, meanwhile, was close to national leaders within the party but failed to garner support from local MAS blocs who accused him of not coordinating with social organizations and presenting his candidacy without support of the bases. The candidates that received the most local support were Copa —especially among younger party members— and Maquera, who was endorsed by various unions.

Finally, on 26 December 2020, MAS leader Rodolfo Machaca announced that, after a series of meetings in El Alto, the party had successfully reached a consensus on its mayoral candidate. Machaca stated that, in the election, the finalists were Wilma Alanoca, Daniel Ramos, Eva Copa, and Zacarías Maquera, and that all of the remaining pre-candidates, with the exception of Copa, who abstained from voting, gave their support for Maquera.

==== Jallalla La Paz ====
Two days after the announcement of Maquera as the MAS' candidate, the civic group Jallalla La Paz (J.A.LLALLA.L.P.) of Leopoldo Chui proclaimed Copa as its mayoral candidate. Her choice to present her candidacy under an acronym separate from the MAS resulted in her expulsion from the party shortly after. Such a decision proved to have broadly negative consequences for the MAS. Copa received overwhelming popular support in the city, especially among Alteño youth, who expressed their discontent with the "dinosaurs" that made up the MAS leadership. They broadly supported her pledge to "build a new political project where young people have opportunities to emerge". Discontent with party leadership was a topic echoed by the Great General Headquarters of El Alto, a collection of twenty-one union and social organizations that endorsed Copa's campaign. For union leaders like Bernardo Huanca, the choice of Maquera reflected the "dedazo" (Note: Term referring to the unilateral designation of political candidates by the point of a finger of the head of the party regardless of the will of the bases.) of party boss Evo Morales against the popular will of grassroots organizations in the city.

==== National Unity Front ====
In 2019, UN announced its intent to postulate Chapetón for a second mayoral term in the 2020 municipal election. However, by late 2020, Chapetón announced that she would not seek reelection and would take a break from politics entirely due to the fact that she was twenty weeks pregnant. On 25 December 2020, UN proclaimed Henry Contreras, former municipal secretary of Citizen Attention and Governance and one of the major figures of Chapetón's administration, as its mayoral candidate. Contreras ran on a platform focused on combating the health crisis, expanding education by constructing more classroom and financing the university education of outstanding students, and promoting entrepreneurship within the city.

==== Other political organizations ====
Ten additional political parties and civic groups presented their own mayoral candidates:

Councilman and formal Municipal Council president Óscar Huanca presented his mayoral candidacy on 7 December 2020. In October 2018, Huanca, together with another El Alto councilwoman and other UN authorities, had split from the party to form the Venceremos civic group. Huanca's campaign presented itself as a native Alteño alternative to the more departmentally or nationally focused parties. Additionally, he pledged that, should he win, he would immediately move to reduce his salary to the national minimum (Bs2,122).

The Christian Democratic Party (PDC) presented the renowned social worker and television personality Fermín Tarquino as its mayoral candidate. However, shortly into the campaign, on 9 January 2021, Tarquino was hospitalized in La Paz after contracting COVID-19. He died from the disease less than a month later, on 26 January. As a result, the PDC sought to recruit Roberto de la Cruz, a former authority of the Regional Workers' Center, though he rejected the offer. The party eventually settled on Abigail Aguilar as its candidate. She ran on decongesting streets through dialogue with drivers' unions and a program aimed at delivering one million cell phones to the city's population.

Additionally, Irene Mamani ran on behalf of Somos Pueblo (PBCSP), the alliance between Rafael Quispe's New Social Option civic group and the Social Democratic Movement. Javier Tarqui, the only incumbent member of the Municipal Council for SOL.bo, ran as the civic group's mayoral candidate. Civic Community (CC) —the country's primary national opposition bloc— postulated Rómulo Venegas, a university professor, as its candidate in conjunction with the civic group Autonomies for Bolivia (APB). Óscar Chirinos and Claudio Lunas, both ex-Masistas, were presented by the Movement for Sovereignty (MPS) and the Patriotic Social Alliance (ASP), respectively. Finally, businessman Hugo Dávalos, professor Pablo Merma, and religious leader Gregorio Condori each ran on behalf of the Front for Victory (FPV), Third System Movement (MTS), and Bolivian National Action Party (PAN-BOL).

== Mayoral election ==
=== Opinion polling ===
Poll source	Date	Copa	Maquera	Contreras	Huanca	Mamani	PDC (Note: Focaliza: PDC Candidate Ciesmori 2–5: Abigail Aguilar Ciesmori 1: Fermín Tarquino)	Tarqui	Condori	Venegas	Merma	Chirinos	Luna	Dávalos	UI (Note: Ciesmori 5: Mario Valeriano Ciesmori 2–3: UI Candidate Ciesmori 1: Edwin Cazorla)	None
Ciesmori	8 March (exit poll)	66.8%	19.9%	2.2%	2.0%	1.7%	1.4%	1.2%	1.2%	0.9%	0.8%	0.7%	0.6%	0.5%	0.1%	N/A
Ciesmori	25 February	74.9%	6.7%	1.0%	1.1%	0.0%	0.0%	0.3%	0.0%	0.0%	0.0%	0.7%	0.0%	0.3%	N/A	14.5% (Note: Blank/None: 2.1% Null: 0.8% Undecided: 11.6%)
Focaliza	21 February	72.9%	7.7%	1.1%	1.7%	0.0%	0.0%	0.0%	0.0%	0.0%	0.6%	0.0%	0.0%	0.2%	N/A	15.8% (Note: Blank/None: 6.3% Null: 3.7% Undecided: 5.8%)
Ciesmori	15–22 February	87.6%	7.8%	1.1%	1.3%	0.2%	0.0%	0.4%	0.4%	0.0%	0.0%	0.8%	0.0%	0.4%	0.0%	N/A
Ciesmori	11 February	76.1%	6.6%	0.3%	0.0%	0.3%	0.0%	1.0%	0.0%	0.7%	0.0%	0.0%	0.0%	0.3%	0.0%	14.7% (Note: Blank/None: 4.7% Null: 0.9% Undecided: 9.1%)
Ciesmori	24 January	66.4%	8.5%	0.6%	1.9%	0.9%	1.1%	0.8%	0.4%	0.9%	0.4%	0.0%	0.0%	0.4%	0.0%	N/A

=== Results ===
2021 El Alto mayoral election
Candidate	Party	Votes	%
Eva Copa	Jallalla La Paz	406,700	68.70
Zacarías Maquera	Movement for Socialism	113,310	19.14
Henry Contreras	National Unity Front	12,213	2.06
Óscar Huanca	Venceremos	11,331	1.91
Abigail Aguilar	Christian Democratic Party	10,596	1.79
Irene Mamani	Somos Pueblo (Note: Electoral alliance consisting of MDS, NOS, and Suma Escoma.)	8,801	1.49
Javier Tarqui	Sovereignty and Liberty	7,428	1.25
Rómulo Venegas	Civic Community-Autonomies (Note: Electoral alliance consisting of APB and CC.)	3,837	0.65
Óscar Chirinos	Movement for Sovereignty	3,484	0.59
Hugo Dávalos	Front for Victory	3,418	0.58
Pablo Merma	Third System Movement	3,225	0.54
Gregorio Condori	Bolivian National Action Party	3,220	0.54
Claudio Luna	Patriotic Social Alliance	3,118	0.53
Mario Valeriano	United Invincible (Note: Electoral alliance consisting of Libre 21 and MNR.)	1,318	0.22
Total		591,999	100.00
Valid votes		591,999	93.34
Invalid/blank votes		42,211	6.66
Total votes		634,210	100.00
Registered voters/turnout		703,901	90.10
Source: Plurinational Electoral Organ | Electoral Atlas

== Municipal Council election ==
Jallalla won an absolute majority of eight of the eleven seats on the El Alto Municipal Council while the MAS took the remaining three. UN, Venceremos, and SOL.bo lost all representation on the council.

2021 El Alto Municipal Council election
Party	Votes	%	+/–	Seats	+/–
Jallalla La Paz	251,676	59.14	New	8	New
Movement for Socialism	108,013	25.38	–10.32	3	–1
National Unity Front	11,157	2.62	–44.24	0	–4
Venceremos	10,880	2.56	New	0	–2
Sovereignty and Liberty	7,945	1.87	–7.52	0	–1
Somos Pueblo	6,238	1.47	New	0	New
Christian Democratic Party	5,250	1.23	New	0	New
Civic Community-Autonomies	4,380	1.03	New	0	New
Movement for Sovereignty	4,212	0.99	–1.57	0	0
Third System Movement	4,154	0.98	New	0	New
Patriotic Social Alliance	3,712	0.87	–2.03	0	0
Bolivian National Action Party	3,030	0.71	New	0	New
Front for Victory	2,688	0.63	New	0	New
United Invincible	2,220	0.52	New	0	New
Total	425,555	100.00	–	11	–
Valid votes	425,555	67.15			
Invalid/blank votes	208,195	32.85			
Total votes	633,750	100.00			
Registered voters/turnout	703,901	90.03			
Source: Plurinational Electoral Organ | Electoral Atlas
