= Gonzalo Condarco =

Bolivian sculptor

Gonzalo Condarco is a Bolivian sculptor. His works are on display in the National Art Museum (Bolivia) in La Paz and the Museo de Arte Antonio Paredes Candia in El Alto.
