= Soledad Chapetón =

Bolivian politician

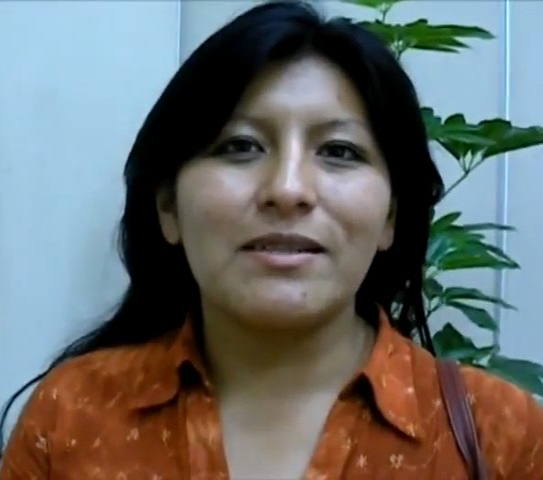
- Chapetón in 2012.

Mayor of El Alto
- In office 31 May 2015 – 3 May 2021
- Preceded by: Zacarías Maquera
- Succeeded by: Eva Copa

Member of the Constituent Assembly
- In office 2006–2008

Personal details
- Born: Carmen Soledad Chapetón Tancara; 25 October 1980 (age 45) El Alto, La Paz, Bolivia
- Party: National Unity Front
- Education: Higher University of San Andrés
- Occupation: Politician

Carmen Soledad Chapetón Tancara (born 25 October 1980) is a Bolivian politician with expertise in pedagogy. She was the first woman to serve as Mayor of El Alto, a post she held from 31 May 2015 through 3 May 2021.

== Biography ==
Chapetón's parents migrated from rural areas to the city of El Alto during the 1960s due to the lack of employment opportunities in their places of origin. Her father, Luis Chapetón Huanca, was a low-ranking police officer from Eliodoro Camacho Province. Her mother, Dalila Tancara, is a small-scale vendor who sells food (pejerreys and carachis), and is from Pacajes Province.

Soledad Chapetón is the youngest of their four children. During her childhood she lived in the Nuevos Horizontes II neighborhood, part of El Alto's District 2.

== Political career ==
Chapetón joined the National Unity Front party, led by La Paz businessman Samuel Doria Medina, in 2005.

=== Constituent Assembly (2006–2008) ===
In 2006, Chapetón was elected to the Bolivian Constituent Assembly, a special body charged with rewriting the country's constitution. She represented the 15th electoral district of La Paz, representing part of El Alto. In this position, she backed the demand that the new Constitution require a two-thirds vote in the Assembly, and opposed the text drafted by the Movement Towards Socialism-led majority.

=== 2010 municipal election ===
In 2010, Chapetón ran for the post of mayor of El Alto on the National Unity Front slate. She lost this election to Édgar Patana Ticona of the Movement Towards Socialism.

During these five years, she put forward demands upon the national government to support the city of El Alto and was a critic of Patana's administration. At the 2010 congress of National Unity, Soledad Chapetón was elected by consensus as vice president of her party.

In 2014, Chapetón was an unsuccessful candidate for Senator from La Paz department. in the Plurinational Legislative Assembly.

=== Mayor of El Alto (2015–2021) ===
In 2015, Chapetón once again ran for mayor of El Alto, this time on behalf of the Democratic Unity alliance (which joined National Unity and the Democrat Social Movement). In the 29 March 2015 elections, Chapetón won 54% of the vote and obtained a municipal council majority of 6 (of 11) members, allowing her to govern and have her executive decisions approved.

She was inaugurated as mayor on 1 June 2015 and became El Alto's first woman mayor.

Political offices
Preceded by Zacarías Maquera	Mayor of El Alto; 2015–2021	Succeeded by Eva Copa
