= Museo de Arte Antonio Paredes Candia =

Bolivarian art museum

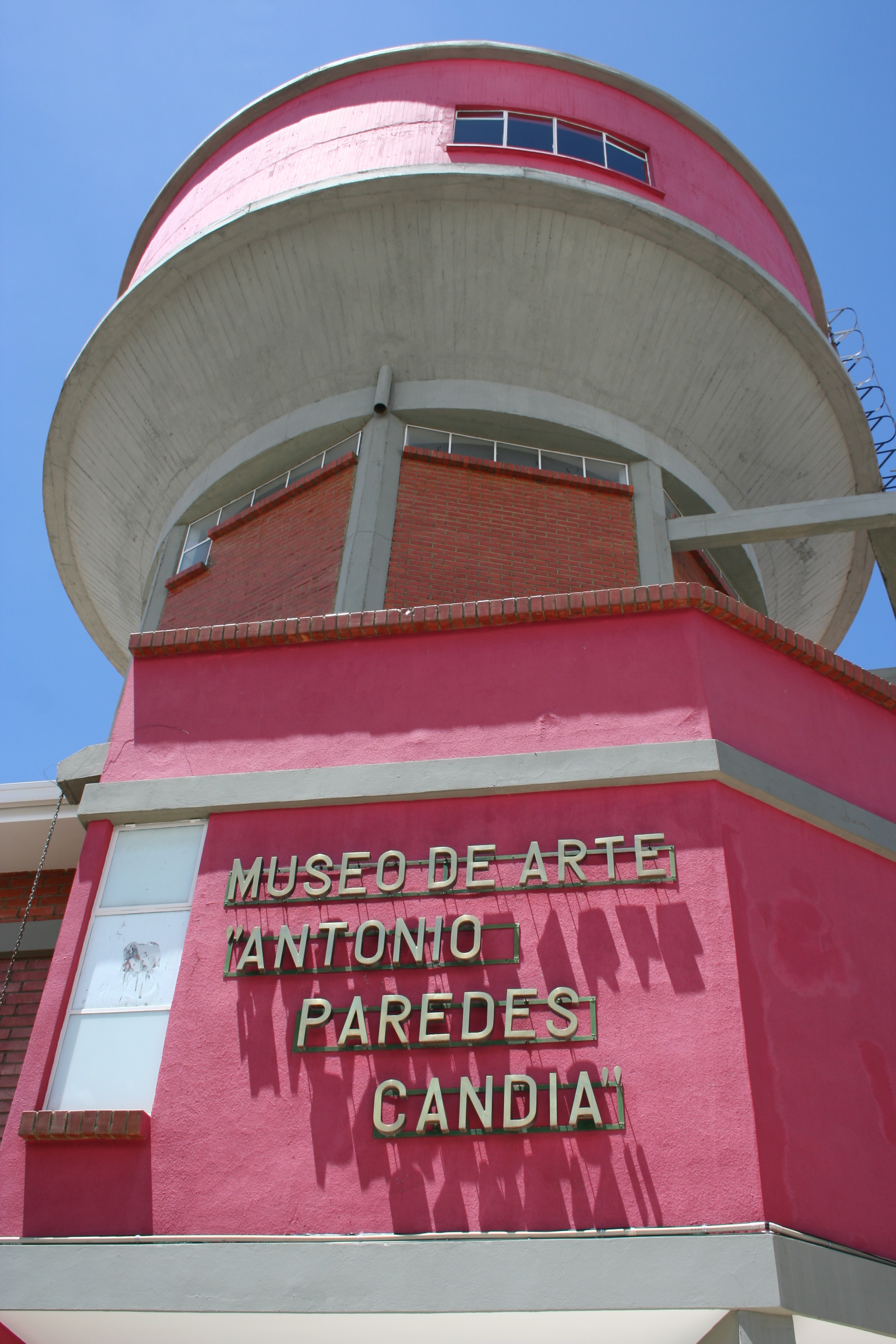
Exterior view of the museum.

The Museo de Arte Antonio Paredes Candia is an art museum in El Alto, Bolivia.

Inaugurated in 2002, as of 2011 the museum contains 503 works of art and 11,931 books. It includes works by Pérez Alcalá, Darío Antezana, Gil Imana, Alfredo Laplaca, Marina Núñez del Prado, Víctor Zapana, Gonzalo Condarco, and many more.

In 2013, organized by contemporary art collective Public Delivery, Swiss-Bolivian artist Luciano Calderon had a solo show titled Ciudad Esperanza.
