= Public University of El Alto =

University in El Alto, Bolivia

- Universidad Pública de El Alto
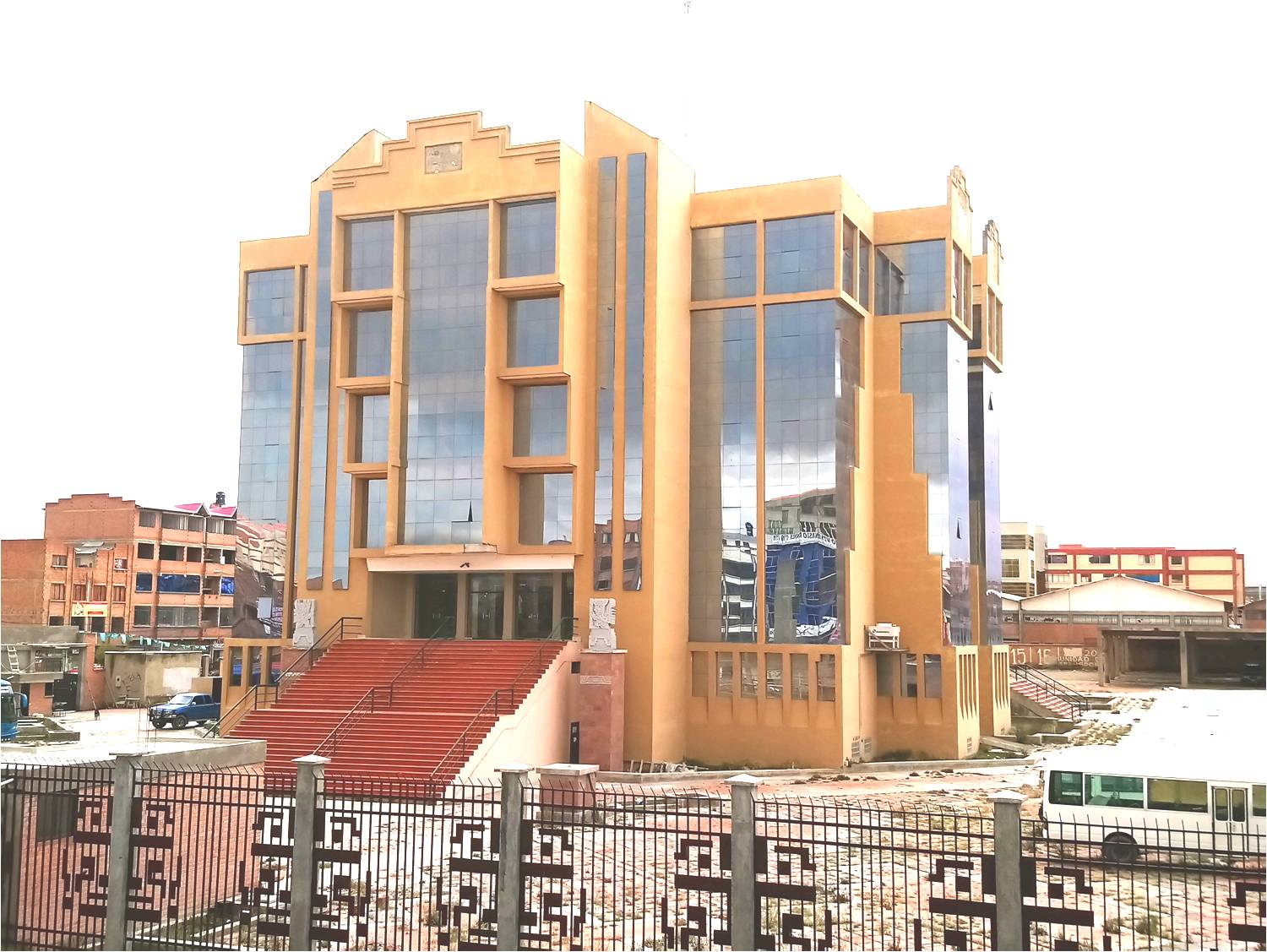
- Motto: La Universidad del Pueblo
- Type: Public
- Established: 5 September 2000; 26 years ago
- Rector: Freddy Gualberto Medrano Alanoca
- Academic staff: 1,398
- Students: 33,480
- Location: El Alto, Bolivia; 16°29′30″S 68°11′37″W
- Colors
- Website: www.upea.bo

The Public University of El Alto (Spanish: Universidad Pública de El Alto), also known by its acronym UPEA, is a public university based in the city of El Alto, Bolivia. The public institution has 8 areas and 37 careers in the areas of medicine, engineering, socio-political-economic, and technology. Within its operation, it is part of the organic statute approved in 2007. According to the Ranking Web de Universidades, an online ranking site for Bolivian colleges, UPEA ranks 42 of the best universities in Bolivia. In 2017, there were 47,861 students attending the university and over 8,000 graduates. It was established on 5 September 2000 after a series of social mobilizations.

== History ==
In 1957, social institutions of El Alto signed agreements with the Higher University of San Andrés (Universidad Mayor de San Andrés, UMSA) in the city of La Paz, to create a faculty with technical careers. The residents within El Alto wanted the university to have professional training courses, not only at a technical level. For this, the inhabitants of this city began a series of mobilizations to achieve a university that has a greater academic offer.

On 5 September 2000, after social mobilizations, Law 2115 was promulgated, which determined the creation of the Public University in El Alto; the same determined that the UPEA would have autonomy in 5 years, during which time it would be in charge of a council made up of the Bolivian Ministry of Education and other government agencies.

According to the law of its creation, the entity with the highest decision-making power in the university would be the Institutional Development Council (CDI), in which members of social organizations of the city of El Alto who had little relationship with the work were inserted academically. The UPEA began a process of institutionalization; therefore, the University Council was reinstated.

== Campus ==
UPEA has several campuses in different municipalities in La Paz, which includes the following: :

- Achacachi
- Caranavi
- Viacha
- Ancoraimes
- Coroico - Cruz Loma
- Mapiri - Chalopampa
- Palos Blancos
- San Antonio de Lomerío
- Batallas

== 2018 protest and murder of Jonathan Quispe Vila ==
In 2018, student protests happened across the university demanding a higher state budget from the government. On May 24th, 2018, a male student named Jonathan Quispe Vila was shot by police officer Cristian Casanova in the heart, dying from blood loss a few minutes later. Initial report by the Police and the media claimed that Vila's death was caused by a firecracker from a protester but this was later ruled out. CCTV and phone video recordings show Quispe Vila and other students protesting peacefully before police opened fire on them causing protesters to fight back. His family lawyers reported that officials denied them access to Vila's case file.

Vila's funeral held at the university campus.

Quispe Vila's death sparked nationwide protests from students, including in La Paz, Cochabamba, Santa Cruz de la Sierra, and Oruro.

In November 2018, a professor at the university named Nelson Vila was injured by tear gas.

In March 2019, Casanova - the police officer who killed Vila pleaded guilty to the killing and was sentenced to 5 years in prison in a summary trial. In January 2020, an appeal by the defense lawyers for the University and Vila's family upturned the earlier conviction . In November 2020, Casanova pleaded guilty and was sentenced to 15 years in prison.

In October 2022, Casanova was released and returned to his police duties.

Due to the protests and murder, the University was awarded 68,000,000 bolivianos (5,739,778 in USD).

== 2021 railing collapse ==
On 2 March 2021 at around 8:00 am, students of the university protested against the Economic, Financial and Administrative Science branch of the school. The protest occurred on the fourth floor of the school, with around 40 students simultaneously rallying. With the large number of students in a narrow passageway leaning on the safety railings, it collapsed. Nine students fell to the first floor and two students fell to the third floor. Six students died and five were injured.

The six victims were the following:

- Raúl Cadena Choque
- Anahí Chipana Lazo
- Tania Choque Roque
- Gemio Estuder Mamani Justo
- Saúl Yerco Mamani Soria
- and Loyda “Leyla” Suazo Machaca

The injured were:

- Limber Lucana Arcaya
- Lino Iván Paredes Chambi
- Carla Quispe Valdez
- Danny César Jaño Rodrigo
- and Marisol Verástegui.

Cadena Choque, Chipana Lazo, and Mamani Justo died instantly, while Coque Roque, Mamani Soria, and Suazo Machaca died later in hospitals on March 2. On March 3, Lucana Arcaya died from his injuries. Verástegui was the last survivor discharged from a hospital on March 29.

Jaño Rodrigo was originally thought to be presumed dead and was named by media as "Daniel Junio “Dany” Rodriguez", but Jaño Rodrigo survived was released from a hospital on March 19th.
