= El Alto =

El Alto Patamarka
- City and municipality
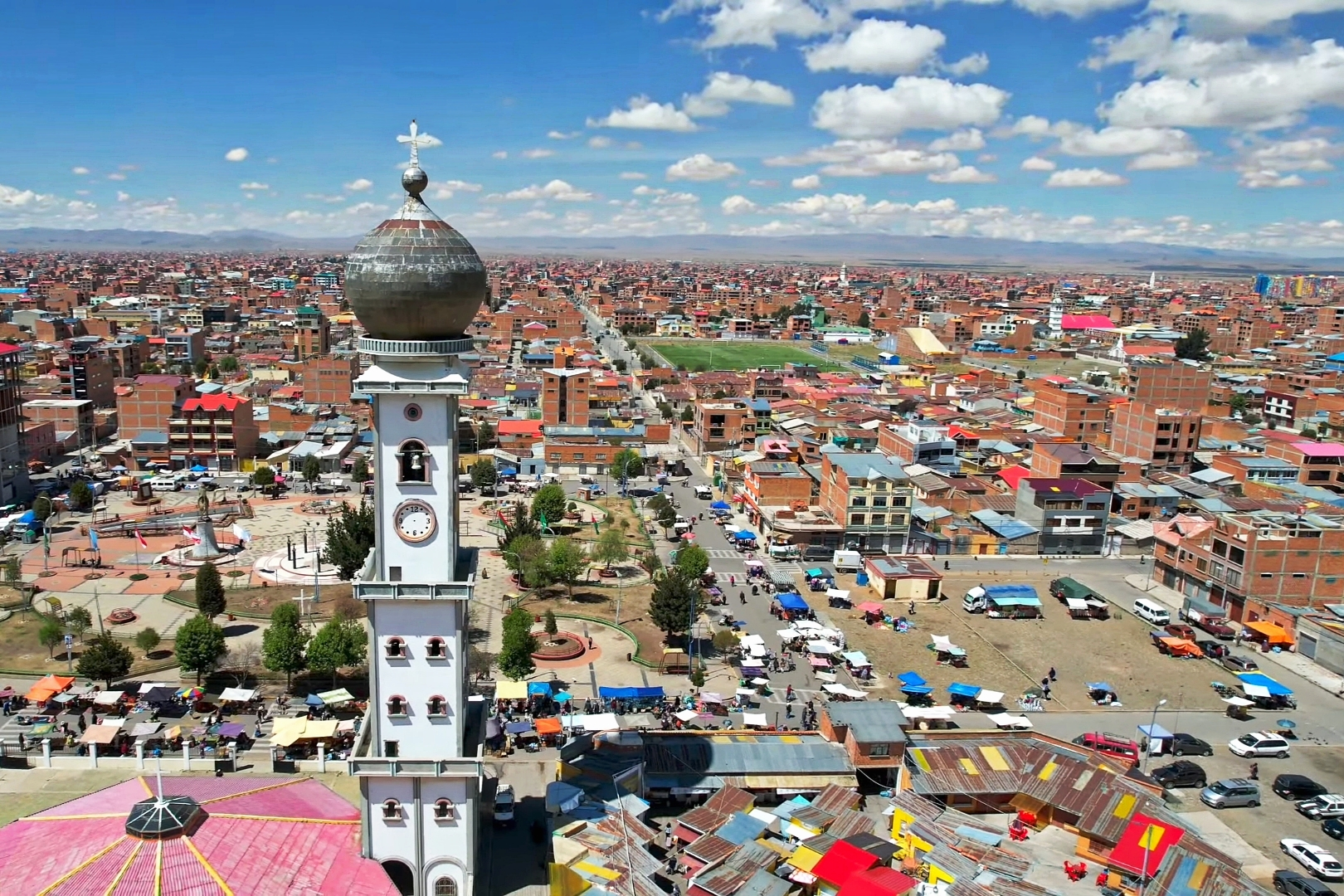
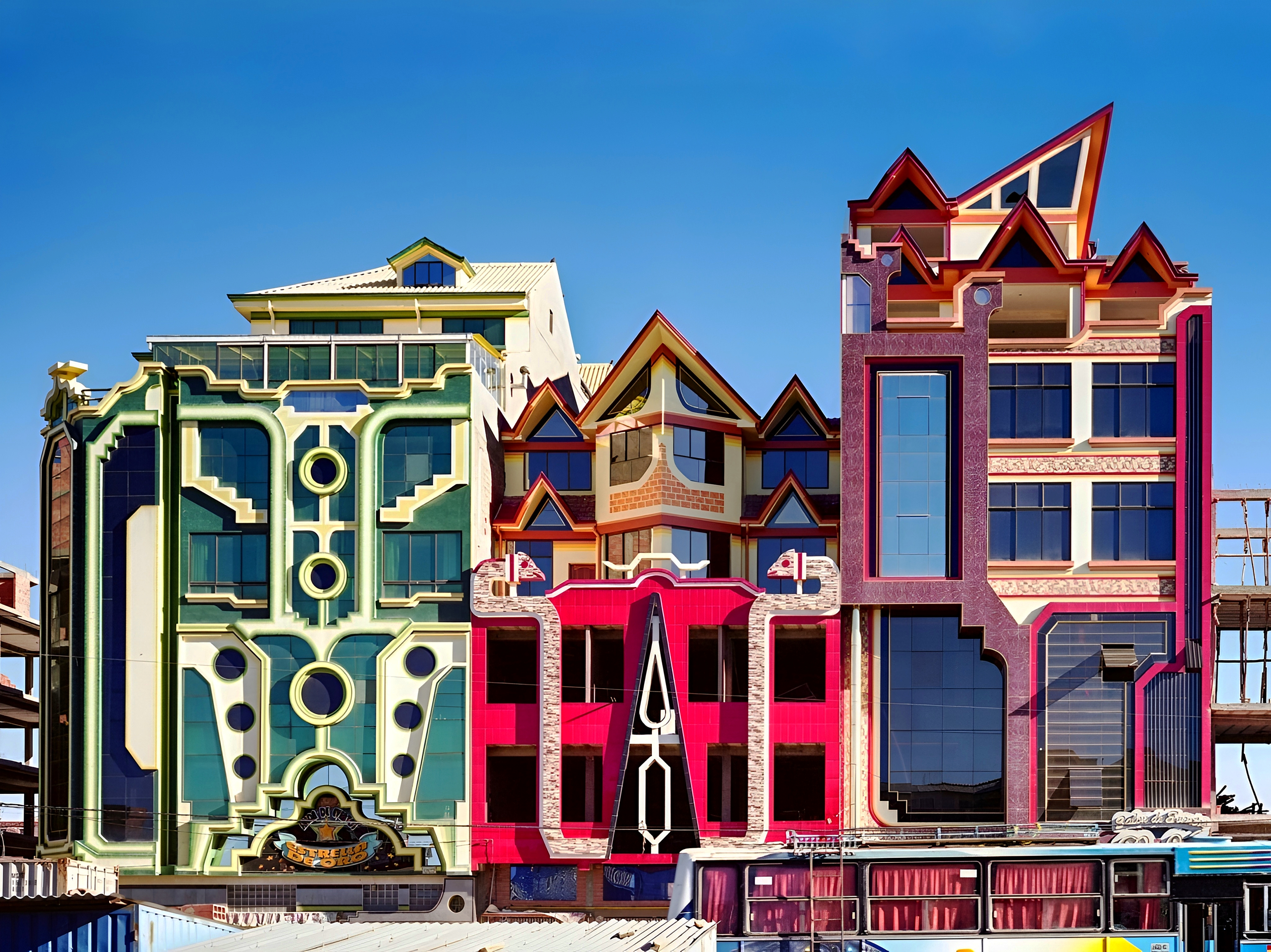
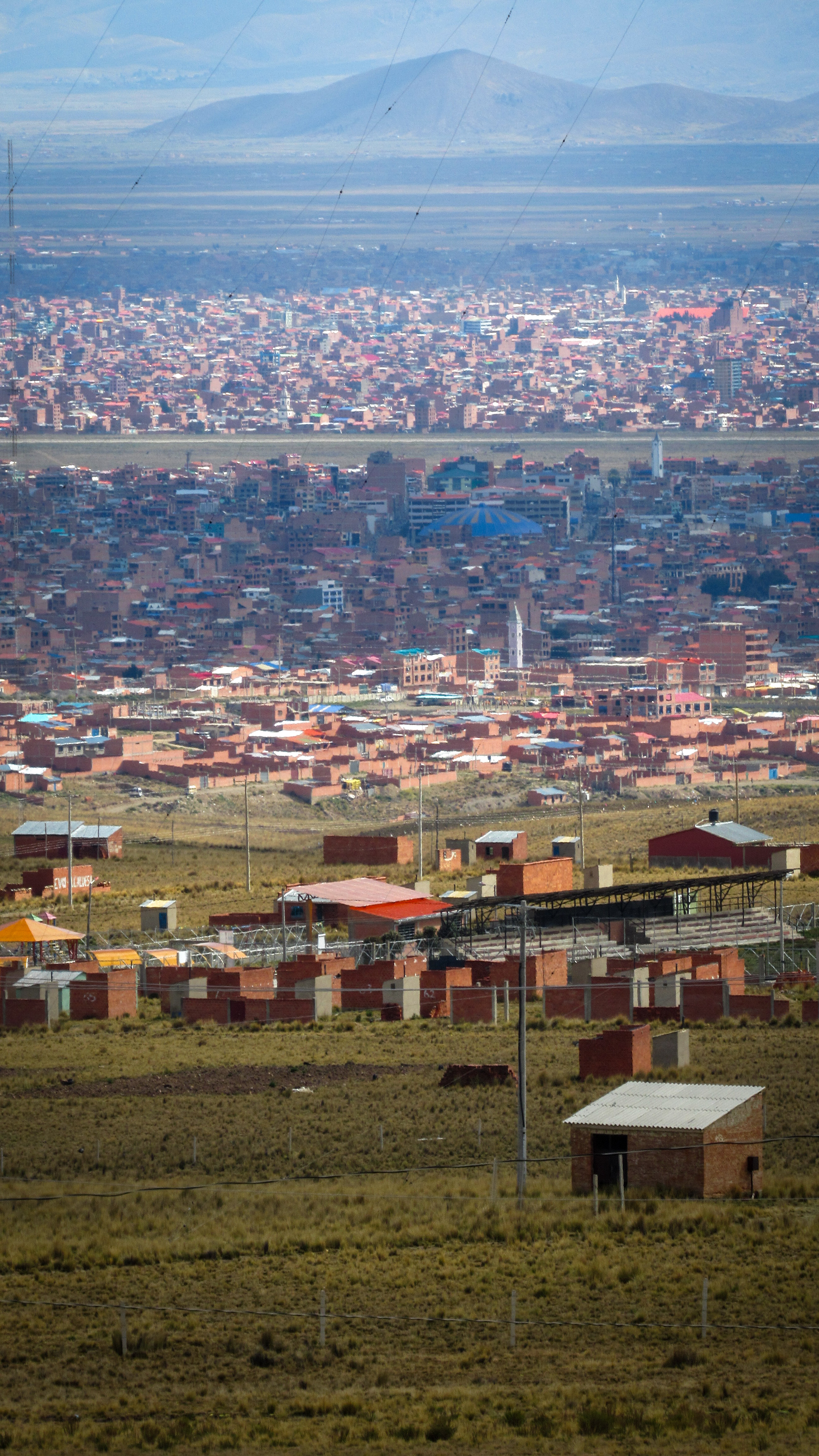
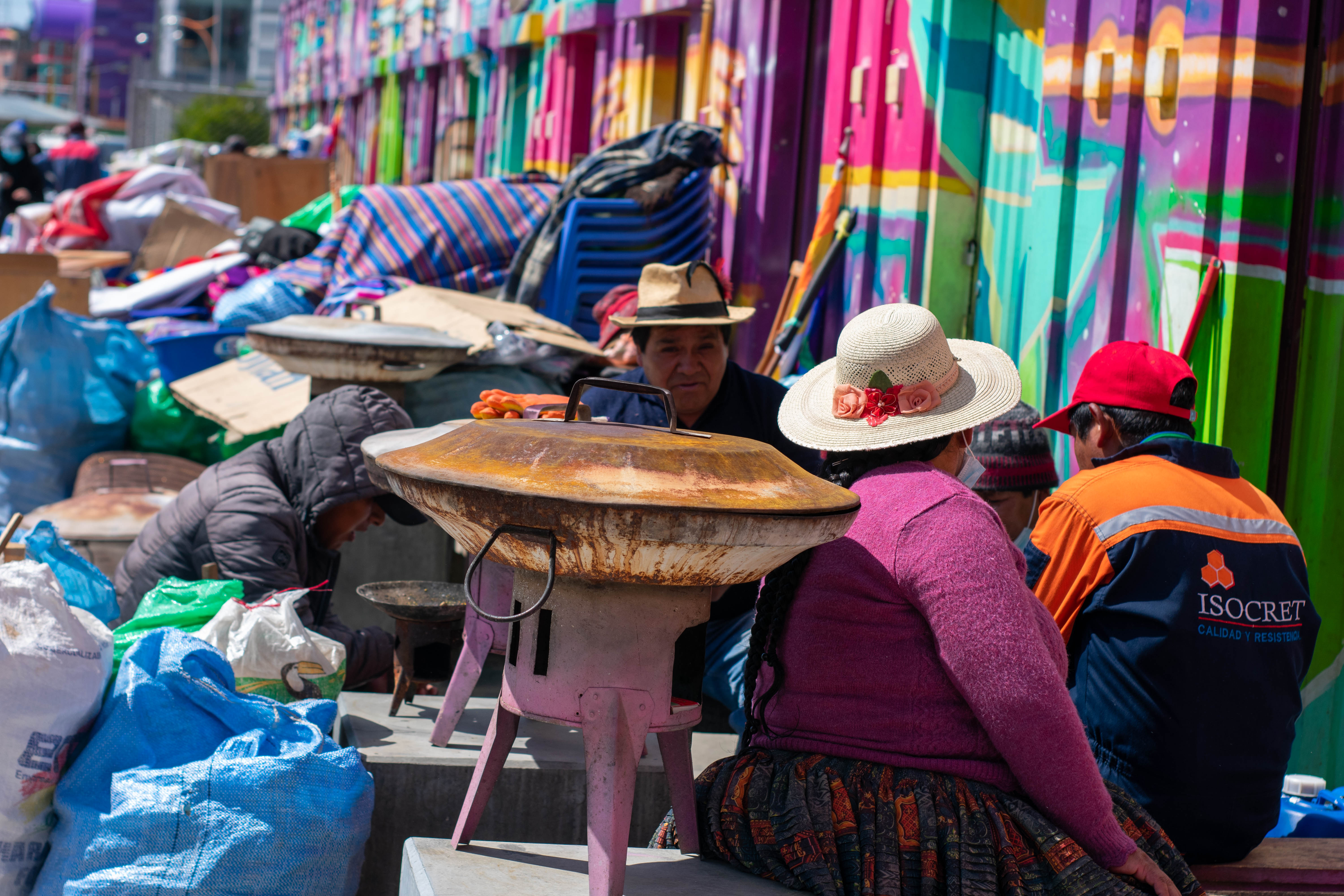
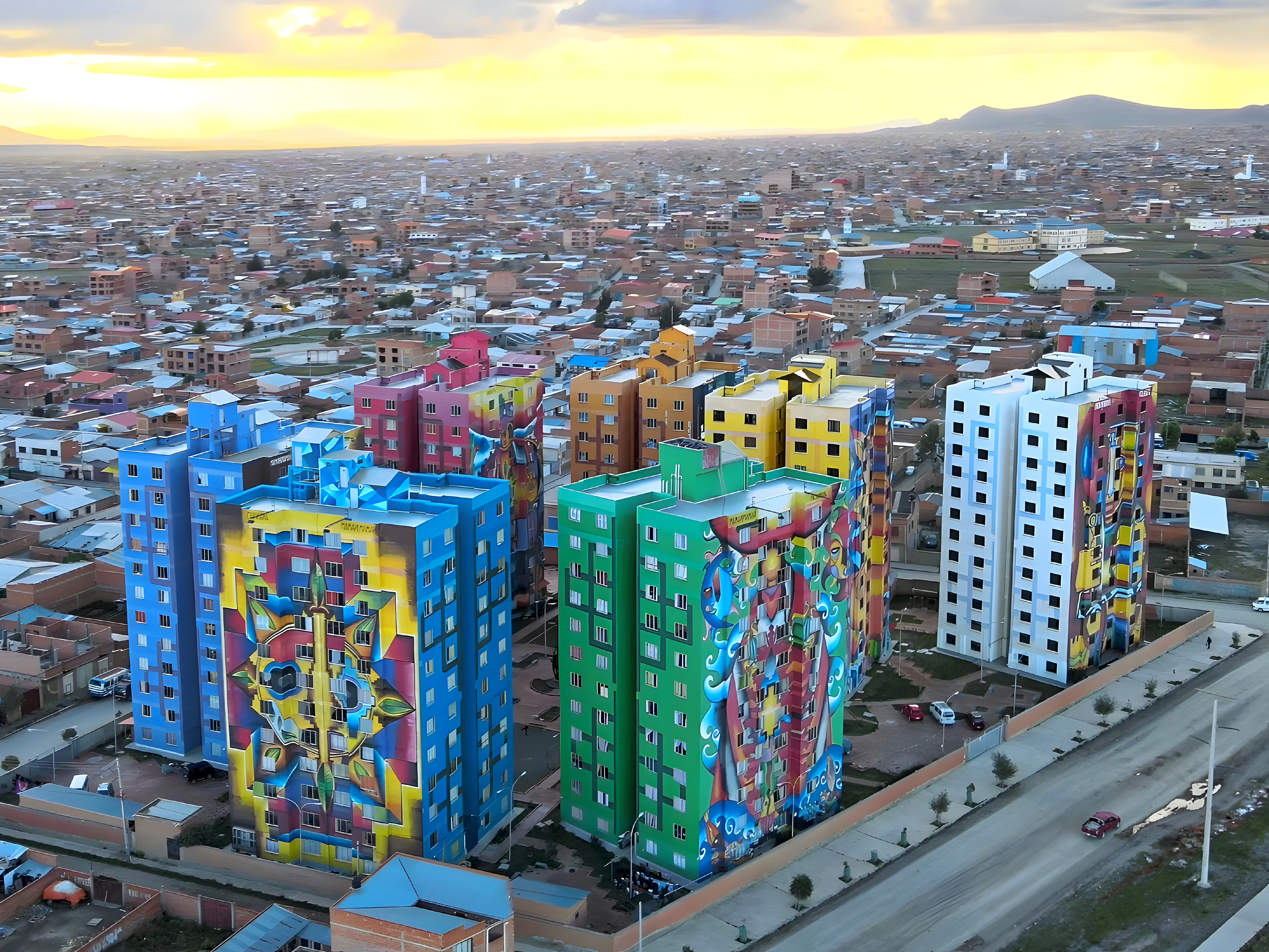
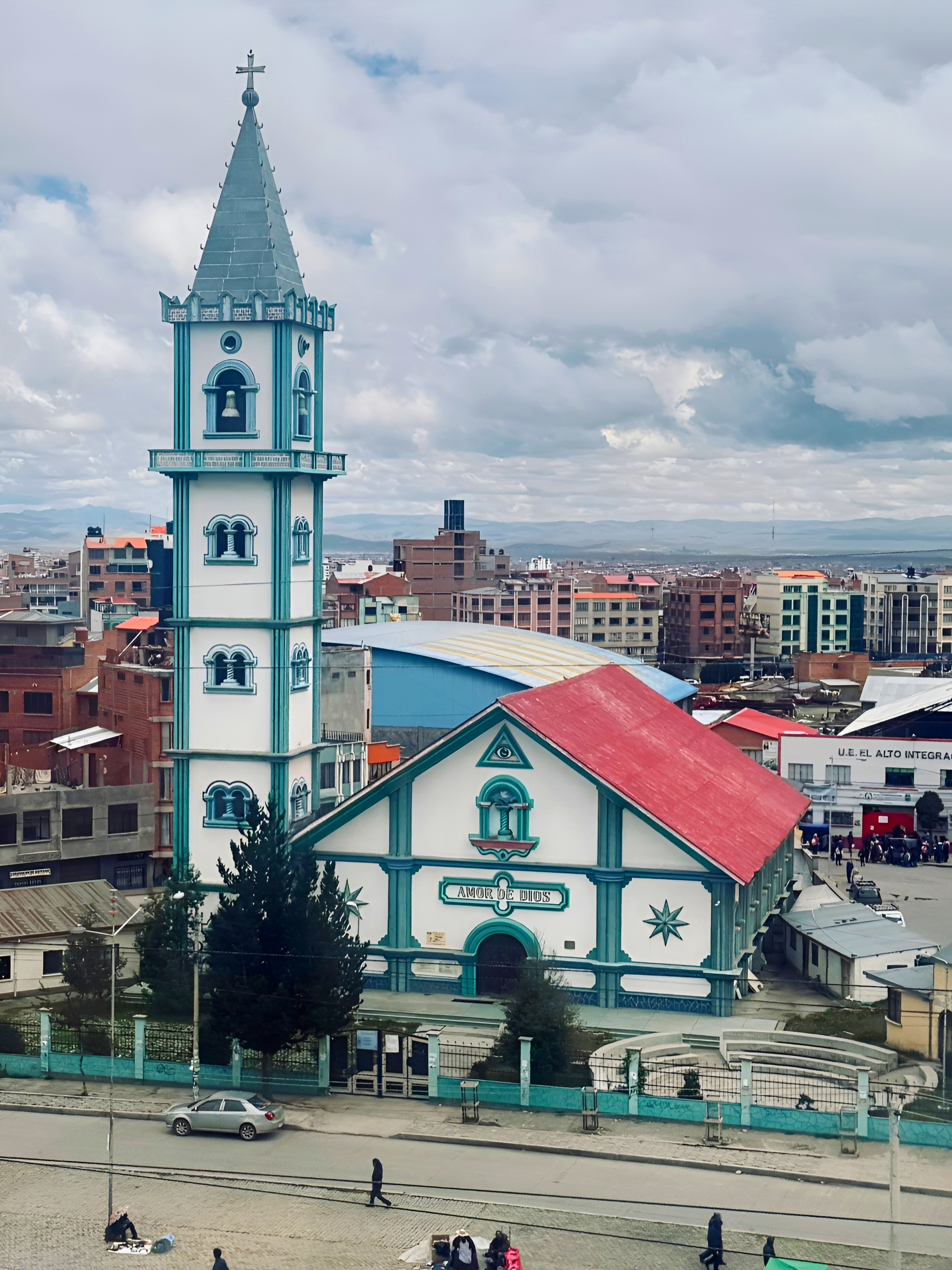
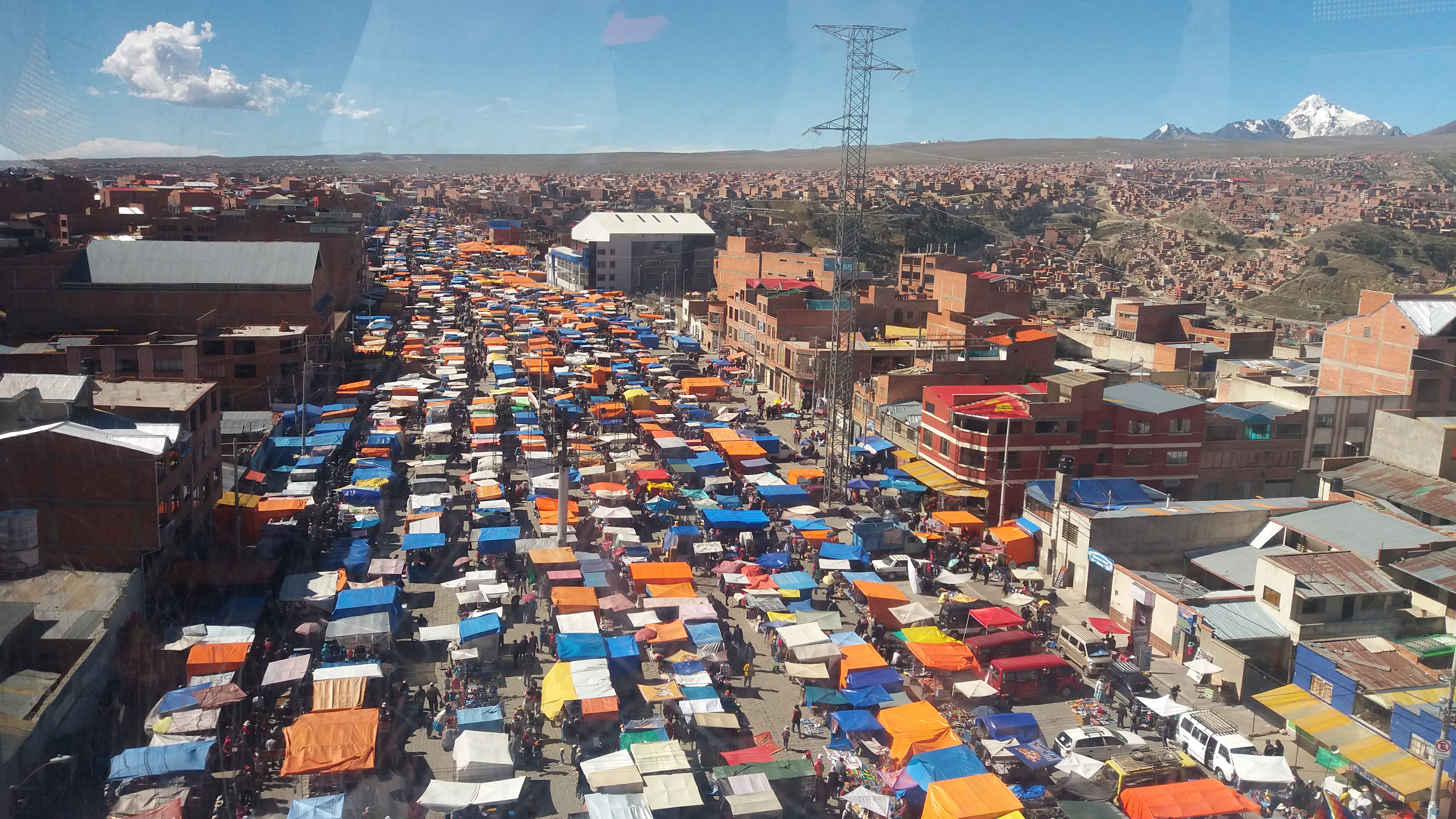
- Aerial view of El Alto Neo-Andean cholets The Altiplano Villa Dolores Mercedario district love of god church 16 de Julio street fair El Alto City

- Flag
- Motto: Desde la cumbre más alta del mundo levántase la ciudad donde jamás se pondrá el sol de nuestra raza (From the highest summit in the world rises the city where the sun of our race will never set)
- Location within Bolivia El Alto (South America)
- Coordinates: 16°30′17″S 68°09′48″W
- Country: Bolivia
- Department: La Paz Department
- Province: Pedro Domingo Murillo
- Municipality: El Alto Municipality

Government
  - Mayor: Eliser Roca

Area
  - City and municipality: 363 km^{2} (140 sq mi)
- Elevation: 4,150 m (13,620 ft)

Population (2024 census)
  - City and municipality: 885,035
  - Rank: 2nd
  - Density: 2,440/km^{2} (6,310/sq mi)
  - Metro: 2,187,233
- Time zone: UTC−4 (BOT)
- Website: Official website

El Alto (Spanish for "The High One", Aymara: Patamarka) is the second-largest city in Bolivia, located adjacent to La Paz in Pedro Domingo Murillo Province on the Altiplano highlands. El Alto is today one of Bolivia's fastest-growing urban centers, with an estimated population of 943,558 in 2020. It is also the highest major city in the world, with an average elevation of 4,000 m (13,123 ft).

The El Alto–La Paz metropolitan area, formed by La Paz, El Alto, Achocalla, Viacha, and Mecapaca, constitutes the most populous urban area of Bolivia, with a population of about 2.2 million. The city is rapidly developing, although significant challenges with substandard infrastructure and utilities remain, especially in the outlying areas.

The construction of an elaborate cable car system connected El Alto directly with central La Paz, dramatically easing transportation into the economic center of the metropolitan area. A locally indigenous Neo-Andean architectural style has developed alongside this growth, giving the city a distinct appearance as it has modernized.

== History ==
On October 23, 1548, Alonso de Mendoza, arriving from Laja, paused at the edge of the plateau that now constitutes El Alto. From this spot—known today as La Ceja—he enjoyed a panoramic view of the Chuquiago Marka valley, the site where the city of Nuestra Señora de La Paz would be founded. With the arrival of the Spanish conquistadors, the area that is now the city of El Alto became a primary route for the flow of migrants toward Chuquiago. Upon viewing the mountain heights and the plateau near the valley they had descended from, the Spaniards named the area "Altos de Nuestra Señora de La Paz." The dry and inclement plain above La Paz was largely uninhabited until 1903 when the newly built railways from Lake Titicaca and Arica reached the rim of the canyon, where the La Paz terminus, railyards and depots were built along with a settlement of railway workers (a spur line down into the canyon opened in 1905).

In 1925, the airfield was built as a base for the new air force, which attracted additional settlement. In 1939, El Alto's first elementary school opened.

El Alto started to grow tremendously in the 1950s when the settlement was connected to La Paz's water supply (before this, all water had to be transported from La Paz in tanker vehicles) and building land in the canyon became more and more scarce and expensive.

In an administrative reform in March 1985, the district of El Alto and its surroundings were politically separated from the City of La Paz (this date is officially referred to and celebrated as the city's "founding day"). In 1987, El Alto was formally incorporated as a city. In 1994, the city became the seat of the Roman Catholic Diocese of El Alto.

Since then, the city has expanded rapidly and can be described as a more urbanized area, with the influx of population occurring in informal environments. Many residents lack access to basic infrastructure, including potable water, connected sewage systems, good roads, and transportation, as the population is expected to surpass 1 million people by 2025.

Furthermore, with new urban growth, the city's infrastructure requires improvement. El Alto is on the path to urban expansion, with new sustainable urban development projects from organizations such as the IDB and the World Bank supporting the development of infrastructure.

On 27 February 2026, a Bolivian Air Force C-130 cargo plane crashed into a road in El Alto, killing 20.

=== Districts ===
El Alto's autonomous government identifies 14 districts composing the city.

== Demographics ==
El Alto was once known as La Paz's bedroom community, though recent growth of commerce and industry has led to concern about water pollution by businesses, including tanneries and slaughterhouses, for the city and communities downstream. Rapid population growth means the city struggles to bring potable water and sewer service to parts of the population, especially on the fringes of the expanding urban area.

== Geography ==
The city contains La Paz’s El Alto International Airport. El Alto is one of the highest major cities in the world, up to 4,300 meters (13,615 feet) above mean sea level. It has a cold climate, with the highest average monthly maximum temperature being 17 °C (63 °F) in November. It is one of the fastest-growing cities in Bolivia, due to immigration from Bolivia’s rural areas to the La Paz region which started with the rural reform of 1952 and increased in the 2000s. Some migrants say the difficulty of growing crops in the countryside drove them to move to the city.

=== Climate ===
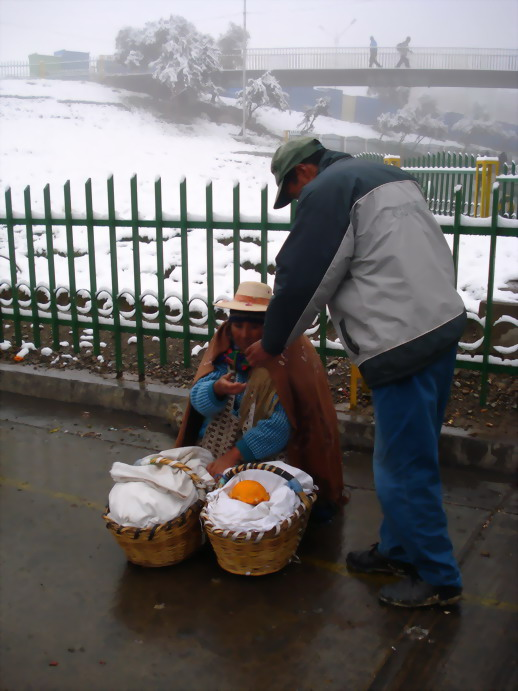
Winter morning in El Alto

El Alto features a cold subtropical highland climate (Köppen: Cwc, Trewartha: Eolk), typical of the tropical Andes at high altitude. Temperatures are typically cool during the day and crisp at night year-round, due to the thin atmosphere and strong radiative heat loss at elevation. Average daytime temperatures generally range between 13–17 °C, while nighttime temperatures frequently approach or fall below 0 °C, particularly during the winter months. Snowfall is possible throughout the year.

The water supply in El Alto has been impacted by drought caused by shrinking glaciers. In 2016 the three main dams supplying water to the city were almost dry due to lack of glacial melt water.

Climate data for El Alto, Bolivia (El Alto International Airport, elevation 4,058 m)
Month	Jan	Feb	Mar	Apr	May	Jun	Jul	Aug	Sep	Oct	Nov	Dec	Year
Record high °C (°F)	25.4 (77.7)	22.8 (73.0)	25.1 (77.2)	22.9 (73.2)	24.0 (75.2)	20.0 (68.0)	23.0 (73.4)	21.0 (69.8)	23.0 (73.4)	23.0 (73.4)	24.2 (75.6)	22.0 (71.6)	25.4 (77.7)
Mean daily maximum °C (°F)	14.3 (57.7)	14.3 (57.7)	14.2 (57.6)	14.4 (57.9)	14.4 (57.9)	14.0 (57.2)	13.5 (56.3)	13.7 (56.7)	15.3 (59.5)	15.3 (59.5)	17.0 (62.6)	15.7 (60.3)	15.0 (59.0)
Daily mean °C (°F)	9.3 (48.7)	9.0 (48.2)	8.9 (48.0)	8.8 (47.8)	8.2 (46.8)	7.3 (45.1)	6.8 (44.2)	8.2 (46.8)	8.7 (47.7)	10.0 (50.0)	10.5 (50.9)	9.7 (49.5)	8.8 (47.8)
Mean daily minimum °C (°F)	4.4 (39.9)	4.4 (39.9)	3.6 (38.5)	1.0 (33.8)	−1.9 (28.6)	−4.3 (24.3)	−4.4 (24.1)	−3 (27)	−1.0 (30.2)	1.5 (34.7)	2.1 (35.8)	3.6 (38.5)	0.5 (32.9)
Record low °C (°F)	−3.3 (26.1)	−3.3 (26.1)	−2.7 (27.1)	−4.7 (23.5)	−10.3 (13.5)	−12.4 (9.7)	−11.9 (10.6)	−10 (14)	−10 (14)	−5.4 (22.3)	−5 (23)	−2.8 (27.0)	−12.4 (9.7)
Average precipitation mm (inches)	133.7 (5.26)	104.7 (4.12)	71.7 (2.82)	31.7 (1.25)	14.3 (0.56)	5.1 (0.20)	7.1 (0.28)	15.2 (0.60)	35.5 (1.40)	38.1 (1.50)	50.5 (1.99)	94.9 (3.74)	602.5 (23.72)
Average precipitation days (≥ 0.1 mm)	20.7	15.8	14.2	9.8	3.6	2.8	2.8	5.1	8.2	10.4	11.5	15.5	120.3
Average snowy days	0.07	0.0	0.0	0.03	0.0	0.03	0.13	0.67	0.37	0.17	0.17	0.03	1.67
Average relative humidity (%)	66	72	67	59	48	42	43	42	48	49	51	60	54
Mean monthly sunshine hours	179.8	155.4	148.8	165.0	229.4	240.0	235.6	226.3	192.0	179.8	171.0	180.0	2,303.1
Mean daily sunshine hours	5.8	5.5	4.8	5.5	7.4	8.0	7.6	7.3	6.4	5.8	5.7	6.0	6.3
Source 1: Deutscher Wetterdienst, Servicio Nacional de Meteorología e Hidrología de Bolivia (snowy days 1981–2010)
Source 2: Meteo Climat (extremes 1942–present)

== Attractions ==
Museo de Arte Antonio Paredes Candia opened in 2002. From 2003, access from La Paz to the international airport, as well to oil and gas supplies, has been frequently blocked by protesting social leaders and some of the most powerful players in the politics of Bolivia. El Alto remains one of the major centers of the Bolivian gas conflict.

El Alto is known for its Neo-Andean architecture, built from the mid-2000s onward.

There is a large open-air market.

== Gallery ==
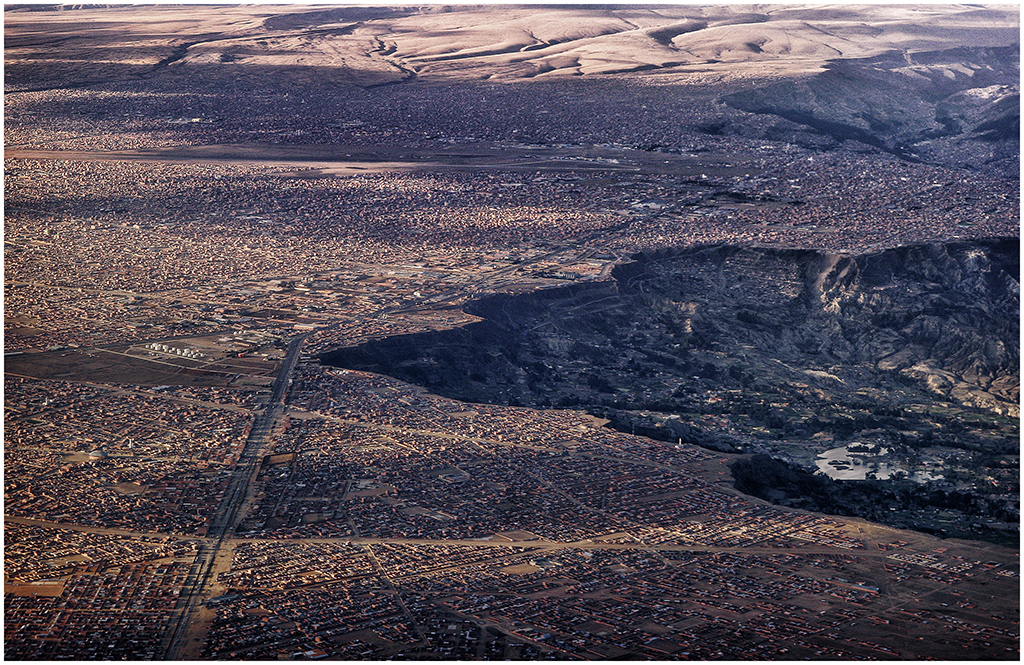
Aerial view of El Alto on the Altiplano plateau, overlooking the descending basin of La Paz.

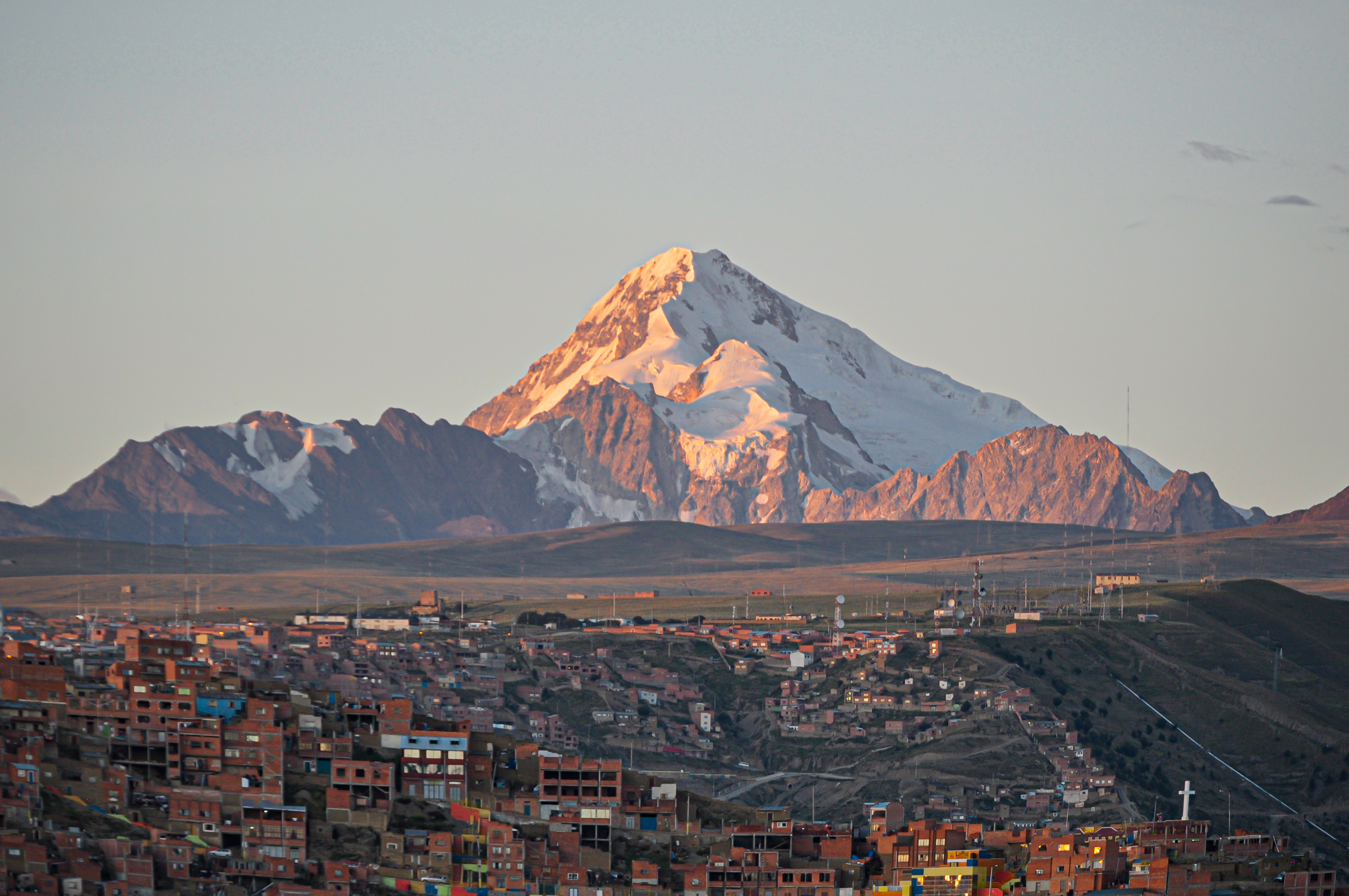
View of Huayna Potosí from El Alto

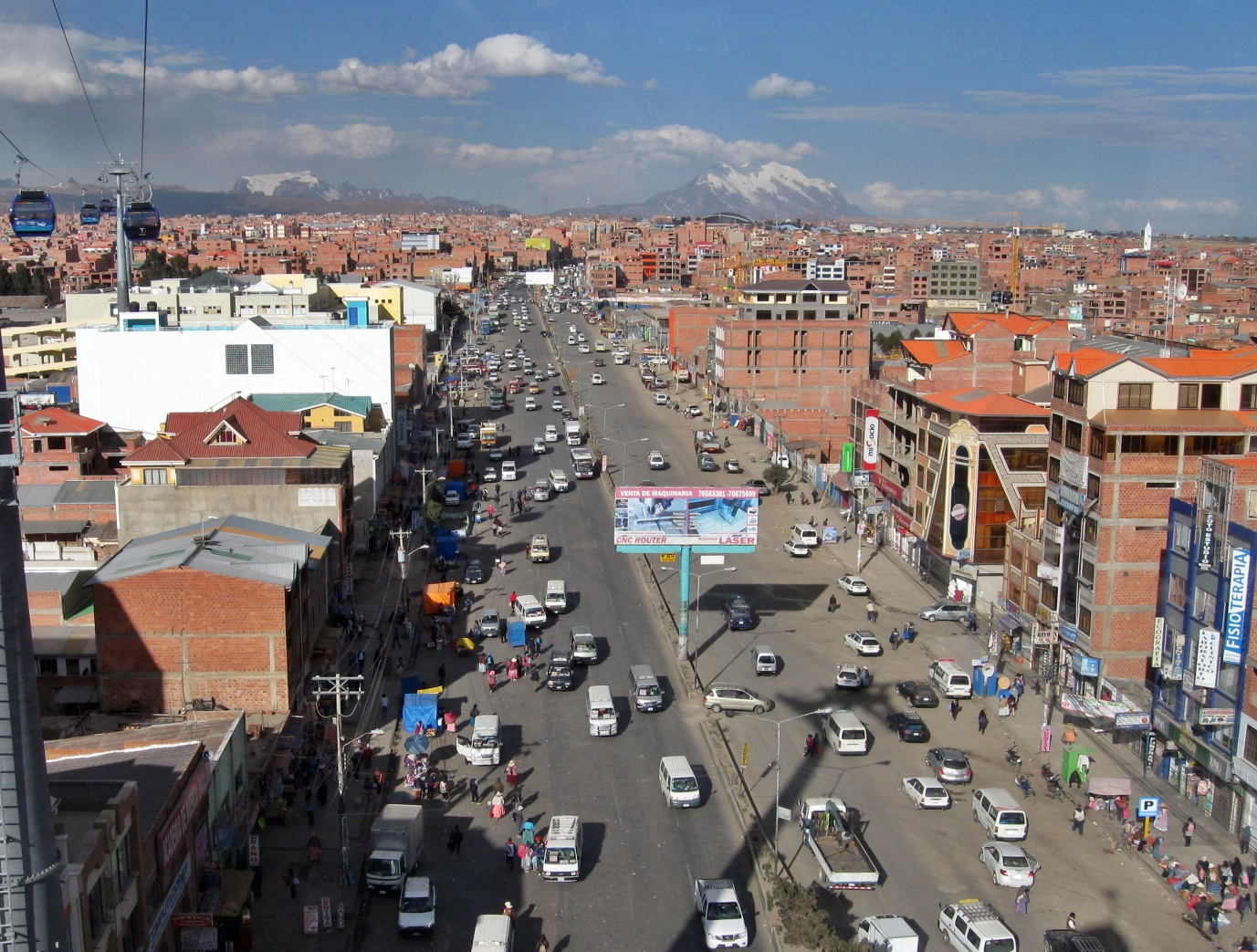
Avenida Juan Pablo II

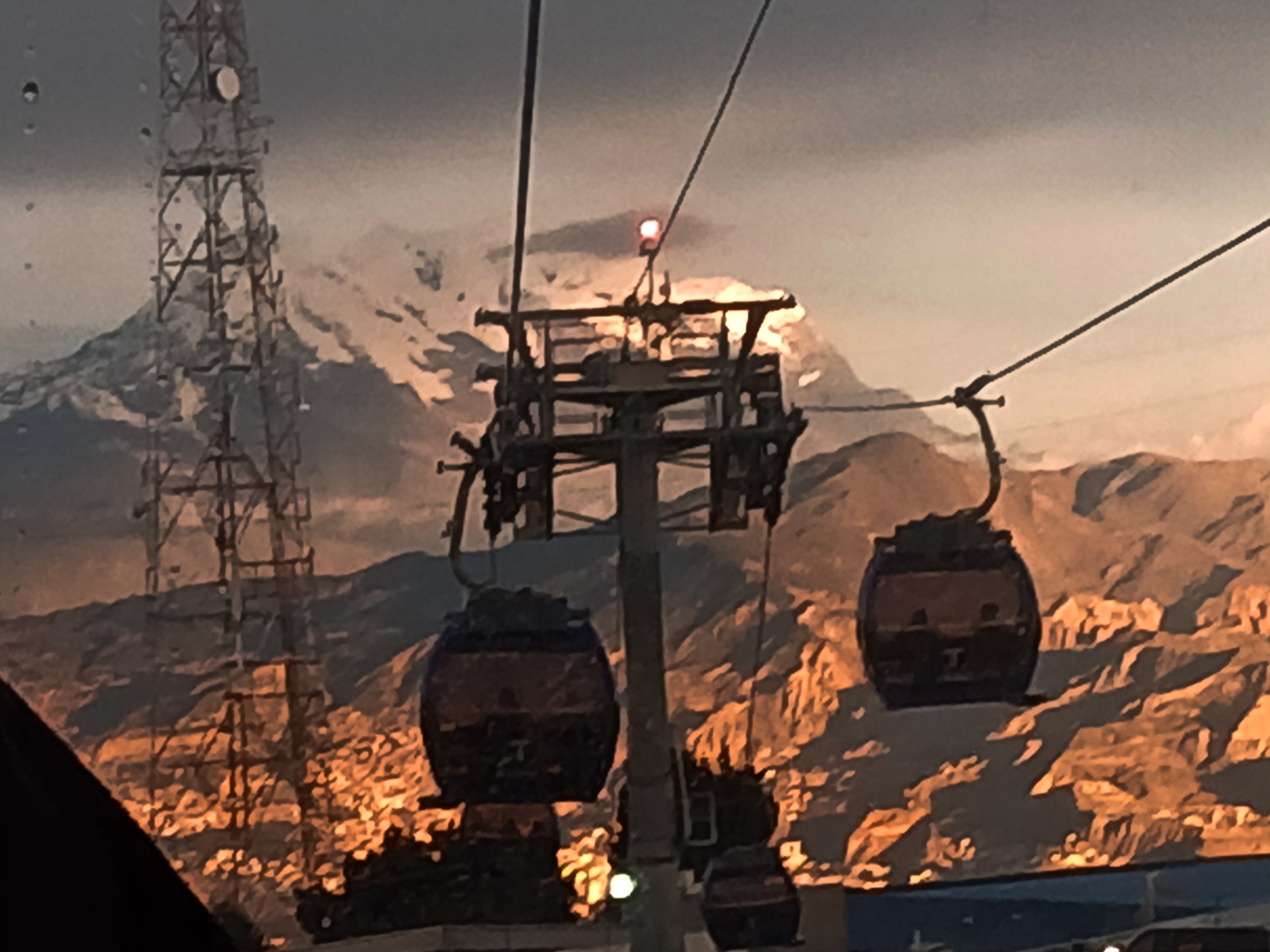
The blue line of Mi Teleférico with Illimani in the background

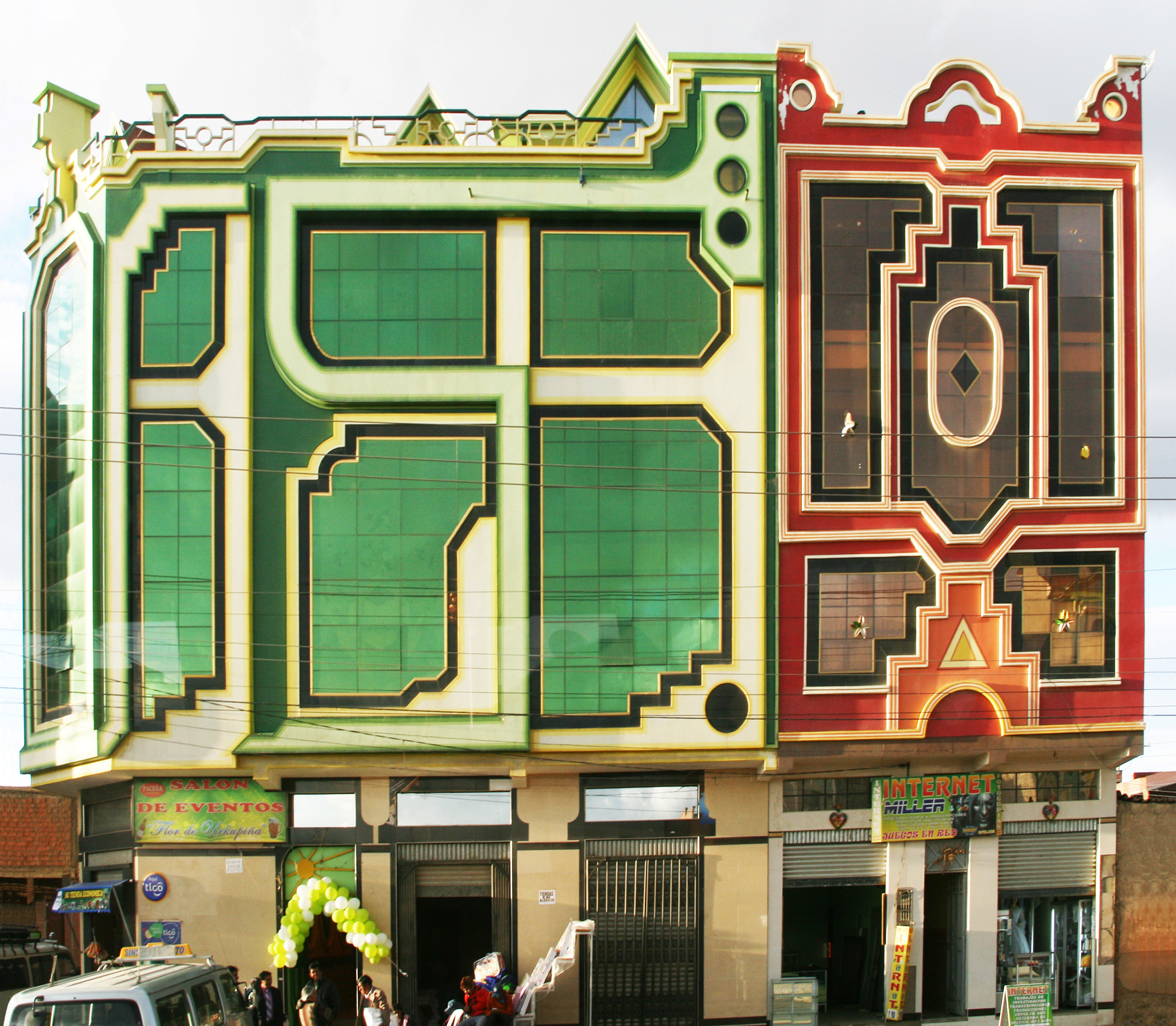
Neo-Andean architecture in El Alto

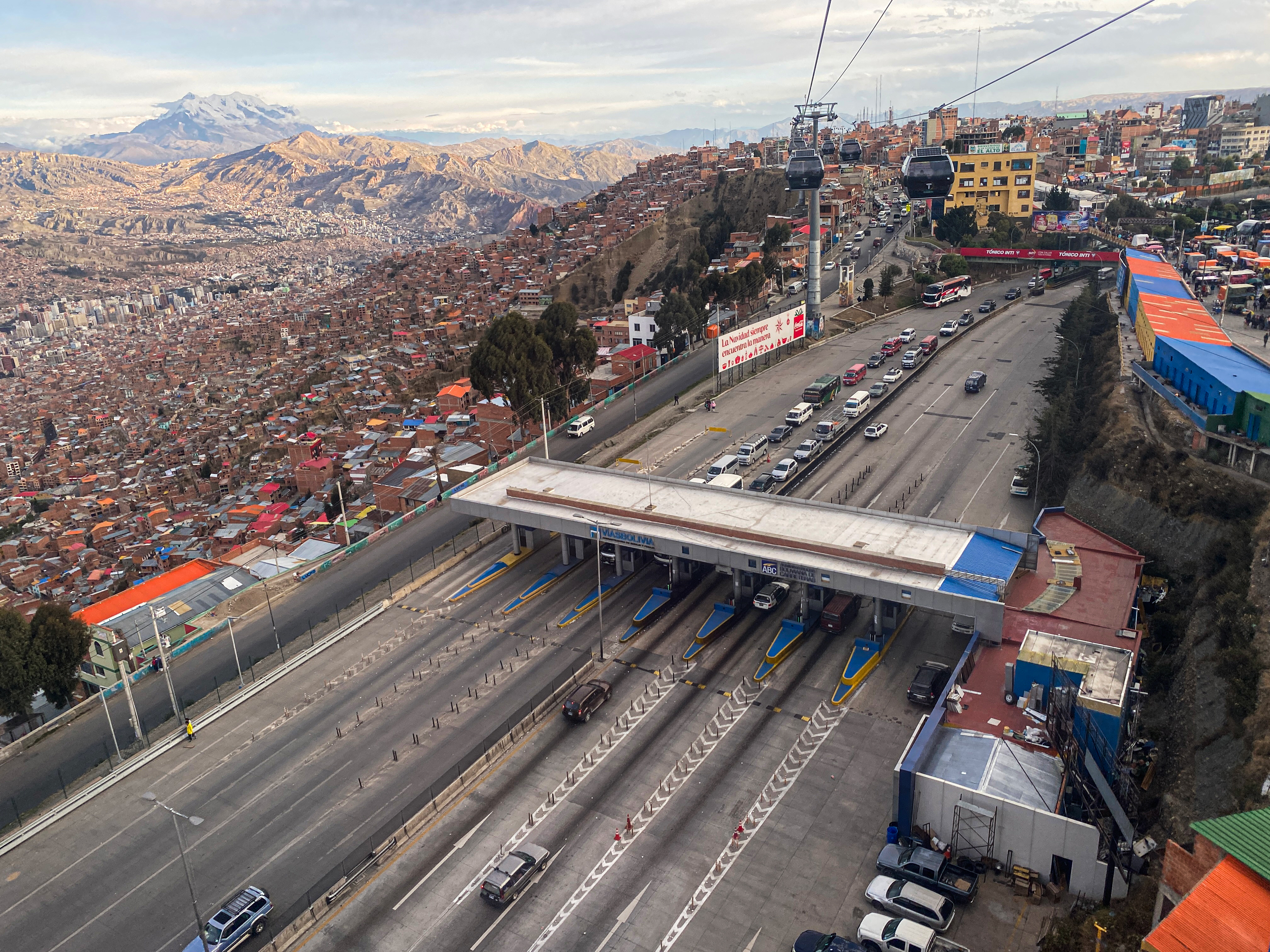
La Paz—El Alto highway

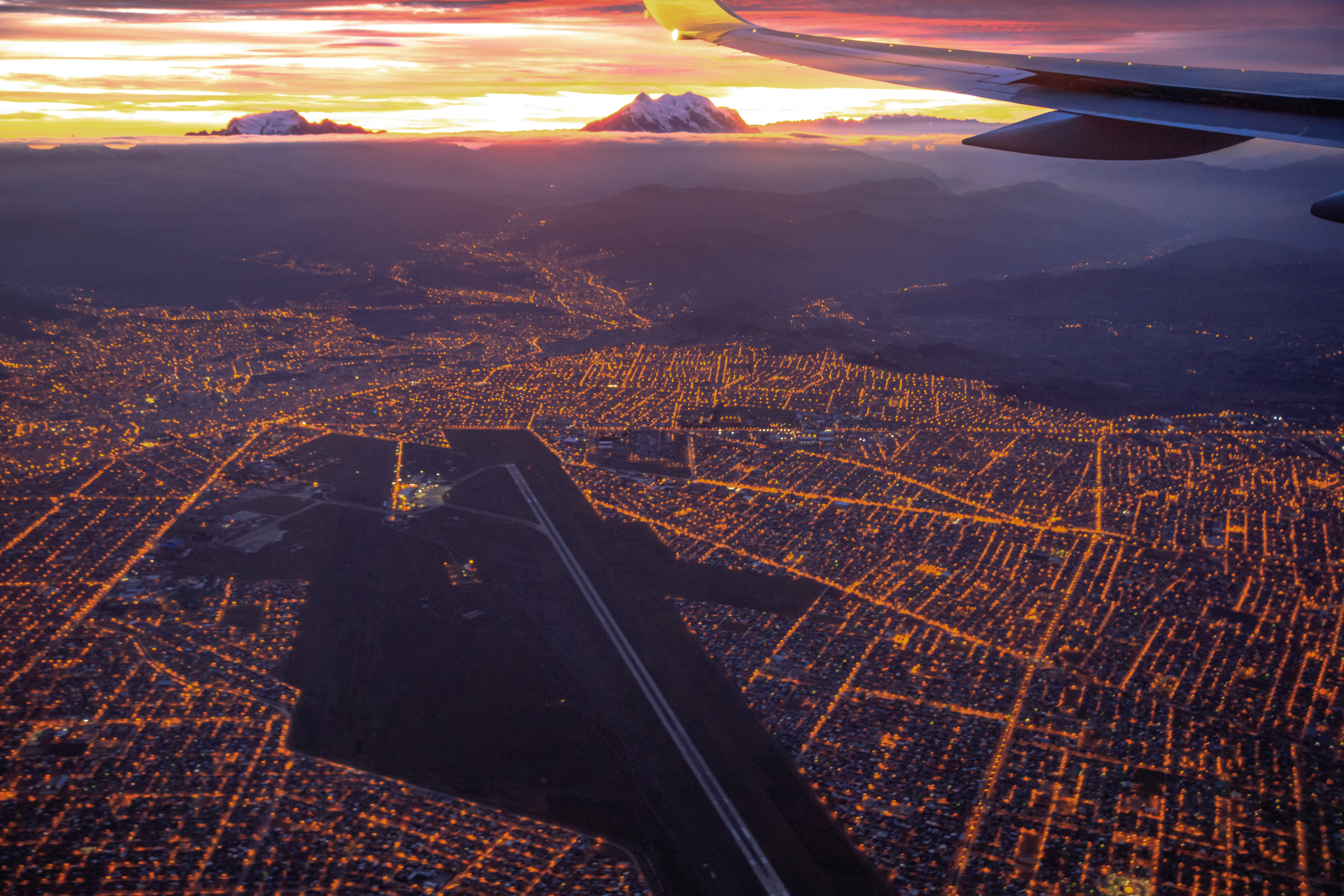
El Alto International Airport

== Government ==
El Alto is a municipality within the province of Murillo. The government of the city is divided into the executive and legislative branches. The mayor of El Alto is the head of the city government, elected for a term of five years by general election. The legislative branch consists of the municipal council, which elects a president, vice president, and secretary from a group of 11 members.

The previous mayor was Monica Eva Copa, who defeated MÁS candidate Zacarias Maquera in March 2021 after being ousted by the El Alto party. The Government of El Alto faces competition in providing public services, security and participation with the grassroots and highly successful Fejuve movement.

On 4 May 2026, Eva Copa was succeeded by Eliser Roca as mayor of El Alto.

== Transportation ==
El Alto is connected to La Paz by three lines of the Mi Teleférico system. The city is connected to domestic and international destinations by El Alto International Airport.

== See also ==
- List of highest large cities in the world
