= 2026 Bolivian regional elections =

- 22 March 2026 (first round); 19 April 2026 (runoff)

Governors, mayors, councillors, and regional assemblies in all 9 departments of Bolivia and their municipalities
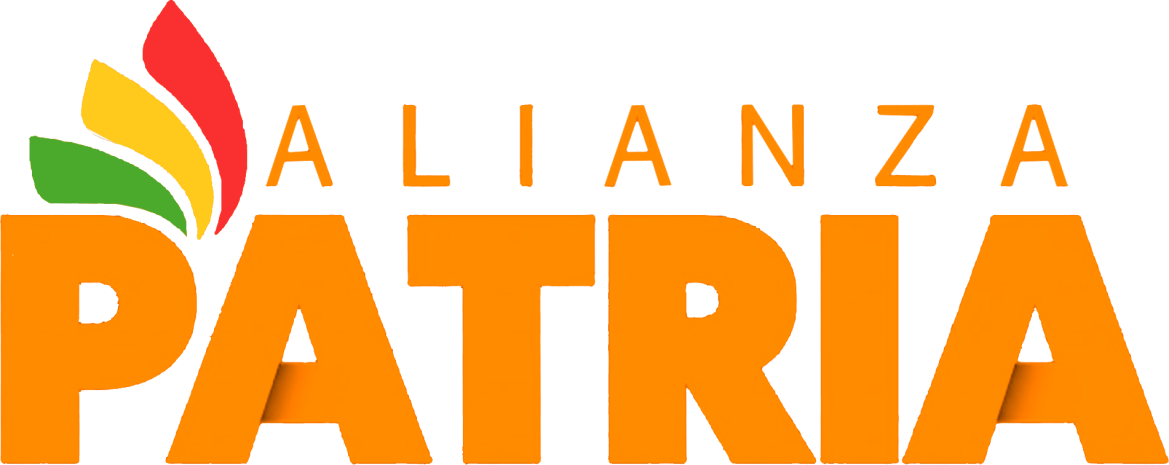

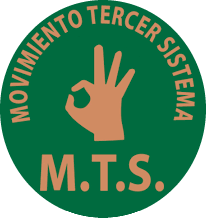

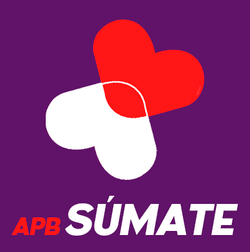
	Majority party	Minority party	Third party
Party	Alianza Patria	Libre	Alianza Unidos Por los Pueblos
Alliance	Many groups (Note: Coalition consisting of Primero la Gente (Bolivia), Creemos, National Unity Front, MIR-NM, SOL.bo Tarija, Todos in Tarija and Primero Pando))		MAS-IPSP; EVO Pueblo
Last election	New	New	3 governors 240 mayors (Note: Movement to Socialism)
Seats won	2 governors 36 mayors	2 governors 16 mayors	1 governor 12 mayors
Seat change	▲2 ▲36	▲2 ▲16	▼2 ▼230
	Fourth party	Fifth party	Sixth party
Party	Movimiento Tercer Sistema (Bolivia)	APB Súmate	Nueva Generación Patriótica
Alliance		None	None
Last election	2 governor 10 mayors	0 governors 1 mayor	New
Seats won	1 governors 36 mayors	0 governors 6 mayors	0 governors 23 mayors
Seat change	▼1 ▲25	0 ▲5	0 ▲23
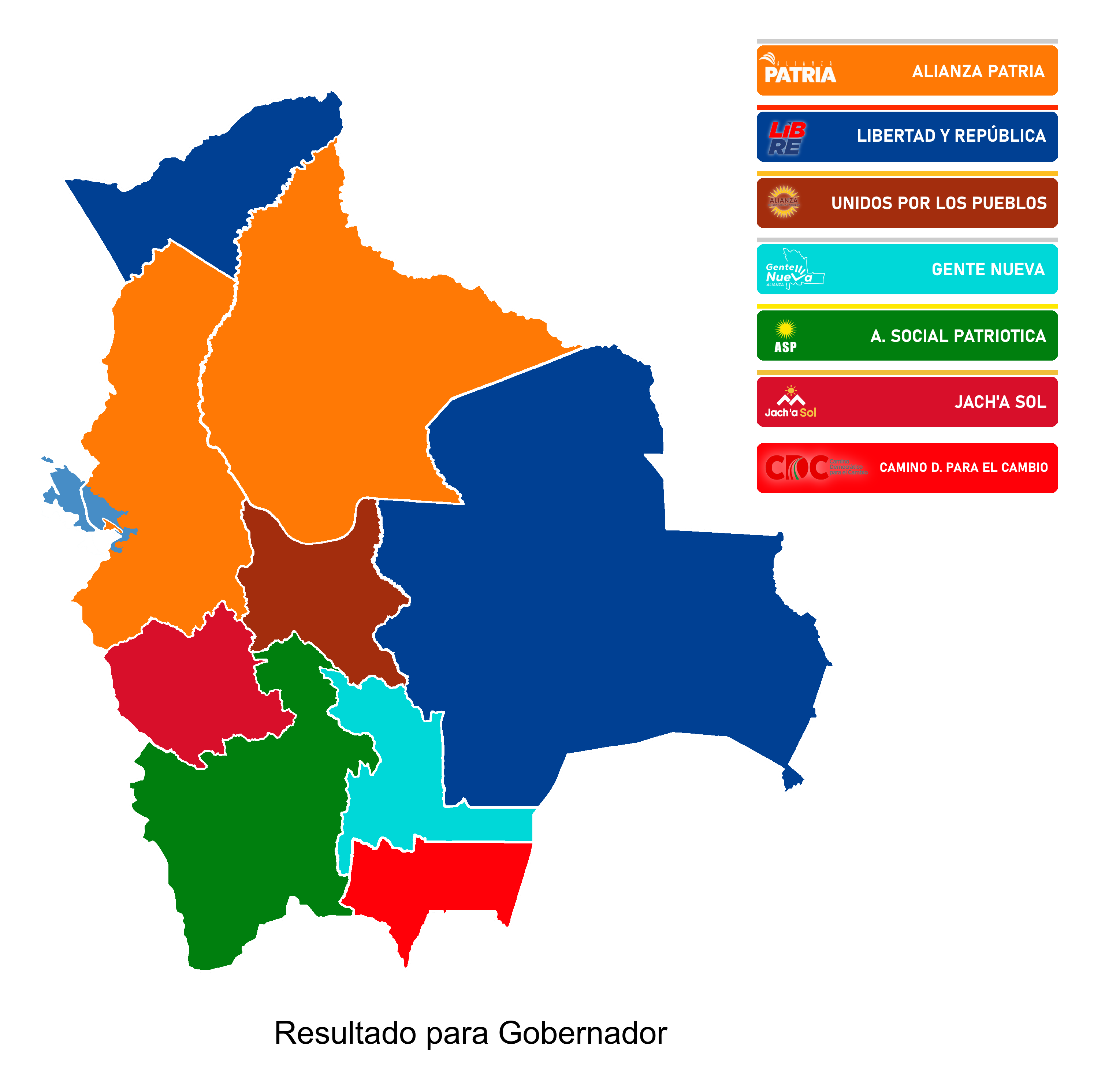
- Gubernatorial results by department

The 2026 Bolivian regional elections were held on 22 March 2026 to elect the nine governor and assembly members of the nine departments or regions, the vice-governors of the departments of Santa Cruz, Tarija, Pando and Beni, and the sub-governors and corregidores in the department of Beni. The 335 municipal governments (mayors) and 2,044 municipal councilors were also elected. Additionally, a Regional Executive and two development executives were elected in the Autonomous Regional Government of Gran Chaco, in the department of Tarija. A second round is scheduled for 19 April.

The assembly members from the nine departments will be elected as follows: 144 departmental assembly members by territory, 105 departmental assembly members by population, and 28 departmental assembly members representing the Indigenous and Native Peasant Nations and Peoples (NPIOC) and the Afro-Bolivian people. Six regional assembly members will also be elected by territory, three regional assembly members by population, and three regional assembly members representing Indigenous and Native Peasant peoples, along with their respective alternates, throughout the country.

In total, 4962 political authorities will be elected nationwide: 583 at the departmental level, 27 at the regional level, and 4352 at the municipal level, including both elected officials and alternates.

== Preparations ==
The call for departmental elections has been delayed by the holding of the general elections between August and October 2025, as well as the economic crisis in the country. On 9 October 2025, the Electoral Body submitted the draft law "Transitional Law for Holding Elections of Departmental, Regional, and Municipal Political Authorities" to the Plurinational Legislative Assembly for its consideration and subsequent approval, but the Committee of Deputies suspended its consideration due to the absence of its members. On October 27, the acting president of the Plurinational Electoral Organ (TSE), Óscar Hassenteufel, announced that the 2026 subnational elections would be called by mid-November and that the mass registration of new voters would take place from 1 to 10 December.

On 30 October, TSE member Gustavo Ávila requested that the new Bolivian parliament approve and enact the law submitted by the electoral body. He stressed that the law should be addressed immediately, since the constitutional term begins on November 8 and "there is no time for the usual organizational process".

On 20 November, the TSE launched the call for subnational elections for the 2026–2031 period. The resolution confirmed the date of said elections, to be held on March 22, 2026 in the nine departments of the country and in the 340 municipalities of Bolivia.

== Electoral system ==
At the departamental level, governors are elected by departmental constituency. If no candidate for governor obtains more than 50% of the valid votes cast, or a minimum of 40% with a 10% lead over the second-place candidate, a second round of voting will be held. In the departments of Pando, Santa Cruz, Tarija, and Beni, a vice-governor is elected, while in the department of Beni, eight sub-governors are elected. In the department of Tarija, there is the special case of the election of regional executives in the Gran Chaco Province.

== Authorized political organizations ==
=== Political parties ===
Candidacy	Party	Department								
Candidacy	Party	Chuquisaca	La Paz	Santa Cruz	Cochabamba	Tarija	Potosí	Oruro	Beni	Pando
	Acción Democrática Nacionalista (ADN)									
	Autonomía para Bolivia Súmate (APB Súmate)									
	Frente Revolucionario de Izquierda (FRI)									
	Movimiento al Socialismo (MAS-IPSP)									
	Movimiento Demócrata Social (Demócratas)									
	Movimiento de la Izquierda Revolucionaria (MIR-NM)									
	Movimiento Nacionalista Revolucionario (MNR)									
	Movimiento de Renovación Nacional (MORENA)									
	Third System Movement (MTS)									
	New Patriotic Generation (NGP)									
	Partido Demócrata Cristiano (PDC)									
	Liberty and Republic (LIBRE)									
	Unidad Cívica Solidaridad (UCS)									

=== Political alliances ===
Alianza	Siglas	Composición	Ámbito	Líder	Ref.
Somos LIBRE	LIBRE	List: Party: • LIB-RE; Citizen group: •Nuestros Éxitos Gobernando y Realizando Obras	Nacional	Jorge Quiroga Ramírez	
Unidos por los Pueblos	A-UPP	List: Partido: • MAS-IPSP; Agrupación ciudadana: • SOMOS Respaldo Político: •EVO Pueblo	Nacional		
Proyecto País	A.P.P.	List: Partido: • FRI; Agrupación ciudadana: • Proyecto Potosí	Nacional	Marco Antonio Pumari	
Unidad por la Patria	PATRIA	List: Partido: • MIR-NM • UN; Agrupación ciudadana: • PG	List: Departamentos: Chuquisaca, Cochabamba, Potosí and Santa Cruz (municipios)	Rodrigo Paz, Jaime Paz Zamora y Samuel Doria Medina	
Despierta		List: Partido: • Demócratas; Agrupación ciudadana: • BUSCO	Departamento del Beni		
Vamos por el Progreso		List: Partido: • ADN; Agrupación ciudadana: • VAMOS	Departamento del Beni		
Fuerza y Esperanza	TUFE	List: Partido: • FRI; Agrupación ciudadana: • Construyendo Futuro	Departamento del Beni		
Nueva República	NEO	List: Party: • ADN • Demócratas; Citizen group: • República 2025 • Todos por Camargo • Unidos para Renovar-Huacareta	Departamento de Chuquisaca	Horacio Poppe Inch	
Charcas Revolucionaria	CH.R	List: Partido: • MNR; Agrupación ciudadana: • CC	Departamento de Chuquisaca	Enrique Leaño	
Nueva Ideas	N.I	List: Partido: • UCS; Agrupación ciudadana: • PDP; Apoyo político: • NUIL	Departamento de Cochabamba	Roberto Perrogón	
Soluciones con Todos	S.C.T	List: Partido: • MNR; Agrupación ciudadana: • MIM	Departamento de Cochabamba	Mario Severich	
Primero El Alto		List: Partido: • ADN • UCS	El Alto (departamento de La Paz)	José Luis Paredes	
Patria	PATRIA	List: Partido: • MIR-NM (Unidad por la Patria) • UN (Unidad por la Patria); Agrupación ciudadana: • PG (Unidad por la Patria) • SOL.bo	La Paz (departamento de La Paz)	Luis Revilla	
Somos La Paz		List: Partido: • MNR; Agrupación ciudadana: • MIDELUR	Departamento de La Paz	Ingvar Ellefsen	
Patria SOL	PATRIA	List: Partido: • MIR-NM (Unidad por la Patria); Agrupación ciudadana: • PG (Unidad por la Patria) • SOL.bo	Departamento de La Paz	Luis Revilla	
Suma por el Bien Común		List: Partido: • Demócratas; Agrupación ciudadana: • Suma Escoma (SE)	Departamento de La Paz	Iván Arias	
Recuperemos La Paz		List: Partido: • ADN; Agrupación ciudadana: • Licoma Por Siempre	Departamento de La Paz		
Renovación 2026		List: Party: • ADN; Naciones y Pueblos Indígena Originario Campesinos: • Siete Ayllus Marca Challapata • Jach'a Marca Tapakarí Cóndor Challapata	Departamento de Oruro		
Somos Oruro		List: Partido: • Demócratas; Agrupación ciudadana: • AYNI • NUIL	Departamento de Oruro		
Patria	PATRIA	List: Partido: • MIR-NM (Unidad por la Patria); Agrupación ciudadana: • PG (Unidad por la Patria)	Departamento de Oruro		
Libre Pando		List: Partido: • LIB-RE; Agrupación ciudadana: • Columna de Integración (CI)	Departamento de Pando		
Unidad por la Patria-Primero Pando	PATRIA	List: Partido: • MIR-NM (Unidad por la Patria) • UN (Unidad por la Patria); Agrupación ciudadana: • PG (Unidad por la Patria) • Primero Pando	Departamento de Pando		
Unidos	UNIDOS	List: Partido: • Demócratas; Agrupación ciudadana: • Pueblo Unido	Pasorapa (departamento de Cochabamba)	Esther Soria Rocío Molina	
SAO-ADN	SAO-ADN	List: Partido: • ADN; Agrupación ciudadana: • SAO	Departamento de Santa Cruz	Juan Carlos Medrano Víctor Hugo Núñez del Prado	
Primero Santa Cruz		List: Partido: • FRI • MNR	Departamento de Santa Cruz	José Gary Áñez	
Libre		List: Partido: • LIB-RE; Agrupación ciudadana: • NPC	Departamento de Santa Cruz	Juan Pablo Velasco Jorge Quiroga Ramírez	
Creemos Patria	PATRIA	List: Partido: • MIR-NM (Unidad por la Patria) • UN (Unidad por la Patria); Agrupación ciudadana: • PG (Unidad por la Patria) • Creemos	Departamento de Santa Cruz	Luis Fernando Camacho	
Primero Tarija		List: Partido: • MNR; Agrupación ciudadana: • NASUR (facción)	Departamento de Tarija	Johnny Torres	
Unidad por la Patria	PATRIA	List: Partido: • MIR-NM (Unidad por la Patria) • UN (Unidad por la Patria) • FRI; Agrupación ciudadana: • PG (Unidad por la Patria) • Todos	Departamento de Tarija	Adrián Oliva Alcázar	

=== Citizen and indigenous groups ===
La Paz
Alianza Social Patriótica	A.S.P.
Ciudad Humana	C.H.
Juntos Al Llamado de Los Pueblos	J.A.LLA.LLA.L.P.
Mirando el Desarrollo de Luribay	MIDELUR
Movimiento por la Soberanía	M.P.S.
Movimiento Tierra y Libertad	M.T.L.
Movimiento Yungas Productivo	M.Y.P.
Nueva Opción Social	N.O.S.
Proyecto Alternativo de Cambio Hacia un Amanecer	P.A.C.H.A.
Poder de los Pueblos Originarios	PODER-O
Por Un Municipio Alternativo	P.U.M.A.
Soberanía y Libertad para Bolivia	SOL.bo
SOMOS Movimiento Social	SOMOS
Suma Escoma	S.E.
Unión por el Cambio	U.P.C.
Venceremos	VENCEREMOS

Chuquisaca
Asociación de Comunidades Originarias e Indígenas de Poroma	ASOCOIN
Charcas	C.C.
Consejo de Caciques Marka Payaqullu (NPIOC)	COKASAL
Faro de Unión con Empoderamiento y Representación Zonal Autonómica	FUERZA
Libertad y Democracia Renovadora	LIDER
Movimiento Multicultural Productivo	M.M.P.
Pacto de Integración Social	P.A.I.S.
Por Siempre Chuquisaca	XS-CH
República 2025	R2025
San Lucas y la Capitanía Zona Macharetí (NPIOC)	CZM-APG
Todos por Camargo	TPC
Unidos para Renovar-Huacareta	UNIR
Unidos para Renovar-Villa Vaca Guzmán	UNIR

Cochabamba
Agrupación de Renovación Independiente	A.R.I.
Cambio y Renovación	CREE
Frente Amplio Patriótico	F.A.P.
Fuerza Social	F.S.
Gualberto Villarroel	G.V.
Proyecto Progresista Social	P.P.S.
Pueblo Originario Kirkiawi (NPIOC)	POKUY
Renovación Total	RETO
Tarata Unida	TU
Unidad Nacional de Esperanza	UNE
Unidos Por Aiquile	UNPA
Unidos por Cliza	U.P.C.

Oruro
Ayllu Jilanko Tayaquira (NPIOC)	IO Tayaquira-MD
Ayllus y Nacionalidades con Identidad (NPIOC)	A.Y.N.I.
Cuerpo de Autoridades Originarias Saucari (NPIOC)	CAO-S
Lucha Estratégica de Acción Local	LEAL
Federación Sindical Originaria Regional de Caracollo (NPIOC)	FERSORC
Movimiento Ciudadano San Felipe de Austria	MCSFA
Nación Originaria Jach’a Karangas (NPIOC)	N.O.J.K.
Nación Originaria Jatun Killacas Asanajaqui (NPIOC)	JAKISA
Participación Popular	P.P.
Sartayañani Utasa Marka Askichañapataqi	SUMA
Sol Oruro	SOL.ORURO
Unión QhamachA	U.Q.

Potosí
Alianza de Ayllus Originarios del Qullasuyo (NPIOC)	A.A.O.Q.
Alianza Social	A.S.
Asociación con Identidad de la Nación Indígena	A.I.N.I
Consejo de Ayllus Originarios Chaqui (NPIOC)	C.A.O.CH.
Consejo Originario de la Nación Chichas Wisijsa (NPIOC)	CONACH-W
Frente de Unidad Ciudadana	F.U.C.
Jatun Ayllu Parantaca (NPIOC)	Potosí-JAP
Jatun Ayllu Yura (NPIOC)	J.A.Y.
Movimiento Cívico Popular	M.C.P.
Partido Socialista Revolucionario	P.S.R.
Pueblo Unido	P.U.
Somos Potosí	S.P.

Beni
Beni Un Solo Corazón	BUSCO
Central de Pueblos Étnicos Mojeños del Beni	CPEM-B
Construyendo Futuro	C.F.
Fuerza Social Demócrata	F.S.D.
Orden y Desarrollo Amazónico	AVANZAR
Vanguardia Movilización Social	VAMOS

Pando
Auténtica Alianza Gonzaleña y Pandina	AAGyP
Columna de Integración	C.I.
Movimiento Democrático Autonomista	M.D.A.
Primero Pando	P.P.

Tarija
Alianza de Integración Regional	A.I.R.
Camino Democrático para el Cambio	C.D.C.
Consejo de Capitanes Guaraní de Tarija (NPIOC)	C.C.G.T.
Frente Agropecuario Unido	F.A.U.
Integración Seguridad y Autonomía	I.S.A.
Madre Tierra	M.T.
Movimiento Autonomista de Trabajo y Esperanza	MATE
Nueva Alianza Sur	NASUR
Primero la Gente	P.G.
Somos Chaco	SOMOS CHACO
Todos	TODOS
Unidos para Renovar	UNIR

Santa Cruz
Agrupación de Propuesta Ciudadana	A.P.C.
Alianza Solidaria Popular	ASIP
Cambio Posible	CAMPO
Creemos	CREEMOS
Fuerza y Esperanza	FE
Guarayos Hoy	G.H.
Integrando a Pailón y sus Comunidades	IPC
Jichi Compromiso Ciudadano	P.C.
Juntos Somos Portachuelo	JSP
Libertad y Democracia Renovadora	LIDER
Libertad, Renovación y Solidaridad	LIBRES
Matieños de Corazón	MATICO
Modernidad Nacional	M.N.
Movimiento Solidario Popular	M.S.P.
Nuevo Poder Ciudadano	N.P.C.
Paz y Progreso	P.P.
Primero Conce	P.C.
Santa Cruz Autónoma y Ordenada	SAO
Seguridad, Orden y Libertad	SOL
Somos Warnes	
Todos Por Porongo	TPP
Todos por Roboré	T.P.R.
Unidad, Democracia y Oportunidad Social	UNIDOS
Un Nuevo Instrumento Revolucionario	UNIR.bo
Vallegrande Para Todos	V.P.T.
Voluntad Ciudadana y Equidad Socia	VOCES
Vos	VOS

== Electoral organization and timetable ==
Electoral calendar for the subnational elections of 22 March 2026
Year	Date	Event
2025	November 20	Call for subnational elections 2026
2025	November 26	Approval of the electoral calendar
2025	December 1-10	Appointment of electoral judges
2025	December 1-15	Registration of organizations of Indigenous and peasant Nations and peoples before the TEDs
2025	December 4-16	Mass biometric registration
2025	December 12-15	Register of political alliances
2025	December 17-22	Registration of candidates
2025	December 22, 2025 to March 18, 2026	Dissemination of electoral propaganda at public campaign events
2025	December 23, 2025 to February 5, 2026	Replacement due to withdrawal of candidacies
2026	January 3	TED review report of nominations
2026	January 9	Publication of candidate lists
2026	January 16	Ballot placement draw
2026	January 21	Ballot design approval
2026	February 20	Drawing of electoral jurors
2026	March 22	Bolivian subnational elections of 2026
2026	April 19	Second round

== Departmental elections for governors ==
=== Beni Department ===
2026 Beni election
- 22 March 2026
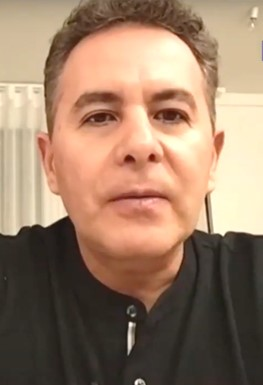
Candidate	30835	Jesús Egüez Rivero	Alejandro Unzueta
Party	Primero la Gente
Percentage	13.74	15.94
Candidate	Miguel Ángel Rivero	Hugo Vargas Roca
Party	Movimiento de Izquierda Revolucionaria-Nueva Mayoría
Percentage	4.35	30.12
Candidate	Casta Karina Salinas
Party	Ind.
Percentage	35.56

The incumbent governor, Alejandro Unzueta, was nominated under the alliance "El Beni se Desarrolla Hoy" (Beni Develops Today), made up of the Social Democratic Movement and the citizens' group "Beni Un Solo Corazón" (Beni One Heart). The Patria Alliance formally nominated Jesús Egüez Rivero as its gubernatorial candidate, while the Unidos Por los Pueblos (United for the People) Alliance nominated Mario Alberto Almeida as its candidate. Other gubernatorial candidates include Hugo Vargas Roca of the Revolutionary Nationalist Movement, Karina Casta of the Third System Movement, and Luis Rowers of the Patriotic New Generation,

Candidacy (parties, groups and alliances)	Candidates	Result of the first round		2nd round result		Ref.
Candidacy (parties, groups and alliances)	Candidates	Votes (%)	Votes	Votes (%)	Votes	Ref.
Unidad por la Patria List: * Movimiento de la Izquierda Revolucionaria-Nueva Mayoría (MIR-NM); Primero la Gente (PG)	Jesús Egüez Rivero	36.56 %				
Movimiento Nacionalista Revolucionario	Hugo Vargas Roca	20.12 %				
Despierta El Beni se Desarrolla Hoy List: * Movimiento Demócrata Social (Demócratas); Beni Un Solo Corazón (Busco)	Alejandro Unzueta	15.94 %				
Transformación Unidad Fuerza y Esperanza	Miguel Ángel Rivero	13.74 %				
Movimiento Tercer Sistema	Casta Karina Salinas	4.35 %	8 408			
CPEM-B Central de Pueblos Étnicos Mojeños del Beni List: * Nuevas Ideas con Libertad (NUIL)	Consuelo Núñez Molina	3.64 %	7 048			
Unidos por los Pueblos List: * Movimiento al Socialismo (MAS-IPSP); Somos Movimiento Social (SOMOS); EVO Pueblo (respaldo; facción)	Mario Alberto Almeida	3.52 %	6 818			
Nueva Generación Patriótica	Luis Rowers Perdriel	2.14 %	4 134			
Valid votes		82.35%	193,473			
Blank and invalid votes		17.65%	41,478			
Electorate		100.00%	234,951	100.00%		
Registered voters		81.19%	289,397			
Fuente: Órgano Electoral Plurinacional | Atlas Electoral

== Municipal elections ==
The following table lists the partisan control of the main cities and departmental capitals of Bolivia. The change of leadership of a political organization is highlighted by the colour of that party.

City	Mayor	Political party	Mayor-Elect	Political party
Santa Cruz de la Sierra	Jhonny Fernández	Unidad Cívica Solidaridad (UCS)	Manuel Saavedra	Vos (VOS)
El Alto	Eva Copa	Movimiento de Renovación Nacional (Morena)	Eliser Roca	Unión por el Cambio (UPC)
La Paz	Iván Arias Durán	Suma Por el Bien Común (SPBC)	César Dockweiler	Innovación Humana (IH)
Cochabamba	Manfred Reyes Villa	Sumate	Manfred Reyes Villa	Autonomía Para Bolivia - Sumate (APB - SUMATE)
Oruro	Adhemar Wilcarani Morales	Movimiento al Socialismo (MAS - IPSP)	Iván Quispe Gutiérrez	Nueva Generación Patriótica (NGP)
Sucre	Enrique Leaño Palenque	Movimiento al Socialismo (MAS - IPSP)	Fátima Tardío	Alianza Gente Nueva (AGN)
Potosí	Alejandra Sivila Fuentes	Movimiento de Organización Popular (MOP)	Williams Roger Cervantes	Movimiento Tercer Sistema (MTS)
Tarija	Johnny Torres Terzo.	UNIDOS	Johnny Torres Terzo.	Primero Tarija
Trinidad	Cristhian Cámara Arratia	Movimiento Tercer Sistema (MTS)	Mauricio Barba	Unidad por la Patria (PATRIA)
Cobija	Ana Lucía Reis Melena	Movimiento Tercer Sistema (MTS)	Diego Armando Suárez Viana	Libre Pando (LIBRE)

== See also ==
- 2025 Bolivian general election
- 2021 Bolivian regional elections
- Bolivian judicial crisis (2024-2025)
