= Edmand Lara =

Bolivian politician and activist (born 1985)

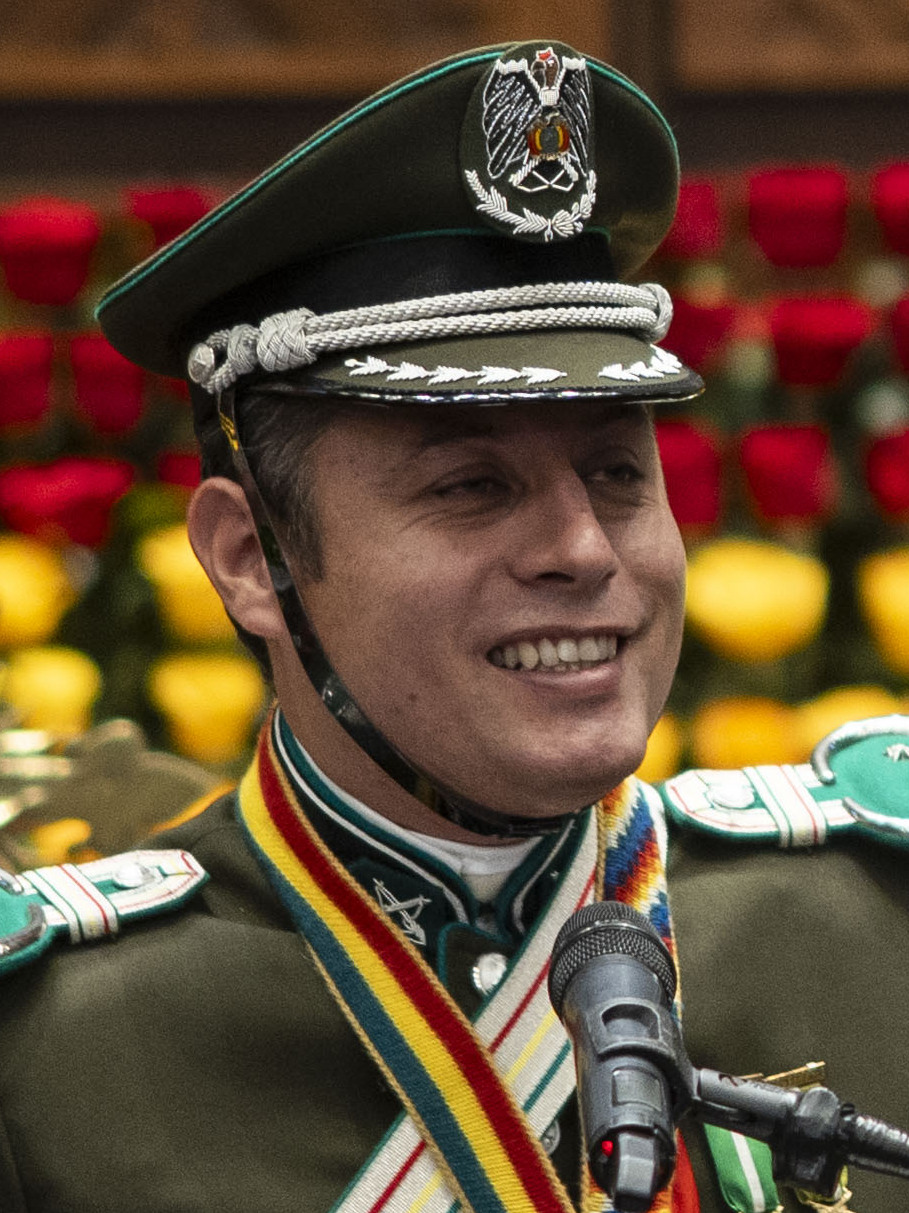
- Lara in 2025

40th Vice President of Bolivia
- Incumbent
- Assumed office 8 November 2025
- President: Rodrigo Paz
- Preceded by: David Choquehuanca

Personal details
- Born: 16 October 1985 (age 40) Villa Rivero, Cochabamba, Bolivia
- Party: PDC
- Spouse: Diana Romero Saavedra
- Education: National Academy; Bolivarian Union University
- Profession: Politician, activist, police officer (formerly)
- Police Career
- Department: Bolivian National Police
- Service years: 2007–2023
- Rank: Police Captain

Edmand Lara Montaño (Note: In this Spanish name, the first or paternal surname is Lara and the second or maternal family name is Montaño. Lara's given name Edmand is often misrendered as Edman.) (born 16 October 1985) is a Bolivian politician, lawyer, activist, and former police officer who is the 40th and current vice president of Bolivia since 2025, following the Bolivian general election.

Lara served for 15 years in the Bolivian National Police, rising to the rank of captain, until he was arrested and dismissed after reporting an extortion attempt against him by senior officers, as well as cases of corruption involving other members of the force. This episode led him to become an activist against police corruption, and the public notoriety he gained from his activism propelled his entry into politics.

== Early life and education ==
Lara Montaño was born in Villa Rivero, in the department of Cochabamba, but he relocated to Santa Cruz de la Sierra for family reasons. He graduated from the National Police Academy in 2007 and he earned a distance-learning law degree from the Bolivarian Union University in La Paz in 2024.

== Police career ==
=== Controversies and accusations in the National Police ===
In August 2022, Lara reported Col. Jhonny Ortuño, head of criminal records at the Santa Cruz Traffic Unit, who he alleged was charging money for issuing documents to members of the public. Ortuño was subsequently dismissed and subjected to disciplinary proceedings. In September of that year, Lara lodged another disciplinary complaint, against Sgt. Maribel Huayllani Silvestre, then assigned to the Victim Protection Directorate in Santa Cruz. Lara alleged that Huayllani had extorted a civilian in the municipality of Warnes, falsely accusing him of stealing a vehicle and demanding 4,000 bolivianos to shelve the case. On 21 March 2023, Lara publicly denounced the involvement of two officers in a robbery. Hours later, one of those involved was arrested and the other fled.

=== Arrest, disciplinary proceedings and dismissal ===
Six days after making those allegations, on 27 March 2023, he was arrested without prior notice by a group of seven police officers in a manner he described as "violent". The arrest was based on a complaint filed by Sgt. Huayllani, who accused him of usurpation of functions. The arresting officers later opened a second case for obstruction of justice, alleging that he had resisted arrest. Lara maintained that the charges were in retaliation for his corruption allegations.

On 28 March, he suffered a medical emergency during a precautionary measure hearing and, because of that, the hearing was adjourned. The Ombudsman's Office confirmed Lara's state of health and began monitoring his case.

When the hearing reconvened on 30 March, the Second Anti-Corruption Court of Santa Cruz decided to release him, with the imposition of non-custodial measures instead of preventive detention. Those measures included the obligation to report regularly to the Public Prosecutor's Office, a ban on leaving the country, and posting a surety bond. He was also prohibited from posting videos on TikTok. Non-custodial measures were also imposed in the second case against him.

On 13 December 2023, during a press conference at the Special Force to Fight Crime in Santa Cruz, he attempted to file a formal complaint against an officer for negligence in an assault case. Dressed in civilian clothes and accompanied by the victim, Lara approached Commander Erick Holguín to initiate the proceedings. This led to a physical altercation when Holguín grabbed Lara by the neck, wrestled with him and led him into an inner room, where he was temporarily detained. The incident, witnessed by the media, ended with Lara's release some hours later. Members of Congress from the Movement for Socialism (MAS), Civic Community (CC) and Creemos expressed their solidarity with Lara.

In August 2024, under article 93 of Law 101 on Police Disciplinary Regulations, he was dismissed from the Bolivian National Police, without the right to reinstatement, for "serious offences". After leaving the police, Lara went into business with his wife, selling clothes by the bundle in various local markets. While doing this, he pursued university studies and obtained a law degree.

== Activism and political career ==
Following his dismissal from the National Police, Lara maintained his public profile on social media, particularly TikTok, posting as Capitán Lara and continuing to denounce alleged irregularities and possible acts of corruption within the force.

=== 2025 Vice-presidential run ===
On 19 May 2025 – the deadline for registering candidacies with the Plurinational Electoral Organ – Senator Rodrigo Paz, the Christian Democratic Party's presidential candidate, named Lara as his running mate for the August general election, after his previous pick, Sebastián Careaga, left the ticket and threw his support behind Samuel Doria Medina of the Unity Bloc.

In the 17 August first round, the Christian Democratic formula achieved a surprise first-place victory with around 32% of the votes cast, and Paz and Lara faced the Libre alliance's Jorge Quiroga and Juan Pablo Velasco in a run-off on 19 October.

According to analyses by various media outlets, Lara's inclusion on the ballot was a determining factor in the PDC formula's first-round performance. The Associated Press said the campaign had gained an unexpected boost by including Lara, whom it described as a "a social media savvy ex-police captain with evangelical backing whose supporters see him as a bold leader willing to stand up to corruption". Similarly, Nueva Sociedad magazine described him as "the people's viral candidate", able to connect with broad sectors of the population through messages on TikTok about his day-to-day life and an intense campaign tour of the country alongside Paz that allowed him to consolidate a base of popular support.

Lara caused some controversy after the first round: he was accused of homophobia for using a gay slur against Jorge Quiroga in denouncing dirty tactics by the Libre campaign, and he was criticised by the National Association of Journalists for making "offensive, defamatory and threatening" statements against prominent journalists.

== Personal life ==
Lara is married to Diana Romero Saavedra, who was elected as a PDC proportional-representation deputy for Santa Cruz department in the 2025 election.

== Notes ==
Political offices
Preceded by David Choquehuanca	Vice President of Bolivia; 2025–present	Incumbent
Preceded by David Choquehuanca	President of the Plurinational; Legislative Assembly; 2020–2025	Incumbent
