= Social Democratic Movement =

Political party in Bolivia

Social Democratic Movement Movimiento Demócrata Social
- Abbreviation: MDS
- President: Ruben Costas Aguilera
- Founded: 15 December 2013; 12 years ago
- Preceded by: Popular Consensus
- Headquarters: Cochabamba
- Ideology: Liberal conservatism Federalism; Regionalism
- Political position: Right-wing to far-right
- National affiliation: Libre
- International affiliation: International Democracy Union
- Regional affiliation: Union of Latin American Parties; Christian Democrat Organization of America
- Colours: Green, white, yellow
- Chamber of Deputies: 17 / 130
- Senate: 3 / 36

Website
- democratas.bo

The Social Democratic Movement (Spanish: Movimiento Demócrata Social, MDS), often shortened to just the Democrats (Spanish: Demócratas), is a right-wing political party in Bolivia founded in 2013 for the movement for greater autonomy for the eastern departments of the Media Luna.

== History ==
Ruben Costas, governor of Santa Cruz department, announced the party's formation in March 2013. Twenty leaders gathered to launch the party in April 2013, including Costas, Beni governor Carmelo Lens and his predecessor Ernesto Suarez, Senator Bernard Gutierrez (PPB-Cochabamba), and Cochabamba council member Ninoska Lazarte. The launch was hosted by Savina Cuéllar, the former prefect of Chuquisaca Department, who as of April 2013, was under house arrest facing charges for the 24 May 2008, violence in Sucre.

After a failed petition to legally merge the registration of Costas' Truth and Social Democracy (VERDES) party, Renewing Freedom and Democracy (Libertad y Democracia Renovadora; Líder), and Popular Consensus in June, the Supreme Electoral Tribunal authorized Popular Consensus to rename itself the Social Democratic Movement in August 2013.

MDS participated in the 2014 election in alliance with the National Unity Front (UN), supporting the presidential candidacy of Samuel Doria Medina, electing 4 Deputies and one senator.

For the 2019 election, MDS and UN again joined to form the Bolivia Says No alliance, nominating Senator Óscar Ortiz as its presidential candidate. Within two weeks, the two parties split over internal disagreements, with MDS moving forward as the alliance's sole leader.

Party member and opposition Senator Jeanine Áñez became interim president of Bolivia in November 2019, following protests caused by alleged electoral fraud which led to the resignation of the government of Evo Morales. This move was contested by senators for the Movement for Socialism (MAS), Morales' party, who were majority in the assembly and were not in attendance, and thus stated that the vote for interim president took place without a quorum. However, the decision was upheld by the Plurinational Constitutional Court, which stated that it followed the succession mechanism stated in the Constitution of Bolivia.

Nevertheless, MAS maintains that Áñez's assumption to the presidency amounted to a coup d'état and in 2021, she was arrested under various charges relating to her assumption to the presidency.

== Election results ==
=== President ===
Election	Presidential nominee	Votes	%	Votes	%	Result
Election	Presidential nominee	First round		Second round		Result
2014	Samuel Doria Medina (UN)	1,253,288	24.23%			Lost ✗
2019	Óscar Ortiz Antelo	260,316	4.24%			Lost ✗
2020	Did not contest					
2025	Jorge Quiroga (Libre)	1,430,176	26.70%	2,881,972	45.11%	Lost ✗

=== Chamber of Deputies and Senate elections ===
Election	Party leader	Votes	%	Chamber seats	+/-	Position	Senate seats	+/-	Position	Status
2014	Ruben Costas Aguilera	As part of UD		32 / 130	New	▲2nd	9 / 36	New	▲2nd	Opposition
2019	Ruben Costas Aguilera	256,937	4.33%	4 / 130	▼28	▼4th	1 / 36	▼8	▼3rd	Annulled
2020	Did not contest			0 / 130	▼4	—N/a	0 / 36	▼1	—N/a	Extra-parliamentary
2025	Ruben Costas Aguilera	As part of Libre		39 / 130	▲39	▲2nd	12 / 36	▲12	▲2nd	Opposition
