= Unity (Bolivia) =

Unity Unidad
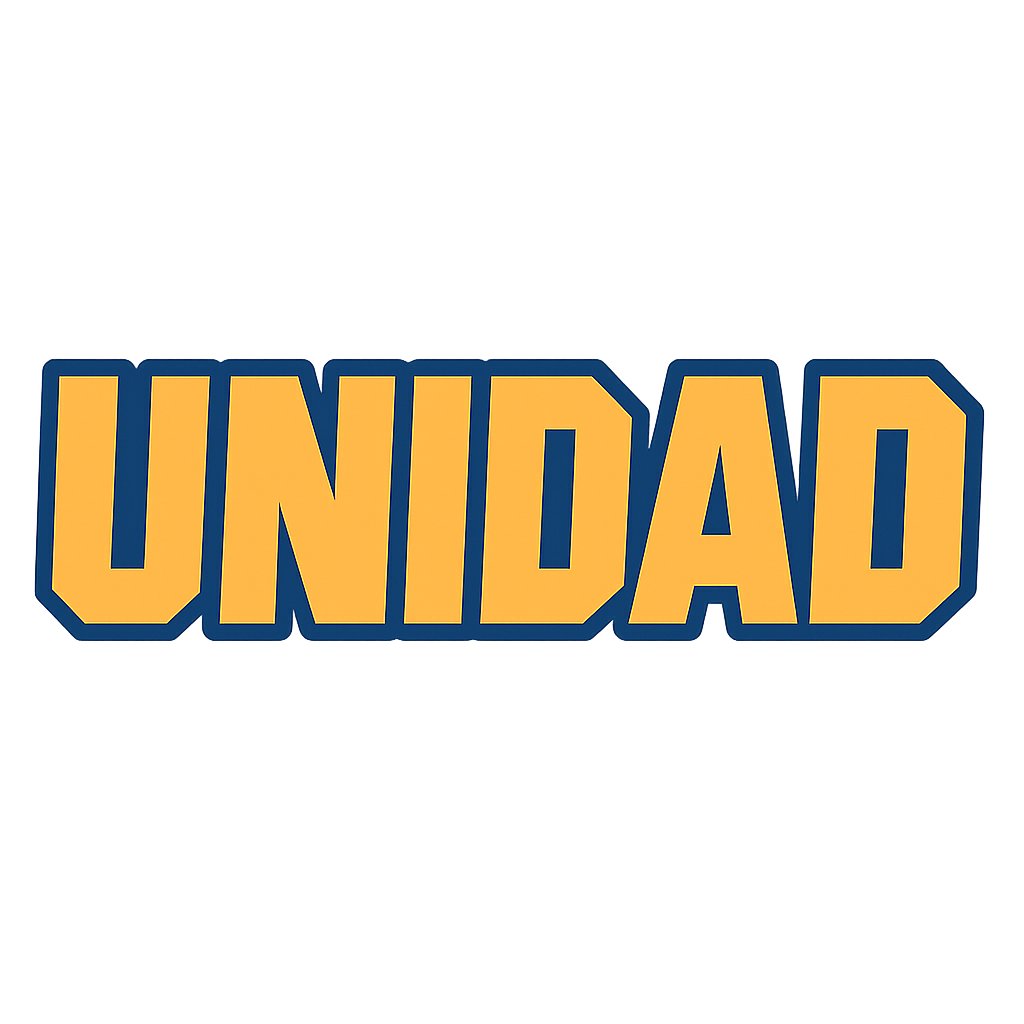
- Leader: Samuel Doria Medina
- Founded: 18 December 2024
- Legalized: 18 April 2025
- Ideology: Populism; Economic liberalism
- Political position: Centre-right to right-wing
- Colors: Yellow; Blue
- Slogan: ¡100 Días Carajo! ('100 days dammit!')
- Senate: 7 / 36
- Deputies: 27 / 130

The Unity Bloc (Spanish: Bloque de Unidad), is a Bolivian electoral coalition that was formed on 18 December 2024 under the name "Bloque de Unidad", with the aim of participating and defeating the ruling party in the 2025 Bolivian general election.

Initially this bloc was made up of four opposition pre-candidates, including Samuel Doria Medina, Jorge Quiroga, Carlos Mesa and Luis Fernando Camacho, with the aim of consolidating a single candidacy for the 2025 elections. To which other pre-candidates such as Amparo Ballivián, Vicente Cuellar, Juan Del Granado and Carlos Börth joined; however, due to internal disputes, some of these opposition leaders left the bloc, leaving only Samuel Doria Medina, Luis Fernando Camacho, Vicente Cuellar, Juan Del Granado, Carlos Börth and other politicians who would join later.

On 18 April 2025, the political alliance was officially registered with the Plurinational Electoral Organ under the name " Unity ", which is made up of National Unity Front (UN), Creemos, Cambio 25, Alianza Social Patriótica (ASP), Movimiento sin Miedo (MSM), Alianza por Bolivia Unida y Solidaria (Al-Bus), Jóvenes Kataristas, Mi Oruro del Alma, Vamos Bolivia and other political organizations.

== Background ==
Following the victory of Movimiento al Socialismo in the 2020 general elections, the idea of unifying the opposition vote became popular. This initiative was mostly disseminated by the alternative movement El Búnker-Tercera República of journalist Virginio Lema and lawyer Agustín Zambrana, with the main objective of presenting only one opposition candidate, chosen through primaries similar to the Venezuelan opposition primaries in 2023.

On 13 November 2024, six political groups joined forces to form a united opposition bloc called " Unity is Possible ". This bloc was made up of the political fronts: Cambio 25 of Vicente Cuellar; Una Bolivia de Otro Modo of Amparo Ballivián; El Búnker - Tercera República of Agustín Zambrana; Al-Bus, under the leadership of Carlos Börth ; Vanguardia, Libertad es Prosperidad of deputy Miguel Roca Sánchez; and the Bolivian Liberal Party, led by Antonio Saravia. Later, El Búnker would withdraw its candidate so as not to divide the opposition vote. On the other hand, the Vanguard, Liberty is Prosperity group of deputy Miguel Roca Sánchez and the Bolivian Liberal Party of Antonio Saravia would leave this bloc to form a new " liberal bloc " headed by Branko Marinkovic, although later this liberal bloc would dissolve with the resignation of Branko Marinkovic to his presidential candidacy in support of Jorge Quiroga.

== History ==
In response to calls from various sectors of the Bolivian population for the formation of a unity bloc to defeat the Movimiento al Socialismo in the 2025 elections, various candidates and opposition parties formed different alliances.

On 18 December 2024, Carlos Mesa announced the formation of the political alliance called " Bloque de Unidad " signed with Samuel Doria Medina, political leader of Unidad Nacional, Jorge Quiroga who had announced his official candidacy and his alliance with the Frente Revolucionario de Izquierda and Luis Fernando Camacho, leader of Creemos to present a united front for the general elections. After that, members of "Unidad es Posible" such as Vicente Cuellar, Juan Del Grando, Amparo Ballivián and Carlos Börth would join the latter bloc.

In January 2025, Carlos Börth withdrew his candidacy to support Jorge Quiroga and Samuel Doria Medina. Likewise, Carlos Mesa did the same, but maintained his support for the unity bloc, and was later assigned as spokesperson for the opposition alliance. On 8 March 2025, Vicente Cuellar withdrew as a pre-candidate and offered his support to Samuel Medina.

On 11 March 2025, Carlos Börth announced his support for Samuel Medina. Branko Marinkovic, who led another bloc called the " Liberal Bloc ", would withdraw his candidacy announcing his support for Jorge Quiroga, but without entering this unity bloc. Days after the poll by the "Unity Bloc" was announced, Luis Fernando Camacho declined his nomination, leaving Tuto Quiroga, Samuel Doria Medina and Amparo Ballivián as candidates.

After two strong factions emerged within this bloc, one supporting Samuel Medina and the other Jorge Quiroga, a series of disputes began within the bloc due to the lack of internal consensus to carry out a series of surveys to define the sole candidate, so Jorge Quiroga finally announced the registration of his Libre alliance independently, moving away from the opposition unity, later Carlos Mesa announced his resignation as spokesman for this union.

On 9 April 2025, Samuel Doria Medina was designated as the candidate of the Unity bloc. Later, on 18 April 2025, this alliance would be officially registered with the Plurinational Electoral Organ under the name "Unity".

=== Pre-candidates ===
Party	Pre-candidate	Political support		Notes
Party	Pre-candidate	Members of the Block	External Backup	Notes
Unidad Nacional	Samuel Doria Medina	Luis F. Camacho; Vicente Cuéllar; Juan del Granado; Carlos Börth	Andrea Barrientos; Luis Revilla; Augusto Oblitas; Toribia Lero	
Frente Revolucionario de Izquierda	Jorge Quiroga Ramírez		Branko Marinković; Rubén Costas; Ernesto Suárez; Guido Nayar; José Gary Añez; Germain Caballero; Desirée Bravo; Gualberto Cusi; Tomas Monasterio	
Comunidad Ciudadana	Carlos Mesa			On 24 January 2024, he announced that he would not run for president, but maintained his support for the unity bloc, and was later assigned as the spokesperson for the opposition alliance. On 9 April 2025, following the dispute between Samuel Doria Medina and Jorge Quiroga, he resigned from his position as spokesperson, considering the breach of the bloc's agreement.
Creemos	Luis Fernando Camacho			On 11 August 2024, he announced his resignation from his candidacy and expressed his support for whoever is selected as the bloc's sole candidate. Following the dispute between Samuel Doria Medina and Jorge Quiroga, and the latter's distancing himself, Camacho announced his support for Samuel Doria Medina as the bloc's sole candidate.
Cambio 25	Vicente Cuellar	Juan Del Granado		On 8 March 2025, he declined his candidacy, and together with his ally Juan Del Granado, he announced his support for Samuel Doria Medina.
Una Bolivia de Otro Modo	Amparo Ballivián			Following the dispute between Samuel Doria Medina and Jorge Quiroga, on 16 April 2025 he declined his candidacy and announced his distancing from the bloc.
Alianza por Bolivia Unida y Solidaria	Carlos Börth			After joining the bloc, he declined his candidacy and announced his support for Jorge Quiroga and Samuel Doria Medina, finally on 11 March 2025, he announced his support for the leadership of Samuel Doria Medina.

== Election results ==
=== Presidential elections ===
Election	Presidential nominee	Votes	%	Votes	%	Result
Election	Presidential nominee	First round		Second round		Result
2025	Samuel Doria Medina	1,054,568	19.69%			Lost ✗

=== Chamber of Deputies and Senate elections ===
Election	Party leader	Votes	%	Chamber seats	+/-	Position	Senate seats	+/-	Position	Status
2025	Samuel Doria Medina	1,039,426	19.85%	27 / 130	New	▲3rd	7 / 36	New	▲3rd	Government

== See also ==
- Alianza Libre
- Comunidad Ciudadana
- Creemos
- Unidad Demócrata
