= 2025 Bolivian general election =

- Presidential election
- 17 August 2025 (first round); 19 October 2025 (second round)
- Turnout: 86.95% (first round) ▼1.47pp 85.32% (second round) ▼1.63pp
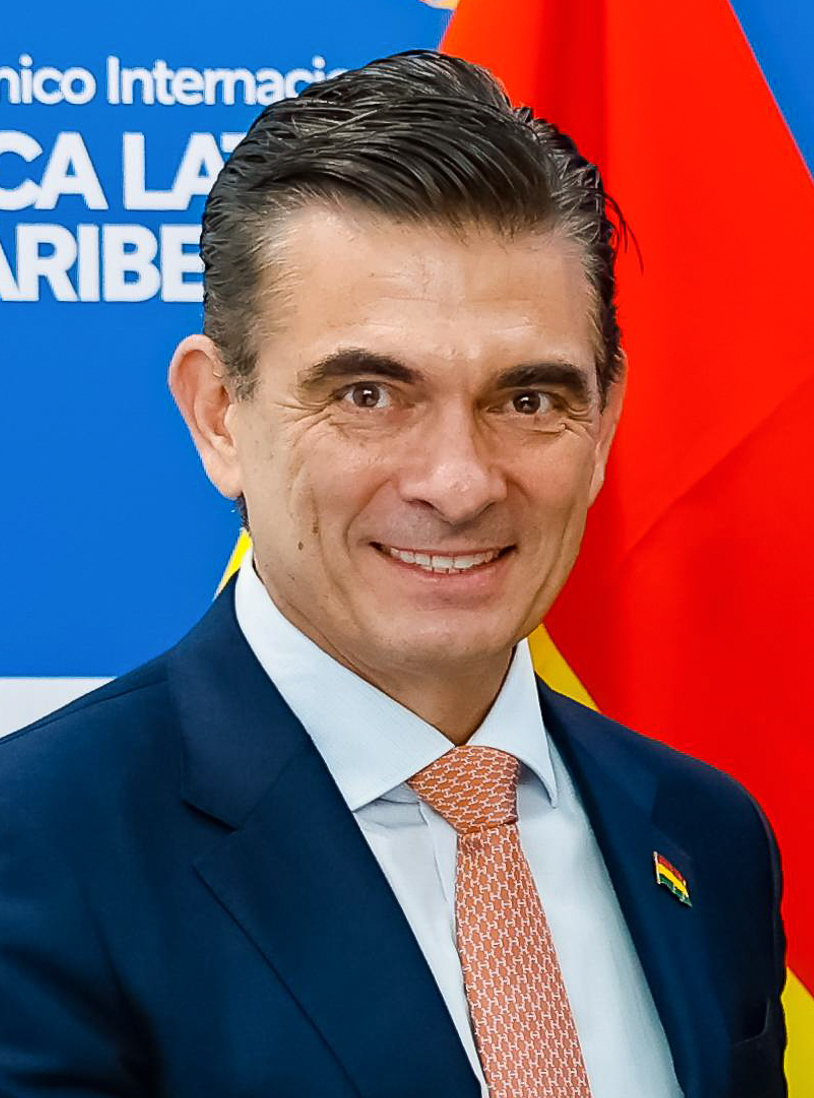

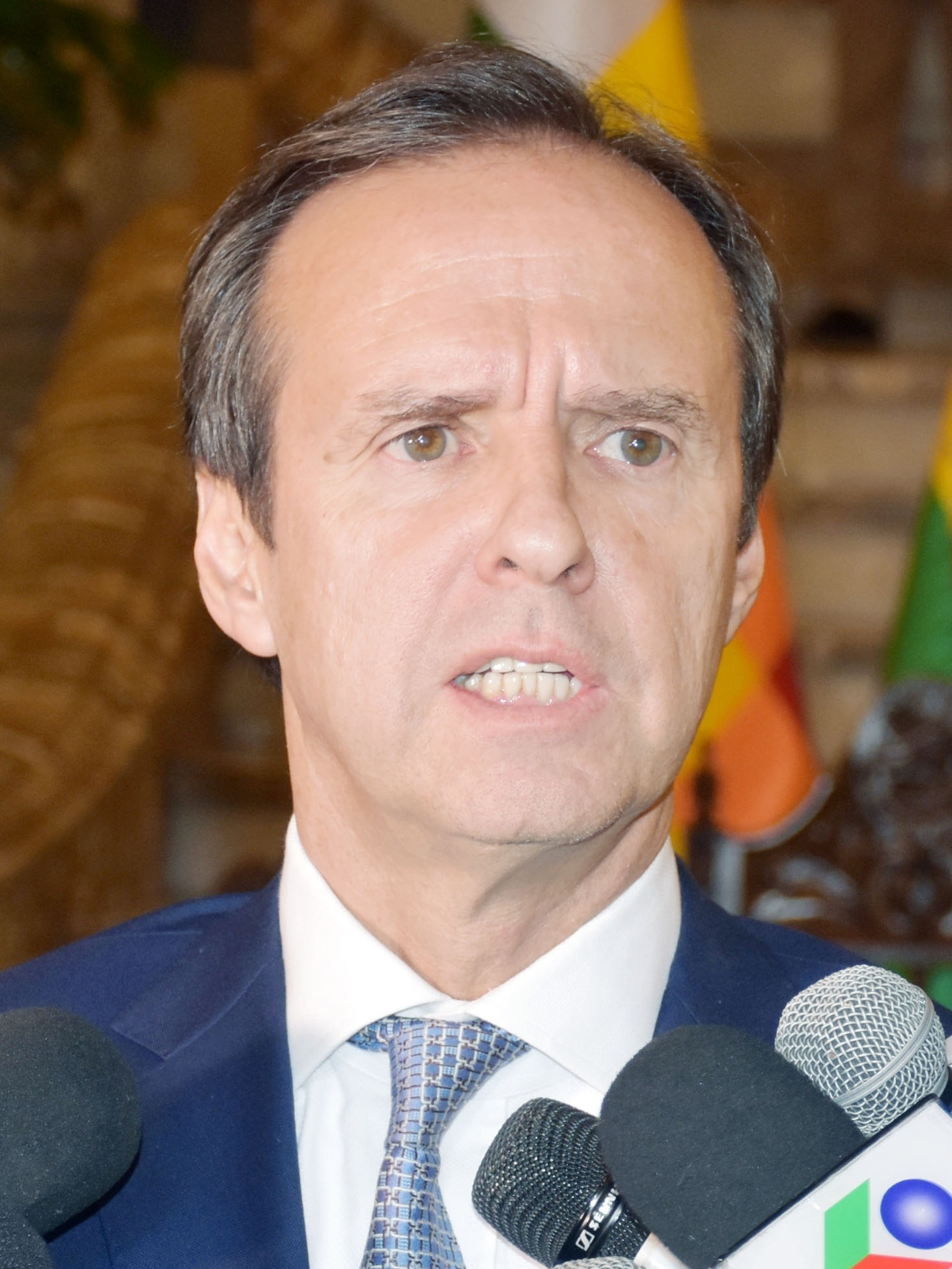
Nominee	Rodrigo Paz	Jorge Quiroga
Party	PDC	Independent
Alliance	–	Libre
Running mate	Edmand Lara	Juan Pablo Velasco
Popular vote	3,519,534	2,884,661
Percentage	54.96%	45.04%
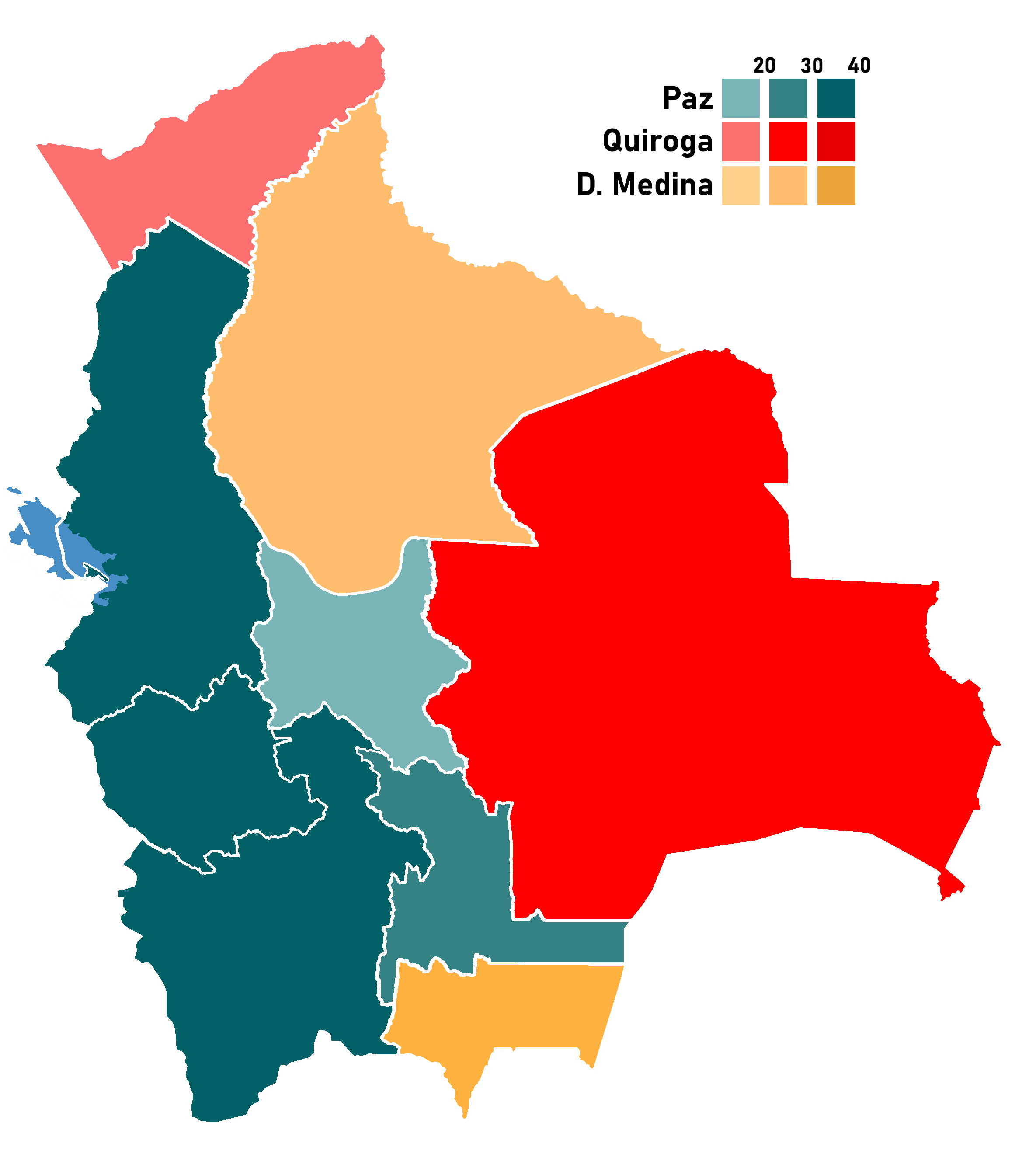
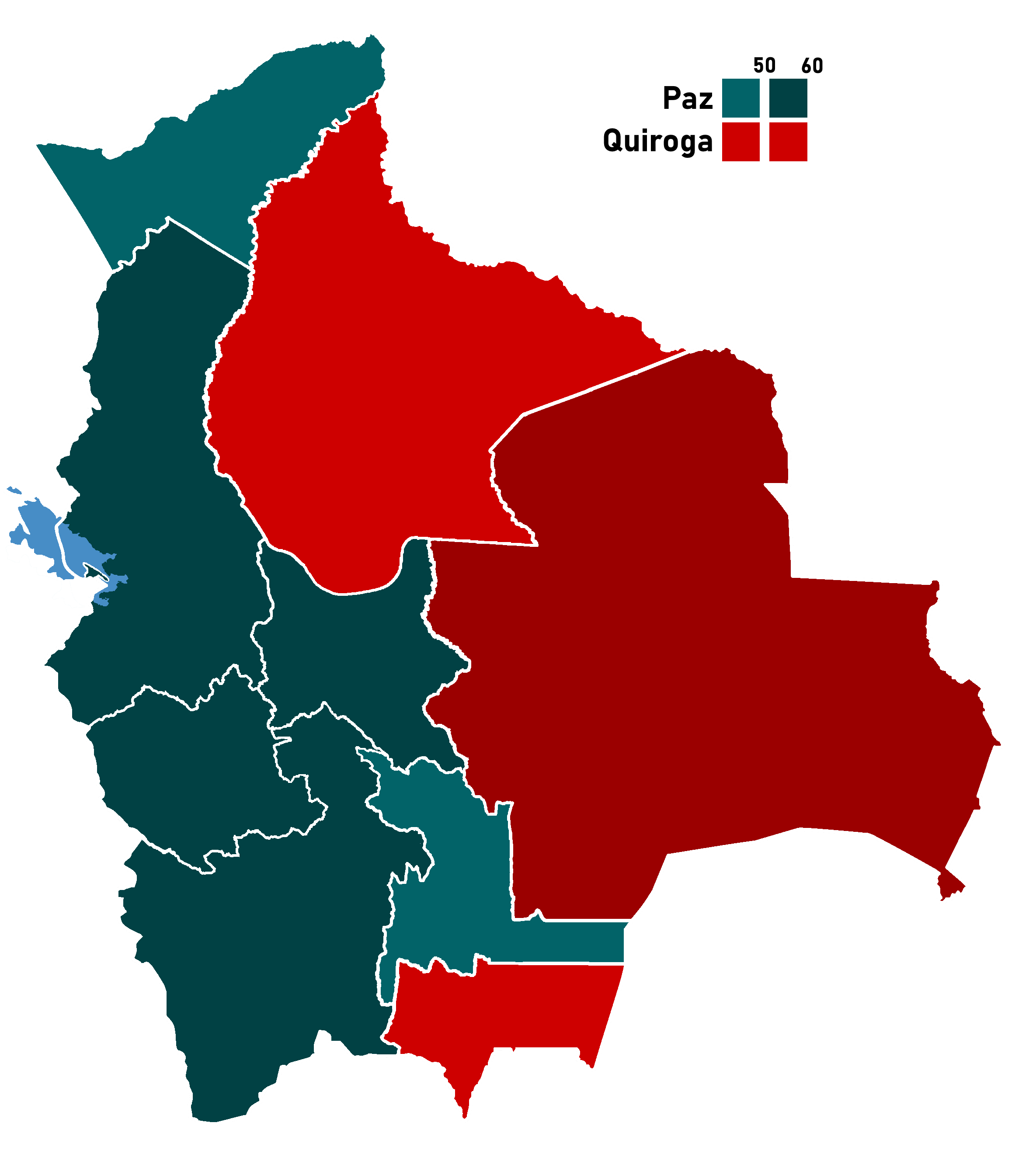
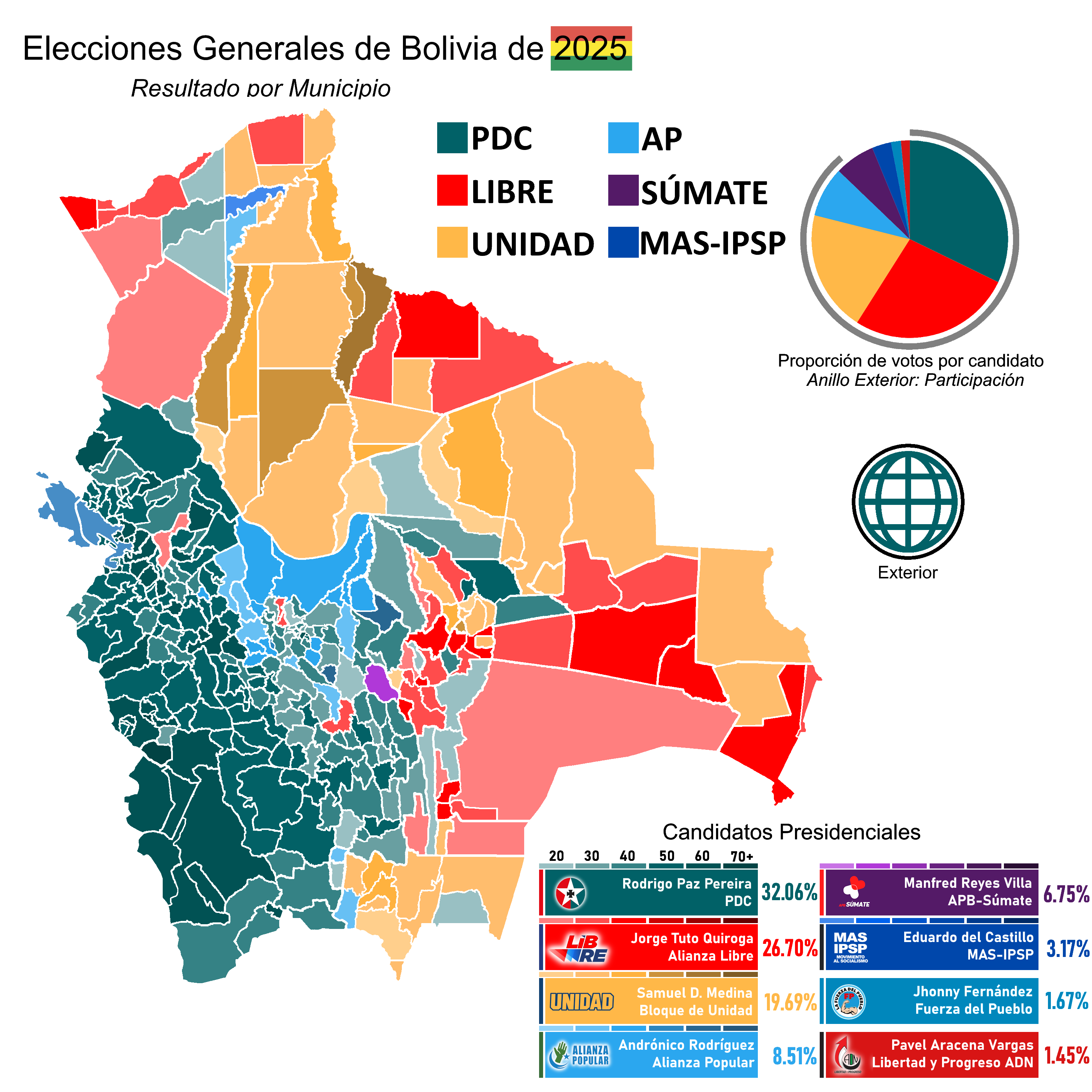
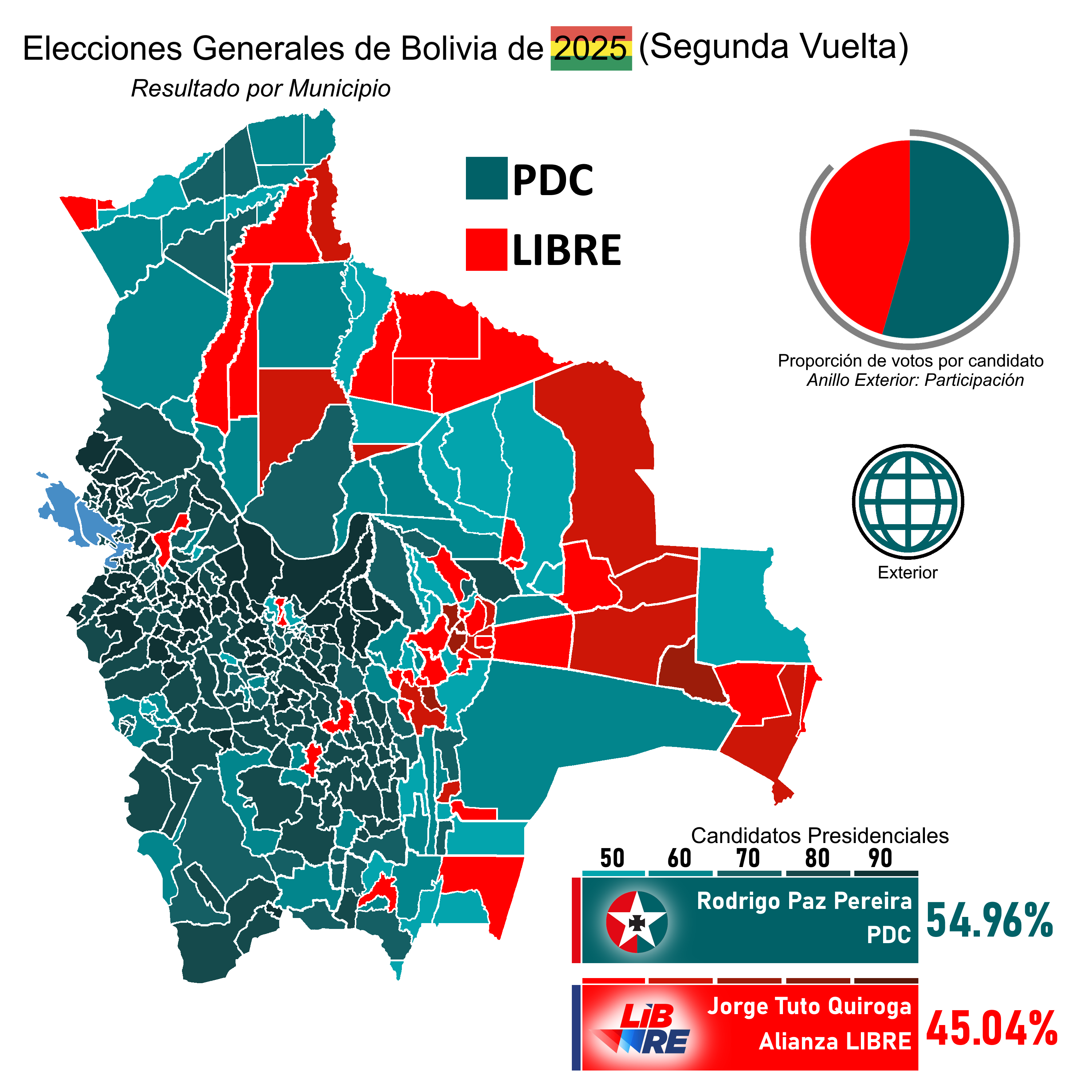
President before election
Luis Arce
MAS-IPSP
Elected President
Rodrigo Paz
PDC
- Chamber of Deputies
- 17 August 2025
- All 130 seats in the Chamber of Deputies; 66 seats needed for a majority
Party	Seats	+/–
PDC	49	
Libre	39	
Unity	26	New
AP	8	New
APB Súmate	5	New
MAS-IPSP	2	−73
BIA-YUQUI	1	+1
This lists parties that won seats. See the complete results below.
- Chamber of Senators
- 17 August 2025
- All 36 seats in the Chamber of Senators; 19 seats needed for a majority
Party	Vote %	Seats	+/–
PDC	32.15	16	
Libre	26.68	12	
Unity	19.85	7	New
APB Súmate	6.64	1	New
This lists parties that won seats. See the complete results below.

General elections were held in Bolivia on 17 August 2025 to elect the president, vice president, and all members of the Plurinational Legislative Assembly. Incumbent president Luis Arce of the ruling Movimiento al Socialismo (MAS-IPSP) did not seek reelection, amid internal party divisions and widespread dissatisfaction over shortages of essential goods. No candidate secured a majority in the presidential election, leading to a runoff on 19 October 2025 between Senator Rodrigo Paz of the Christian Democratic Party (PDC) and former president Jorge Quiroga of Libre. Paz won with 55.0% of the vote, marking the first time in Bolivian history that the presidency changed hands through a runoff election and ending two decades of MAS dominance. Meanwhile, MAS retained only two seats in the Chamber of Deputies while losing all seats in the Senate.

== Background ==
The election was held amid a schism within the ruling Movimiento al Socialismo (MAS) between incumbent president Luis Arce and former president Evo Morales. The former allies fell out after Arce's election in 2020, when Morales—returning from exile following the political unrest triggered by his contested reelection bid—sought to regain control of the party. Public dissatisfaction with the Arce government was further spurred by shortages of essential goods like gasoline, diesel, food, and medicine in late 2024 and early 2025.

Morales announced his intention to run as the candidate of the Front for Victory (FPV), despite a ban from the Plurinational Constitutional Tribunal on his running for president again. The government subsequently deregistered the FPV, citing its failure to meet the mandatory 3% threshold in the previous election. In reaction to being barred from the race, Morales called for a boycott of the vote. From a rural compound guarded by supporters, he promised to mobilize his supporters and "give battle on the streets" if a right-wing candidate won. Right-wing figures like Jorge Quiroga vowed to arrest Morales if they won, leading rural coca unions such as the Six Federations to pledge a guerrilla war in his defense.

On 14 May 2025, President Arce announced he would not seek a second term. The MAS nominated government minister Eduardo Del Castillo in his place. Two days later, on 16 May, demonstrators attempting to register Morales as a candidate clashed with police in La Paz.

Meanwhile, right-leaning parties formed a Unity Bloc to oppose the MAS; its candidates included Samuel Doria Medina and Jorge Quiroga. Several candidates, including Quiroga and Chi Hyun Chung, registered their campaigns using minor party labels, such as the Revolutionary Left Front (FRI) and the Revolutionary Nationalist Movement (MNR), despite the historical ideological differences between these parties and the candidates.

== Electoral system ==
Approximately 7.9 million people were eligible to vote in the 2025 election.

The President is elected through a modified two-round system. A candidate wins outright in the first round by receiving either more than 50% of the vote, or at least 40% of the vote and a lead of 10 percentage points over the nearest rival. If neither condition is met, a run-off is held between the top two candidates.

The 130 members of the Chamber of Deputies are elected through a mixed-member proportional representation (MMP) system with two votes:

- 63 deputies are elected by first-past-the-post in single-member districts.
- 60 deputies are elected by party-list proportional representation from closed lists on a departmental basis, using a 3% electoral threshold. These list seats are allocated to parties proportionally based on the presidential vote, subtracting the seats they won in single-member districts to ensure overall proportionality.
- 7 deputies are reserved for indigenous representatives and elected by usos y costumbres (customary law). A voter may only vote in one type of constituency (coexistence).
- Electoral rules mandate gender parity: party lists must alternate between men and women. For single-member districts, a male candidate must have a female alternate, and vice versa, ensuring that women hold at least 50% of these seats.

The 36 members of the Chamber of Senators—four from each of the nine departments—are elected from closed party lists using the D'Hondt method. Senate seats are also awarded based on the presidential vote.

This election uses a form of the double simultaneous vote, meaning a single vote is used to elect the President (first round), Deputies, and Senators simultaneously. Consequently, voters cannot split their ticket between the executive and legislative branches, though they can vote for a different party in the single-member deputy district elections.

Voting is compulsory for all citizens over 18. Voters receive a card as proof of participation, which is required to withdraw one's salary from a bank for three months following the election. This compulsory voting is linked to a relatively high rate of invalid ballots, a factor often reflected in poll percentages for "would not vote."

== Candidates ==
Candidacy	Parties and alliances		Experience	Vice Presidential candidate
Andrónico Rodríguez (age 37)	AP	List: Third System Movement (MTS); Socialist Revolutionary Party (PSR); Autonomist Movement for Work and Stability (MATE)	President of the Chamber of Senators (2020–2025); Senator for Cochabamba (2020–2025)	Mariana Prado
Pavel Aracena (age 56)	LYP-ADN	List: Nationalist Democratic Action (ADN); We Are All Pando (PST); Autonomous Nationalities for the Change and Revolutionary Empowerment (NACER)	Engineer	Victor Hugo Núñez del Prado
Manfred Reyes Villa (age 71)	APB Súmate	List: Autonomy for Bolivia – Súmate (APB Súmate)	Mayor of Cochabamba (1994–2000, 2021–present); Prefect of Cochabamba (2006–2008); Presidential candidate in 2002 and 2009	Juan Carlos Medrano
Jorge "Tuto" Quiroga (age 66)	Libre	List: Revolutionary Left Front (FRI); Social Democratic Movement (Demócratas)	62nd President of Bolivia (2001–2002); 36th Vice President of Bolivia (1997–2001); Minister of Finance (1992); Presidential candidate in 2005 and 2014	Juan Pablo Velasco
Jhonny Fernández (age 62)	FP	List: Solidarity Civic Unity (UCS); Popular Original Movement (MOP)	Mayor of Santa Cruz de la Sierra (1995–2002, 2021–present); Presidential candidate in 2002	Rosa Huanca
Eduardo Del Castillo (age 37)	MAS-IPSP	List: Movement for Socialism – Political Instrument for the Sovereignty of the Peoples (MAS-IPSP)	Minister of Government (2020–2025)	Milan Berna
Samuel Doria Medina (age 67)	Unidad	List: National Unity Front (UN); We Believe (Creemos)	Minister of Planning and Coordination (1991–1993); Presidential candidate in 2005, 2009 and 2014	José Luis Lupo
Rodrigo Paz (age 59)	PDC	List: First The People (PG); MIR; New Ideas With Liberty (NUIL); Direct Democracy (DD); Christian Democratic Party (PDC)	Senator for Tarija (2020–2025); Mayor of Tarija (2015–2020); Deputy for Tarija (2002–2009)	Edmand Lara

=== Withdrew ===
Candidacy	Parties and alliances		Experience	Vice Presidential candidate	Withdrawal date
Fidel Tapia	NGP	List: New Patriotic Generation (NGP)	None	Edgar Uriona Veizaga	26 June 2025
Eva Copa (age 39)	MORENA	List: National Renewal Movement (MORENA)	Mayor of El Alto (2021–present); President of the Chamber of Senators (2019–2020); Senator for La Paz (2015–2020)	Jorge Richter	28 July 2025

=== Disqualified candidates ===
The following notable individuals were the subject of speculation or declared their intention to run but were declared ineligible by the Plurinational Constitutional Tribunal (TCP) or were otherwise unable to register as candidates.

- Evo Morales (EVO Pueblo) – 65th President of Bolivia (2006–2019).
- Chi Hyun Chung (AMAR) – Physician and presidential candidate in the 2019 Bolivian general election.
- Jaime Dunn (NGP) – Financial adviser.
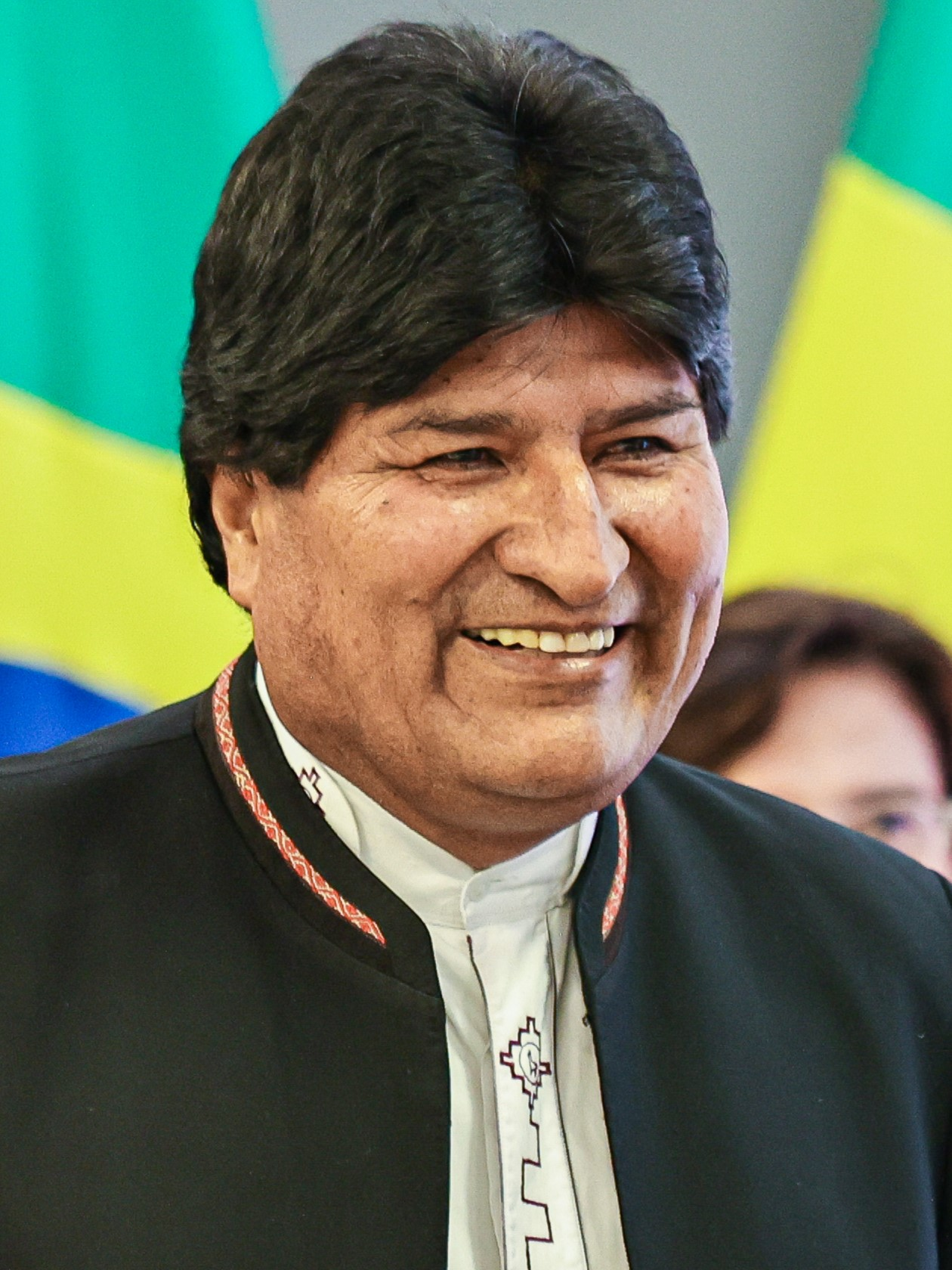
65th President of Bolivia Evo Morales

=== Declined to run ===
The following notable individuals were the subject of speculation about a potential candidacy but publicly declined to run:

- Luis Arce (MAS-IPSP) – Former president of Bolivia (2020–2025). Initially considered a candidate, he later announced he would not seek re-election.
- Carlos Mesa (CC) – Former president of Bolivia (2003–2005).
- Luis Fernando Camacho (Creemos) – Governor of Santa Cruz (2021–present). Was in prison during the election.
- Eduardo Rodríguez Veltzé (Independent) – Former president of Bolivia (2005–2006).
- Rubén Costas (MDS) – Former governor of the department of Santa Cruz (2015–2021).
- Branko Marinković (ADN) – Former minister of economy and public finance (2020).
- Amparo Ballivián – Former minister of housing.
- Vicente Cuéllar (Cambio25) – Rector of the Gabriel René Moreno Autonomous University.
- Jaime Soliz (PDC) – Former prosecutor of the department of Santa Cruz (2005–2010).
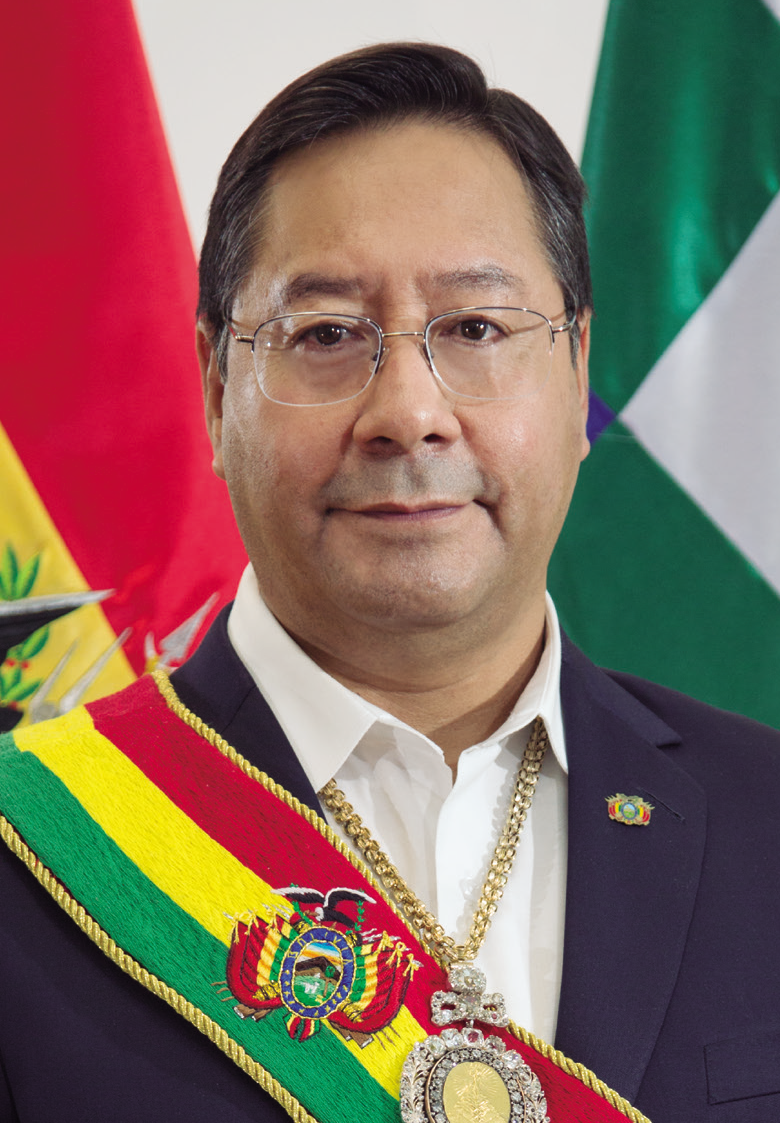
Former President of Bolivia Luis Arce

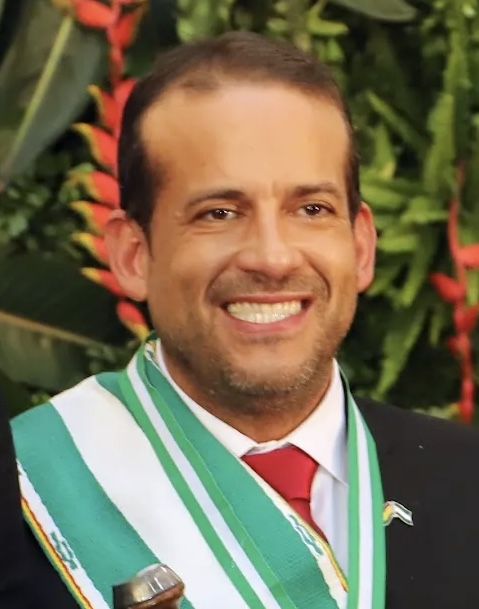
Former governor of Santa Cruz Luis Fernando Camacho

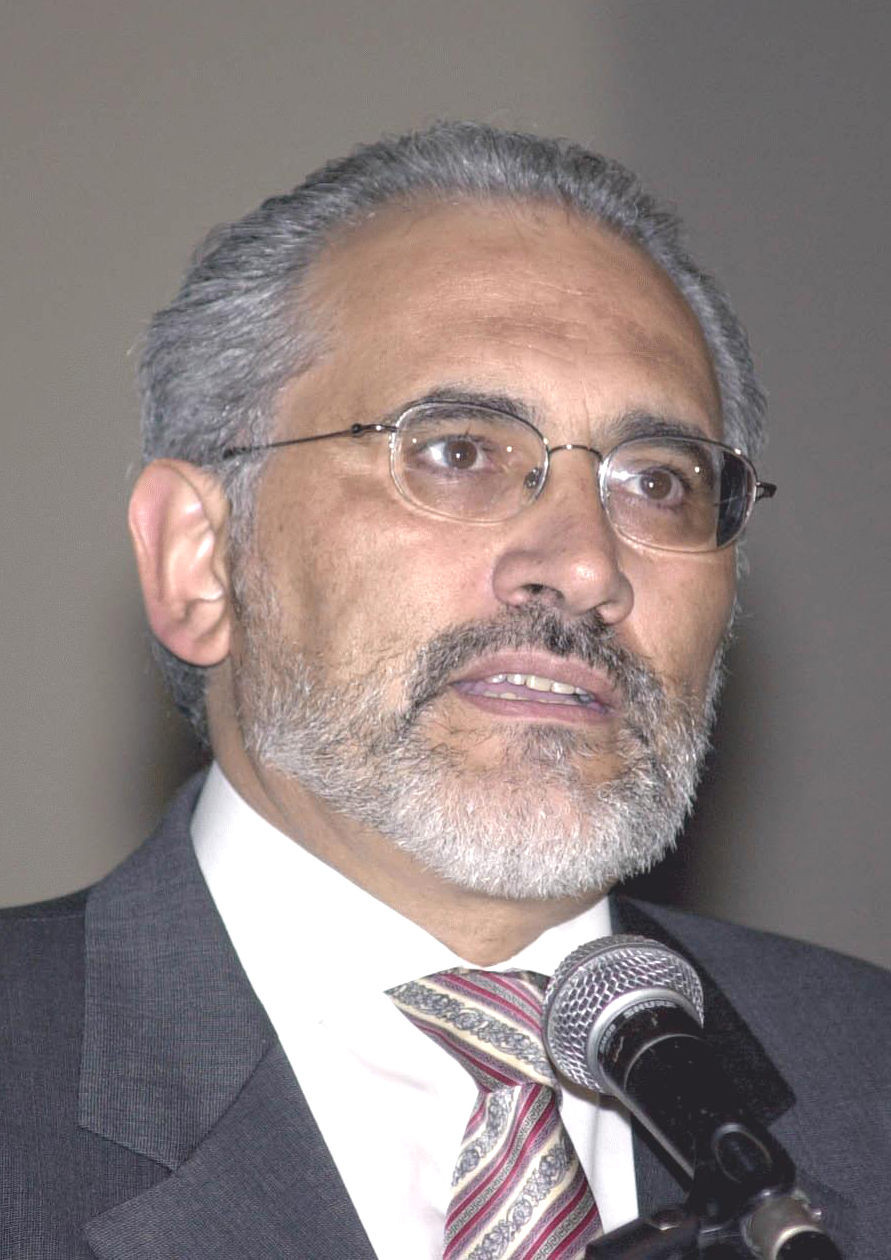
Former president of Bolivia Carlos Mesa

== Campaign ==
The campaign was marked by the first televised debate in 20 years, following a ban imposed during Evo Morales's presidency. The debates featured sharp exchanges, including Samuel Doria Medina's accusations that Eduardo del Castillo had links to drug traffickers and del Castillo's criticism of Doria Medina's past electoral failures. Andrónico Rodríguez and Jorge Quiroga also clashed over alleged involvement in extrajudicial killings.

=== Candidate platforms ===
The right-leaning candidates, Samuel Doria Medina and Jorge "Tuto" Quiroga, presented similar platforms focused on economic liberalization and a foreign policy re-alignment. Both pledged to:

- Arrest former president Evo Morales.
- Restore diplomatic relations with the United States and Israel.
- Cut public spending and eliminate fuel subsidies.
- Partially reverse the nationalizations under Morales and attract foreign investment, particularly for lithium mining.
- Dismantle inefficient state-owned companies.

Doria Medina specifically promised to resolve fuel shortages within his first 100 days, a goal reflected in his campaign slogan, "100 days, dammit!"—a phrase he used after surviving a 2005 plane crash. He also pledged to maintain anti-poverty programs.

Quiroga proposed a more radical economic overhaul, praising Argentine president Javier Milei's libertarian policies. His proposals included:

- Closing the Central Bank of Bolivia, which he accused of being a "credit card" for the Arce administration.
- Establishing a "popular property title" valued at $1,500 for every adult Bolivian to use as loan collateral.
- Seeking a $12 billion bailout from the International Monetary Fund.
- A "liberal ownership revolution" to replace collective Indigenous land titles with individual, inheritable rights.
- Canceling lithium agreements with Russia and China signed under Arce.
- Distancing Bolivia from Iran and withdrawing recognition of Nicolás Maduro as president of Venezuela.

Rodrigo Paz campaigned on a platform of "Capitalism for All", which included:

- A "50–50 economic model" where half of public funds would be managed by regional governments.
- Cutting $1.2 billion in fuel subsidies while retaining assistance for schoolchildren and the elderly.
- Using blockchain for transparency and creating a currency stabilization fund that incorporates cryptocurrency.
- Opposing Doria Medina's proposals for foreign lithium investment and IMF loans.

The MAS candidate, Eduardo del Castillo, campaigned under the slogan "We Are a National Option with Authentic Ideas," while his party colleague Andrónico Rodríguez ran on a platform of "Unity for All" and also supported cutting fuel subsidies.

=== Environmental and post-first round dynamics ===
On environmental policy, both Paz and Quiroga supported using carbon bonds. Quiroga advocated for expanding biofuel production and soy and cattle farming in eastern Bolivia, while Paz pledged to crack down on illegal gold mining and regulate agricultural fires.

After being barred from the election, Evo Morales called the vote illegitimate, labeled Rodríguez a "traitor", and urged his supporters to cast null ballots. He claimed that if null votes exceeded the winning candidate's share - a situation that eventually did not materialize, as both candidates who advanced to the runoff exceeded the null vote share - it would represent a victory for him.

Following the first round, Samuel Doria Medina endorsed Rodrigo Paz for the runoff.

== Opinion polls ==
=== Runoff ===
Polling firm	Fieldwork date	Sample size			Blank vote	Void vote	Undecided
Polling firm	Fieldwork date	Sample size	Quiroga Libre	Paz PDC	Blank vote	Void vote	Undecided
Ipsos CIESMORI/UNITEL	6–9 Oct	2,500	44.9	36.5	3.7	5.6	9.3
Captura Consulting/Red Uno	3–7 Oct	2,560	42.9	38.7	2.6	5.8	10.0
CB Consultora Opinión Pública	1–6 Oct	1,028	44.4	36.2	12.1		7.3
Ipsos CIESMORI/UNITEL	18–21 Sep	2,500	47.0	39.3	3.5	4.7	5.5

=== First round ===
Local regression of polls conducted for the first round

=== After registration of candidacies ===
Polling firm	Fieldwork date	Sample size											Blank vote	Void vote	Undecided
Polling firm	Fieldwork date	Sample size	Medina Unity	Quiroga Libre	Paz PDC	Rodríguez AP	Manfred APB Súmate	Castillo MAS	Fernández FP	Aracena LYP-ADN	Copa MORENA	Tapia NGP	Blank vote	Void vote	Undecided
AtlasIntel	11–13 Aug	1,916	18.0	22.3	7.5	11.4	4.0	8.1	2.6	3.1	–	–	14.6		8.4
Ipsos CIESMORI/UNITEL	2–6 Aug	2,500	21.2	20.0	8.3	5.5	7.7	1.5	2.0	0.5	0.2	–	5.2	14.6	13.3
SPIE/El Deber	31 Jul – 4 Aug	2,500	23.6	24.5	9.1	8.5	8.8	1.8	2.4	0.3	0.2	–	9.9	5.7	5.1
Captura Consulting/Red Uno	27 Jul – 3 Aug	2,500	21.6	20.0	6.4	7.2	9.7	2.0	2.0	0.7	0.4	–	5.0	10.6	14.4
SPIE/El Deber	25–28 Jul	2,500	24.5	22.9	7.6	7.4	7.2	2.1	1.7	0.4	1.0	–	12.1	7.4	5.5
Ipsos CIESMORI/UNITEL	25–27 Jul	2,500	21.5	19.6	4.3	6.1	8.3	2.1	1.8	0.3	0.4	–	8.1	13.6	12.4
SPIE/El Deber	5–10 Jul	2,500	21.8	20.7	4.0	8.3	10.0	1.9	2.5	0.4	1.1	4.8	14.8	4.5	5.3
Ipsos CIESMORI/UNITEL	5–7 Jul	2,500	18.7	18.1	3.2	11.8	8.2	2.3	2.5	0.2	0.6	2.4	8.2	12.5	11.3
Captura Consulting/Red Uno-Cadena A	10–20 Jun	2,500	19.6	16.6	6.4	13.7	8.8	1.4	3.8	–	1.1	0.7	5.0	7.4	15.5
SPIE/El Deber	7–14 Jun	2,500	24.0	22.1	5.6	14.7	9.4	1.7	2.6	0.6	1.4	0.7	9.8	4.5	3.0
Ipsos CIESMORI/UNITEL	22–26 May	2,500	19.1	18.4	4.3	14.2	7.9	2.3	3.7	0.5	1.7	1.0	6.5	10.5	10.0

=== Before registration of candidacies ===
Source	Date	Sample	Link	Morales EVO Pueblo	Quiroga FRI	Manfred APB Súmate	Rodríguez MAS	Medina UN	Chung AMAR	Arce MAS	Choquehuanca MAS	Cuellar Cambio25	Others	Null Blank	Undecided	Lead
15 May 2025				Bolivia's United Nations delegation announces its nomination of David Choquehuanca as UN Secretary-General.												
14 May 2025				Bolivia constitutional court upholds ruling blocking Evo Morales' election eligibility.												
13 May 2025				Luis Arce withdraws his candidacy for re-election.												
Panterra	30 March 2025	5,000		–	15%	11%	25%	16%	13%	–	–	–	–	–	20%	9%
Captura Consulting	27 March 2025	1,500		–	16%	13%	18%	17%	11%	1%	–	–	4%	–	14%	1%
8 March 2025				Vicente Cuellar withdraws his candidacy, endorsing Doria Medina.												
26 February 2025				Luis Arce announces his candidacy pending final decision from MAS.												
20 February 2025				Evo Morales announces his intention to run for president.												
UAGRM	14 February 2025	2,200		14%	8%	15%	10%	10%	14%	2%	–	1%	4%	–	7%	1%
Captura Consulting	23 Jan – 7 Feb	–		8%	19%	13%	–	16%	13%	2%	–	–	9%	–	19%	3%
Bolivia360	5–21 Jan 2025	2,000		–	9%	15%	16%	8%	13%	2%	–	2%	7%	_	8%	1%
Diagnosis	11–12 Jan 2025	1,800		9%	10%	15%	10%	9%	5%	7%	2%	3%	13%	5%	10%	2%
5 January 2025				Manfred Reyes Villa announces his candidacy.												

=== 2021–2024 ===
Date	Polling firm	Morales MAS	Mesa CC	Rodríguez MAS	Galindo Ind.	Manfred Súmate	Arce MAS	Chi Hyun Ind.	Camacho Creemos	Quiroga Libre 21	Copa Ind.	Medina UN	Cuellar Cambio25	Soliz PDC	Claure Ind.	Lara NIL	Paz CC	Choquehuanca MAS	Undecided	Lead
15 November 2024	Consultora Morris	–	1%	25%	–	35%	12%	1%	6%	14%	–	2%	0.8%	–	–	–	0.2%	–	–	10%
2–15 Nov 2024	Panterra	17%	6%	–	–	18%	4%	–	9%	9%	–	13%	–	–	–	–		–	21%	1%
Sep 2024	Diagonsis	10%	8%	10%	–	10%	16%	–	4%	–	–	4%	9%	–	–	–		3%	9%	6%
Jun 2024	Captura Consulting	–	6%	13%	10%	13%	–	6%	10%	4%	–	9%	5%	–	–	3%		–	19%	0
May 2024	Diagnosis	9%	9%	7%		5%	19%	–	3%	–	–	2%	7%	–	–	–	–	–	10%	12%
Apr 2024	Coolosa Comunicaciones	7.73%	7.52%	0.79%	5.80%	11.06%	8.79%	–	1.71%	3.86%	1.25%	5.95%	10.77%	1.29%	–	5.04%	2.82%	–	4.22%	0.83%
16–17 Mar 2024	Diagnosis	12%	10%	7%	–	2%	17%	–	2%	–	–	4%	9%	–	–		–	–	–	5%
15 March 2024	Captura Consulting	–	8%	11%	7%	12%	16%	2%	7%	–	–	9%	3%	–	7%		–	–	18%	4%
Nov 2023	Diagnosis	11%	12%	–	–	3%	21%	–	4%	–	–	5%	9%	–	–		–	–	12%	9%
9–10 Sep 2023	Diagnosis	9%	11%	–	–	4%	18%	–	4%	–	–	6%	9%	–	–		–	–	14%	7%
19–20 Aug 2023	Diagnosis	10%	13%	3%	–	3%	14%	–	2%	–	–	4%	6%	–	–		–	–	18%	1%
Aug 2023	Poder y Placer	11%	10%	–	6%	8%	12%	–	9%	–	2%	9%	3%	–	4%		–	1%	24%	1%
8–9 Jul 2023	Diagnosis	9%	13%	–	–	3%	14%	–	2%	–	–	4%	6%	–	–		–	–	–	1%
22 May-22 Jun 2023	Poder y Placer	12%	13%	–	10%	4%	17%	–	1%	2%	8%	13%	1%	–	3%		1%	2%	–	4%
29 Dec 2022-19 Jan 2023	Poder y Placer	11%	19%	–	2%	9%	21%	–	13%	–	–	19%	–	–	13%		–	–	7%	2%
Jul 2022	Captura Consulting	11%	11%	–	–	–	18%	–	8%	5%	3%	3%	–	–	–		–	–	–	7%
9–19 Apr 2022	Captura Consulting	11%	11%	–	–	10%	17%	–	15%	7%	5%	4%	–	3%	–		–	–	20%	2%
Dec 2021	Captura Consulting	–	13%	–	–	12%	23%	–	15%	3%		–	7%	–	–		–	–	–	8%

== Conduct ==
Voting for the first round took place on 17 August 2025, with polls open from 08:00 to 16:00.

The day was marked by several security incidents. In Chapare Province, former president Evo Morales cast a null ballot while being protected by a human chain of coca growers' union members, who were shielding him from a potential arrest.

In Entre Ríos, Cochabamba, Andrónico Rodríguez was targeted by a mob that threw stones at him as he went to vote, requiring a soldier to escort him. Rodríguez blamed the attack on "a small group of extremists identified as supporters of Morales." An explosive device was later detonated at the same polling station, though it caused no significant damage or injuries.

== Results ==
The first-round results ended two decades of left-wing dominance in Bolivia and produced the country's first-ever presidential runoff, defying pre-election polls. In a surprise outcome, centrist Rodrigo Paz led with 32.06% of the vote, followed by conservative Jorge Quiroga Ramírez with 26.70%, while Samuel Doria Medina (19.69%) was eliminated. True to his pledge to back the leading candidate if defeated, Doria Medina endorsed Paz for the runoff. Altogether, right-leaning candidates obtained more than 68% of the vote.

The ruling Movimiento al Socialismo (MAS) suffered a historic setback. Its nominees, Andrónico Rodríguez (8.51%) and Eduardo del Castillo (3.17%), failed to reach the second round—marking the party's first presidential loss in twenty years. MAS was nearly wiped out in Congress, losing all 21 Senate seats and retaining only two of its 75 in the Chamber of Deputies. The election also saw an unusually high protest vote, with invalid and blank ballots exceeding 20% of the total. Former president Evo Morales, who had urged supporters to cast null votes after his exclusion from the race, hailed the result as a symbolic victory.

The presidential runoff took place on 19 October 2025. Preliminary results released after 21:00 local time showed Rodrigo Paz winning with 54.53% of the vote against Jorge Quiroga's 45.47%. Quiroga conceded several hours later, acknowledging Paz's victory and calling on his supporters and the nation to pursue reconciliation and a peaceful transition of power.

=== President ===
Candidate	Running mate	Party or alliance	First round		Second round	
Candidate	Running mate	Party or alliance	Votes	%	Votes	%
Rodrigo Paz	Edmand Lara	Christian Democratic Party	1,717,432	32.06	3,519,534	54.96
Jorge Quiroga	Juan Pablo Velasco	Libre – Freedom and Democracy	1,430,176	26.70	2,884,661	45.04
Samuel Doria Medina	José Luis Lupo	Unity Bloc	1,054,568	19.69		
Andrónico Rodríguez	Mariana Prado	Popular Alliance	456,002	8.51		
Manfred Reyes Villa	Juan Carlos Medrano	Autonomy for Bolivia – Súmate	361,640	6.75		
Eduardo Del Castillo	Milán Berna	Movimiento al Socialismo	169,887	3.17		
Jhonny Fernández	Rosa Huanca	Force of the People	89,253	1.67		
Pavel Aracena	Víctor Hugo Núñez	Liberty and Progress ADN	77,576	1.45		
Total			5,356,534	100.00	6,404,195	100.00
Valid votes			5,356,534	77.63	6,404,195	94.57
Invalid votes			1,371,049	19.87	317,847	4.69
Blank votes			172,835	2.50	49,769	0.73
Total votes			6,900,418	100.00	6,771,811	100.00
Registered voters/turnout			7,936,515	86.95	7,936,515	85.32
Source: OEP

=== Chamber of Deputies ===
Party or alliance	List (compensatory)			Constituency			Indigenous			Total seats
Party or alliance	Votes	%	Seats	Votes	%	Seats	Votes	%	Seats	Total seats
Christian Democratic Party	1,683,891	32.15	17	1,121,865	25.85	30	5,266	12.59	2	49
Libre – Liberty and Democracy	1,397,226	26.68	17	1,192,394	27.47	20	8,254	19.73	2	39
Unity Bloc	1,039,426	19.85	15	939,038	21.64	11	8,119	19.41	0	26
Popular Alliance	439,388	8.39	5	336,735	7.76	2	6,630	15.85	1	8
Autonomy for Bolivia – Súmate	347,574	6.64	5	373,103	8.60	0	2,344	5.60	0	5
Movimiento al Socialismo	166,917	3.19	1	209,040	4.82	0	6,382	15.26	1	2
Force of the People	86,154	1.65	0	81,586	1.88	0	1,522	3.64	0	0
Liberty and Progress ADN	76,349	1.46	0	86,522	1.99	0	639	1.53	0	0
Indigenous Organisation of Chiquitanía							2,266	5.42	0	0
Yuqui Bia Recuate Indigenous Council							412	0.98	1	1
Total	5,236,925	100.00	60	4,340,283	100.00	63	41,834	100.00	7	130
Valid votes	5,236,925	77.79		4,340,283	65.30		41,834	50.05		
Invalid votes	1,325,596	19.69		1,244,728	18.73		15,876	18.99		
Blank votes	169,327	2.52		1,062,028	15.98		25,878	30.96		
Total votes	6,731,848	100.00		6,647,039	100.00		83,588	100.00		
Registered voters/turnout	7,567,207	88.96		7,567,207	87.84		94,871	88.11		
Source: OEP, OEP

=== Chamber of Senators ===
Party or alliance	Votes	%	Seats
Christian Democratic Party	1,683,891	32.15	16
Libre – Liberty and Democracy	1,397,226	26.68	12
Unity Bloc	1,039,426	19.85	7
Popular Alliance	439,388	8.39	0
Autonomy for Bolivia – Súmate	347,574	6.64	1
Movimiento al Socialismo	166,917	3.19	0
Force of the People	86,154	1.65	0
Liberty and Progress ADN	76,349	1.46	0
Total	5,236,925	100.00	36
Valid votes	5,236,925	77.79	
Invalid votes	1,325,596	19.69	
Blank votes	169,327	2.52	
Total votes	6,731,848	100.00	
Registered voters/turnout	7,567,207	88.96	
Source: OEP, OEP

== Reactions ==
- Argentina: President Javier Milei congratulated both Rodrigo Paz and the Bolivian people on his election victory, and stating that Bolivia "left behind 20 years of the failed model that was socialism of the 21st century".
- Brazil: President Lula da Silva congratulated Rodrigo Paz on his election victory, and talked about preserving relations between Bolivia and Brazil.
- Chile: President Gabriel Boric congratulated Rodrigo Paz on his election victory, reaffirming Chile's "commitment to strengthening cooperation and joint work between brotherly nations for the benefit of our peoples." Boric also praised the Bolivian people for their participation in the runoff between Paz and Quiroga.
- Israel: Foreign minister Gideon Sa'ar congratulated Rodrigo Paz, stating that Bolivia and Israel will "turn a new page and fully renew diplomatic relations between the countries". Relations between the two countries were strained since the start of the Gaza war in 2023.
- Paraguay: President Santiago Peña congratulated Rodrigo Paz on his election win, and emphasized the "brotherly ties" between Bolivia and Paraguay.
- Peru: President José Jeri congratulated Rodrigo Paz, and stated that the relations between the two countries are a "priority".
- United States: Secretary of State Marco Rubio congratulated Rodrigo Paz saying that his victory marks the end of nearly two decades of "government mismanagement and bad governance in Bolivia" and also pledged to work with the incoming Bolivian administration to help them fight against drug cartels and criminal gangs. Shortly before the second round of elections, Rubio said on 15 October 2025 that the two leading candidates (Libre and the PDC), "want better relations with the United States after years of anti-American leadership in Bolivia" and also said that the election would be a "transformative opportunity'.

== See also ==
- 2024 Bolivian coup attempt
