= Creemos =

Bolivian political party

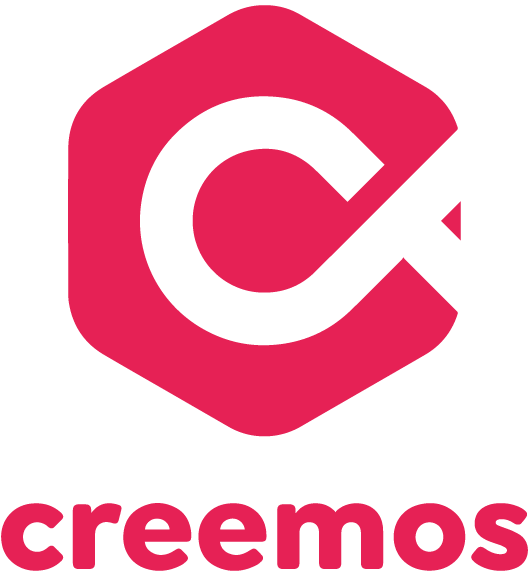
- Leader: Luis Fernando Camacho
- Founded: 23 January 2020 (alliance); 9 December 2020 (party)
- Headquarters: Santa Cruz de la Sierra, Bolivia
- Ideology: Neo-fascism; Regionalism; Conservatism; Conservative liberalism
- Political position: Far-right
- National affiliation: Unity Bloc
- Colors: Rose
- Chamber of Deputies: 7 / 130
- Senate: 2 / 36
- Governorships: 0 / 9
- Mayors: 4 / 337

Website
- creemos.org

Creemos (lit. 'We Believe') is a far-right political party in Bolivia. It was previously an alliance consisting of the Solidarity Civic Unity (UCS) and Christian Democratic Party (PDC), which fielded Luis Fernando Camacho as its candidate for president during the 2020 Bolivian general election where he garnered 14% of the vote.

== Constituent parties ==
As an alliance, Creemos consisted of the following parties:

Party	Ideology
Christian Democratic Party	Anti-communism, conservatism, Christian democracy
Solidarity Civic Unity	Economic liberalism, social conservatism

=== Regional partners ===
Creemos is also allied with several smaller parties that contest regional elections:

Party	English Translation	Department
Seguridad, Orden y Libertad (SOL)	Security Order and Freedom	Santa Cruz
Libertad y Democracia Renovadora (Lider)	Liberty and Renewing Democracy	Chuquisaca
Movimiento de Organización Popular (MOP)	Popular Organization Movement	Potosí

== Electoral results ==
=== Presidential elections ===
Election	Presidential nominee	Votes	%	Votes	%	Result
Election	Presidential nominee	First Round		Second Round		Result
2020	Luis Fernando Camacho	862,184	14.00%			Lost ✗
2025	Samuel Doria Medina (UN)	1,054,568	19.69%			Lost ✗

=== Chamber of Deputies and Senate elections ===
Election	Party leader	Votes	%	Chamber seats	+/-	Position	Senate seats	+/-	Position	Status
2020	Luis Fernando Camacho	862,184	14.00%	16 / 130	New	▲3rd	4 / 36	New	▲3rd	Opposition
2025	Luis Fernando Camacho	1,039,426	19.85%	26 / 130	▲10	3rd	7 / 36	▲3	3rd	Government
