= Libre (Bolivia) =

Liberty and Republic Libertad y República
- Abbreviation: Libre
- Leader: Jorge Quiroga
- Founded: 17 December 2024
- Legalized: 17 April 2025
- Ideology: Conservative liberalism Neoliberalism
- Political position: Right-wing
- Colors: Red; Blue
- Slogan: #EsConTuto
- Senate: 12 / 36
- Deputies: 39 / 130

Website
- www.libre.com.bo

Liberty and Republic (Spanish: Libertad y República, Libre; English: Free), is a right-wing political party in Bolivia. It is led by former president Jorge Quiroga.

Libre was formed in December 2024 to contest the 2025 general election. After failing to run within the Bloc of Unity, it was registered as a coalition between the Revolutionary Left Front (FRI) and the Social Democratic Movement (MSD) under the name Liberty and Democracy. In November 2025, Libre was registered as a full-fledged party.

== History ==
=== Background ===
On 8 January 2020, Jorge Quiroga, President of Bolivia from 2001 to 2002, announced his candidacy for the 2020 general election. In order to run, he formed an alliance with the Revolutionary Nationalist Movement and the Movement for Sovereignty, named Libre 21 – Liberty and Democracy. The alliance nominated Quiroga for president and Tomasa Yarhui for vicepresident. With most of the opinion polls giving Libre 21 a vote share around 1% and 3%, the alliance dropped out from the race on 11 October. The move, aimed at preventing Luis Arce from winning in the first round, failed as Arce won more than 50% of the vote on election day.

=== 2025 general election ===
Ahead of the 2025 general election, Quiroga announced his intention of mounting a presidential candidacy and suggested the Revolutionary Left Front (FRI) as the political vehicle to register his candidacy. On 18 December 2024, former president Carlos Mesa, announced the formation of the Unity Bloc, which would be conformed by former minister Samuel Doria Medina, former governor of Santa Cruz Luis Fernando Camacho and Quiroga himself.

As most of the precandidates withdrew from the race in the successive months, the remaining candidates, Doria Medina and Quiroga, clashed over the method used to determine who would receive the nomination of the block. Eventually, Quiroga opted to split from the block and register Libre as an independent alliance composed of the FRI and the Social Democratic Movement (MSD). The alliance was registered in the Plurinational Electoral Organ on 17 April 2025, becoming the first alliance to do so.

== Composition ==
Party	Leader	Ideology	Political position
Revolutionary Left Front (FRI)	Edgar Guzmán Jáuregui	Populism	Centre-right
Social Democratic Movement (Demócratas)	Ruben Costas Aguilera	Liberal conservatism	Right-wing to far-right

== Election results ==
=== Presidential elections ===
Election	Presidential nominee	Votes	%	Votes	%	Result
Election	Presidential nominee	First round		Second round		Result
2025	Jorge Quiroga	1,430,176	26.70%	2,881,972	45.11%	Lost ✗

=== Chamber of Deputies and Senate elections ===
Election	Party leader	Votes	%	Chamber seats	+/-	Position	Senate seats	+/-	Position	Status
2025	Jorge Quiroga	1,397,226	26.68%	39 / 130	New	▲2nd	12 / 36	New	▲2nd	Opposition
