= APB Súmate =

Autonomy for Bolivia – Súmate Autonomía Para Bolivia – Súmate
- Abbreviation: APB Súmate
- Leader: Manfred Reyes Villa
- President: Henry Paredes
- Founder: Manfred Reyes Villa
- Founded: 9 December 2020 (Súmate group); 13 December 2024 (APB Súmate party)
- Merger of: Autonomy for Bolivia; Súmate
- Preceded by: New Republican Force
- Membership (2025): 110,878
- Ideology: Conservatism; Regionalism
- Political position: Right-wing
- Colours: Purple; Red
- Senate: 1 / 36
- Deputies: 5 / 130
- Andean Parliament: 0 / 5
- Governors: 0 / 9
- Mayors: 6 / 340

The Autonomy for Bolivia – Súmate (Spanish: Autonomía Para Bolivia – Súmate, APB Súmate) is a Bolivian national political party founded on 13 December 2024. Its political leader is Manfred Reyes Villa, currently mayor of the city of Cochabamba and founder of the defunct New Republican Force (from which it also inherited its colors). It was founded as a result of the merger of citizen groups Autonomy for Bolivia and Súmate (lit. 'Join Up'), the latter also led by Reyes Villa.

== History ==
=== Background ===
Manfred Reyes Villa founded his own party, the New Republican Force (NFR), in 1995 after leaving the Nationalist Democratic Action (ADN). In the 1997 Bolivian general election, NFR supported the coalition led by ADN and the Christian Democratic Party (PDC) in a ticket with former Bolivian President and General Hugo Banzer, who won the presidency.

The Plan Progress for Bolivia – National Convergence coalition, which brought together the New Republican Force, the Revolutionary Nationalist Movement, the Plan Progress for Bolivia, and the People's Party, was founded for the 2009 general election, where it lost to Evo Morales of the MAS-IPSP.

=== Súmate group ===
Following the 2019 protests and subsequent political crisis that led to the resignation of Evo Morales as president following allegations of electoral fraud, Manfred Reyes Villa returned to Bolivia to launch his Súmate political campaign for mayor of Cochabamba. He won the mayoral election by a majority of 55.63%.

=== APB Súmate party ===
In August 2024, Reyes Villa hinted at the possibility of creating a political party ahead of the general election the following year. For this purpose, the de jure acronym "Autonomía para Bolivia" (APB) was used, which was part of the Plan Progress for Bolivia – National Convergence coalition in 2009. Following a request to the Plurinational Electoral Organ (TSE), the name was changed to APB Súmate, also using the acronym "National Democratic Republican Force" (FRND).

The announcement also implied that Súmate was going from being a citizens' group to becoming a political party. To achieve this, TSE required the collection of more than 100,000 signatures in support of its transformation into a national political party.

== Election results ==
=== Presidential elections ===
Election	Presidential nominee	Votes	%	Votes	%	Result
Election	Presidential nominee	First round		Second round		Result
2025	Manfred Reyes Villa	361,640	6.75%			Lost ✗

=== Chamber of Deputies and Senate elections ===
Election	Party leader	Votes	%	Chamber seats	+/-	Position	Senate seats	+/-	Position	Status
2025	Manfred Reyes Villa	347,574	6.64%	4 / 130	New	▲5th	1 / 36	New	▲4th	Opposition
