= Jhonny Fernández =

Bolivian politician (born 1964)

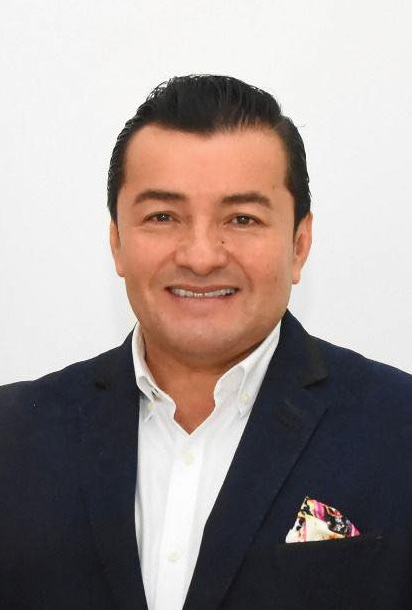
- Fernández in 2022

Mayor of Santa Cruz
- In office 3 May 2021 – 4 May 2026
- Preceded by: Angélica Sosa
- Succeeded by: Mamen Saavedra
- In office 3 December 1995 – 10 January 2002
- Preceded by: Percy Fernández
- Succeeded by: Roberto Fernández Saucedo

Personal details
- Born: 21 March 1964 (age 62)
- Party: Solidarity Civic Unity
- Parent: Max Fernández (father)

Max Jhonny Fernández Saucedo (born 21 March 1964) is a Bolivian politician. He has served as mayor of Santa Cruz since 2021, having previously served from 1995 to 2002. He has served as leader of Solidarity Civic Unity since 1996. He was a candidate for president of Bolivia in the 2025 election, placing 7th with 1.67% of the vote. He was previously a candidate in the 2002 election. From 1995 to 2002, he served as president of the Cervecería Boliviana Nacional. He is the son of Max Fernández.
