= National Renewal Movement (Bolivia) =

National Renewal Movement Movimiento de Renovación Nacional
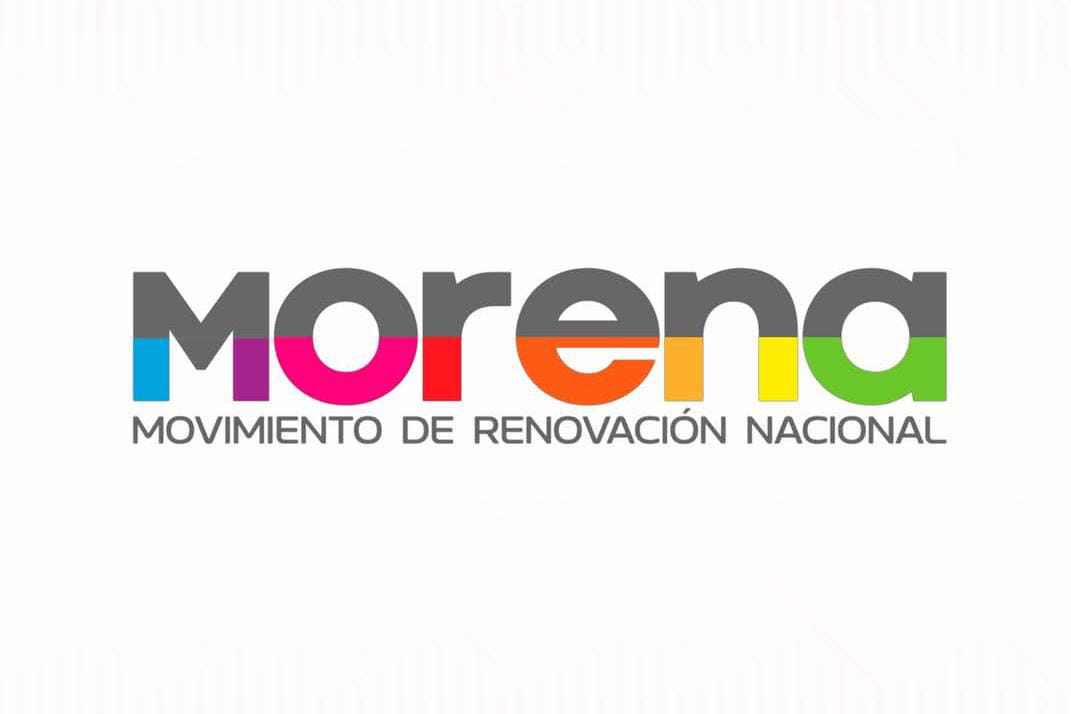
- Leader: Eva Copa
- Founded: January 12, 2025
- Split from: Movimiento al Socialismo
- Ideology: Reformism
- Political position: Center-left
- Senate: 0 / 36
- Deputies: 0 / 130
- Governorships: 1 / 9
- Mayors: 1 / 337

The National Renewal Movement (Spanish: Movimiento de Renovación Nacional), known by its syllabic abbreviation Morena, is a Bolivian political party led by Eva Copa, the mayor of El Alto. Copa had been a member of the ruling Movimiento al Socialismo until 2020, when she left the party to become an independent. She later served as President of the Senate under the government of Jeanine Áñez.

The party also claims governor of Chuquisaca Damián Condori as a member.
