= Manfred Reyes Villa =

Bolivian politician (born 1955)

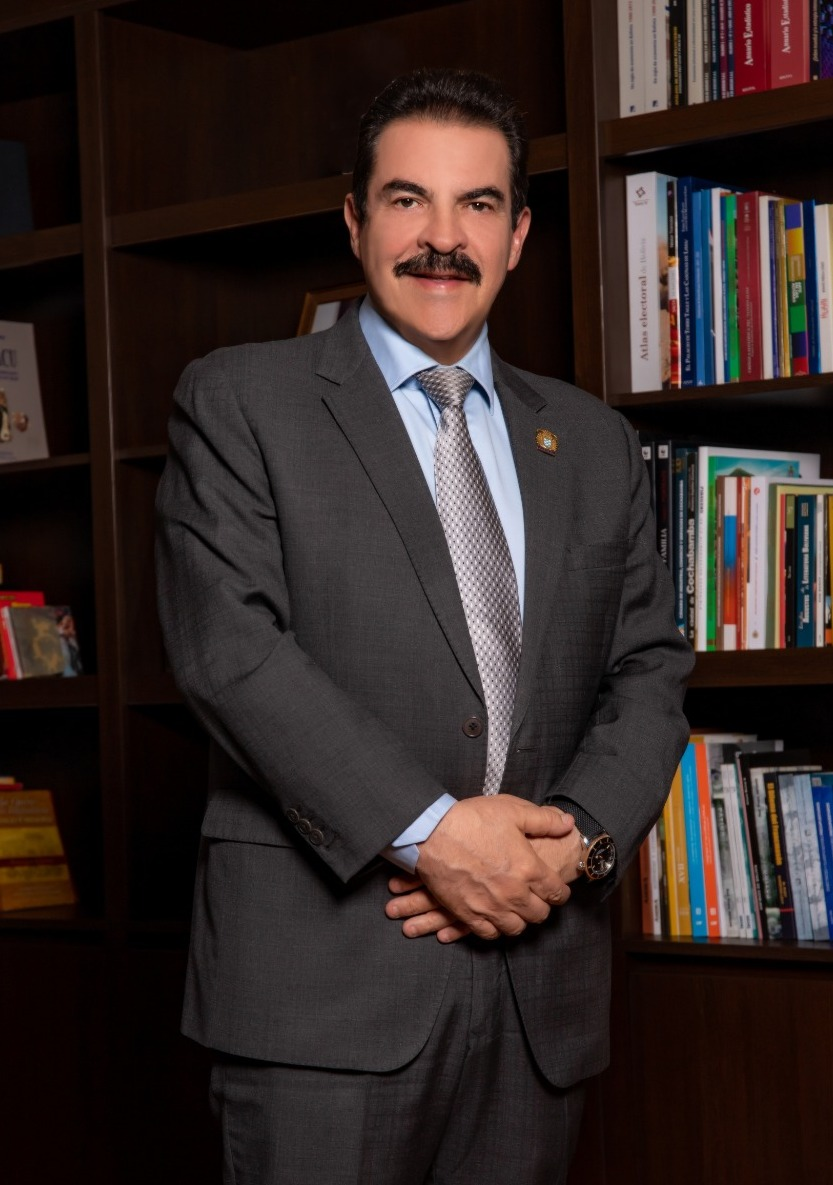
- Reyes Villa in 2023

Mayor of Cochabamba
- Incumbent
- Assumed office 3 May 2021
- Preceded by: Ivan Tellería (interim)
- In office 10 January 1994 – 24 April 2000
- Preceded by: Humberto Coronel Rivas
- Succeeded by: Gonzalo Gabriel; Terceros Rojas (interim)

Prefect of Cochabamba
- In office 23 January 2006 – 10 August 2008
- Preceded by: Walter Céspedes Ramallo
- Succeeded by: Rafael Puente (interim)

Personal details
- Born: Manfred Armando Antonio Reyes Villa Bacigalupi; 19 April 1955 (age 70) La Paz, Bolivia
- Party: APB Súmate (2024–present)
- Other political affiliations: ADN (before 1995); NFR (1995–2009); PPB-CN (2009–2013); Súmate (2021–present)
- Spouse: Patricia Avilés
- Children: 7
- Parents: Armando Reyes Villa; Rosario Bacigalupi
- Education: Military College of the Army
- Website: Campaign website

Military service
- Allegiance: Bolivia
- Branch: Bolivian Army
- Service years: 1977–1986
- Rank: Captain

Manfred Armando Antonio Reyes Villa Bacigalupi (born 19 April 1955) is a Bolivian politician, businessman, and former military officer. He was the mayor of the city of Cochabamba from 1994 to 2000, and became the elected Prefect of the Department of Cochabamba from 2006 until 2008 when he was recalled in that year's no confidence referendum.

== Early life ==
Villa was born on 19 April 1955 in La Paz, Bolivia. Villa is the son of Armando Reyes Villa, who was the Minister of Defense during Luis García Meza's dictatorship. From February to April 1976, he attended courses at the School of the Americas as a cadet in Combat Arms Basic C-2.

Afterwards, he became a military attaché at the Bolivian embassies in Brazil and the United States, and was an aide to Luis García Meza. According to the newspaper Hoy, Villa was involved in the Harrington Street Massacre of 1981, where eight members of the MIR-NM were killed. He retired from the military in 1986 and settled in the United States, where he pursued a career in business administration and became Vice President of the Crawford International Silver Spring in Maryland.

== Political career ==
Villa returned soon after to Bolivia in the early 1990s to join the Nationalist Democratic Action. Eventually, he convinced the party to establish an alliance with the center-left Free Bolivia Movement. In 1992, he assumed the vice-presidency of the Municipal Council of Cochabamba, before being elected mayor of the city the following year.

He was an unsuccessful candidate for president in both 2002 and 2009, being the runner-up in the latter. In 2009, he relocated to the United States, living in Miami for nearly 10 years.

Reyes Villa successfully ran for mayor of Cochabamba once again in the 2021 Bolivian regional elections, winning with 55% of the popular vote.

Political offices
Preceded by Humberto Coronel Rivas	Mayor of Cochabamba; 1994–2000	Succeeded by Gonzalo Gabriel; Terceros Rojas; Interim
Preceded by Walter Céspedes Ramallo	Prefect of Cochabamba; 2006–2008	Succeeded by Rafael Puente; Interim
Preceded by Ivan Tellería; Interim	Mayor of Cochabamba; 2021–present	Incumbent
Party political offices
Preceded by New political party	New Republican Force nominee for President of Bolivia; 2002	Succeeded by Gildo Angulo Cabrera
Preceded by New political alliance	Plan Progress for Bolivia nominee for President of Bolivia; 2009	Succeeded by Alliance dissolved
