= National Unity Front =

Political party in Bolivia

National Unity Front Frente de Unidad Nacional
- Leader: Samuel Doria Medina
- Founded: 12 December 2003; 22 years ago
- Split from: Revolutionary Left Movement
- Membership (2025): 75,765
- Ideology: Social democracy; Social liberalism
- Political position: Centre to centre-right
- National affiliation: Unity Bloc (since 2024)
- International affiliation: Socialist International
- Colors: white, blue, yellow
- Chamber of Deputies: 16 / 130
- Senate: 4 / 36

The National Unity Front (Spanish: Frente de Unidad Nacional) is a political party in Bolivia. It was founded in late 2003 by Samuel Jorge Doria Medina Auza, who had broken with the Revolutionary Left Movement earlier that year. It has 36 members of the Chamber of Deputies in the Plurinational Legislative Assembly. Despite its substantial share of the urban vote, and 16 former mayors, it does not control any city halls or governorships. The party is closely identified with Doria Medina's cement company Sociedad Boliviana de Cemento (Soboce).

In describing itself, National Unity emphasizes pro-development economic policies and support for democratic governance. Its mission statement calls for "a democratic Bolivia with solidarity, in full development, respectful of human rights, conscious of its diversity, and forging its own destiny". In founding the party, cement magnate Doria Medina called for policies to favor "those entrepreneurs who generate employment and are absent from national decisionmaking". The party seeks to position itself as a moderate third force in Bolivian politics. Despite its membership in the generally centre-left Socialist International, the party is usually described as centrist or centre-right in orientation. Its electoral base is the urban middle class.

At the legislative elections in 2005, the party won 7.8% of the popular vote and 8 out of 130 seats in the Chamber of Deputies and one out of 27 seats in the Senate. Its candidate at the presidential elections, Doria Medina, won 7.8% of the popular vote. In the 2009 elections, Medina ran again and won 5.65% of the vote. The party won three seats in the Chamber of Deputies but none in the Senate. As of 2013, Bolivia's Supreme Electoral Tribunal certified a list of 69,844 members, although the party claims to have 120,000 on its rolls.

In the 2010 regional elections, UN formed alliances with Popular Consensus in Cochabamba and Chuquisaca departments (All for Cochabamba (TPC) and We Are All Chuquisaca, respectively), becoming the largest opposition grouping. Running independently, it was the third-largest party in La Paz and Oruro departments. At the municipal level, the party did not win any mayors' races, after gaining control of 16 in 2004. It obtained municipal council representation in La Paz, El Alto, Cochabamba (where candidate Arturo Murillo narrowly failed to win the mayorship but TPC won five of the eleven seats equaling the governing party's share), and Oruro. In El Alto, Soledad Chapetón was narrowly defeated by MAS-IPSP candidate Edgar Patana, while the party won 3 of 11 council seats. As of 2013, Chapetón is the vice president of the party.

In the 2014 general election, the presidential candidate was its party leader Medina, who in this election was the second-most voted with 24.23% and the party won 9 senators and 36 deputies, becoming the main opposition party to Evo Morales' government. In March 2017 National Unity Front was accepted as a member in the Socialist International.

The National Unity Front contested the 2025 Bolivian general election as part of the Unity bloc.

== Election results ==
=== Presidential elections ===
Election	Presidential nominee	Votes	%	Votes	%	Result
Election	Presidential nominee	First round		Second round		Result
2005	Samuel Doria Medina	224,090	7.80%			Lost ✗
2009	Samuel Doria Medina	258,971	5.65%			Lost ✗
2014	Samuel Doria Medina	1,253,288	24.23%			Lost ✗
2019	Supported Carlos Mesa (FRI)	2,240,920	36.51%			Lost ✗
2020	Did not contest					
2025	Samuel Doria Medina	1,054,568	19.69%			Lost ✗

=== Chamber of Deputies and Senate elections ===
Election	Party leader	Votes	%	Chamber seats	+/-	Position	Senate seats	+/-	Position	Status
2005	Samuel Doria Medina	224,090	7.80%	8 / 130	New	▲3rd	1 / 27	New	▲3rd	Opposition
2009	Samuel Doria Medina	255,299	5.72%	3 / 130	▼5	3rd	0 / 36	▼1	3rd	Opposition
2014	Samuel Doria Medina	As part of UD		32 / 130	▲29	▲2nd	9 / 36	▲9	▲2nd	Opposition
2019	Did not contest			0 / 130	▼32	—N/a	0 / 36	▼9	—N/a	Annulled
2020	Did not contest			0 / 130	0	—N/a	0 / 36	0	—N/a	Extra-parliamentary
2025	Samuel Doria Medina	As part of Unity		26 / 130	▲26	▲3rd	7 / 36	▲7	▲3rd	Government
