= Jorge Quiroga =

President of Bolivia from 2001 to 2002

Jorge Quiroga OCA OSP
- Official portrait, 2001

62nd President of Bolivia
- In office 7 August 2001 – 6 August 2002 (Note: Acting: 1 July – 7 August 2001)
- Vice President: Vacant
- Preceded by: Hugo Banzer
- Succeeded by: Gonzalo Sánchez de Lozada

36th Vice President of Bolivia
- In office 6 August 1997 – 7 August 2001
- President: Hugo Banzer
- Preceded by: Víctor Hugo Cárdenas
- Succeeded by: Carlos Mesa
Other offices
International Presidential Delegate
In office 2 December 2019 – 8 January 2020
President	Jeanine Áñez
Minister of Finance
In office 17 March 1992 – 12 November 1992
President	Jaime Paz Zamora
Preceded by	David Blanco Zabala
Succeeded by	Juan Pablo Zegarra

Personal details
- Born: Jorge Fernando Quiroga Ramírez; 5 May 1960 (age 66) Cochabamba, Bolivia
- Party: Libre (since 2025)
- Other political affiliations: Nationalist Democratic Action (1993–2005); Christian Democratic (2014–2016)
- Spouses: Virginia Gillum (m. 1989; div. 2008) Milena Dobronić (m. 2025)
- Relatives: Ana María Quiroga Ramírez (sister)
- Education: Texas A&M University; St. Edward's University (MBA)
- Occupation: Industrial engineer; politician

Jorge Fernando Tuto Quiroga Ramírez (born Jorge Fernando Quiroga Ramírez; 5 May 1960), known mononymously as Tuto, is a Bolivian industrial engineer and politician who served as the 62nd president of Bolivia from 2001 to 2002. He previously served as the 36th vice president of Bolivia under Hugo Banzer from 1997 to 2001.

Born in Cochabamba, Quiroga graduated from Texas A&M University and received an MBA from St. Edward's University. He worked at IBM in the US, and upon his return to Bolivia was vice president of projects and investment at Mercantil Santa Cruz.

Under Jaime Paz Zamora, Quiroga served in the Ministry of Planning as subsecretary of public investment and international cooperation and was minister of finance from March to December 1992. He was campaign manager for Hugo Banzer's 1993 presidential campaign and became deputy leader of Nationalist Democratic Action in 1995. Banzer named Quiroga as his running mate in the 1997 election, which their ticket won. As vice president, Quiroga influenced the administration's economic policy and coca eradication plan. His fraught relationship with Banzer nearly led to a split several times.

In 2001, Banzer resigned due to a terminal cancer diagnosis and Quiroga succeeded to the presidency. He was one of the youngest presidents in Bolivian history. During his short administration, a national census was conducted and Bolivia unsuccessfully tried to negotiate a natural gas sale to the US. Since leaving office in 2002, Quiroga has been a perennial candidate for president in subsequent elections. He was the runner-up in 2005, placed third in 2014, and dropped out of the 2009 and 2020 elections. He ran again in the 2025 election and advanced to the first-ever ballotage in Bolivian history, being defeated by Rodrigo Paz.

== Background and early life ==
Quiroga was born in Cochabamba, Bolivia on 5 May 1960 at 6 am. He graduated from Texas A&M University in 1981 with a degree in industrial engineering, becoming the first head of state from that university. He went on to work for IBM in Austin, Texas while earning a master's degree in business administration from St. Edward's University. He then moved back to Bolivia with his American wife Virginia Gillum. He has 4 children: Vanessa Elena, Cristina Andrea, Adriana Patricia and Jorge Cristian.

Quiroga and Gillum divorced in 2008. On 19 April 2025, he married Milena Dobronić, who is of Croatian origin.

== Vice President of Bolivia (1997–2001) ==
Quiroga was minister of finance in 1992. He was elected as vice president of Bolivia in 1997 running on the Nationalist Democratic Action ticket with former dictator Hugo Banzer. At 37, he was the youngest vice president in Bolivia's history.

== President of Bolivia (2001–2002) ==
He became president when Banzer resigned because of aggravated health problems (he died a year following his resignation). Quiroga assumed office as acting president on 1 July 2001 and was sworn in on 7 August, to complete Banzer's five-year mandate. Quiroga first praised Banzer in his inauguration speech, stating: "With our applause, let's honor the man ... who left deep footprints in our history.", while acknowledging Bolivia's economic situation at the time. He became the first president since 1896 to be inaugurated in Sucre.

Soon after becoming president he told a reporter from the New Yorker "[Bolivia] will be the vital heart of South America," believing that gas exports would lift the economy, that a long-anticipated transcontinental highway connecting Brazil to Chile would be built passing through the Bolivian city of Cochabamba, and that fibre-optic cables would soon be laid. He blamed Bolivia's lack of economic progress on hypocrisy on free trade in the United States and Europe, saying "Bolivia is the most open economy in South America. Meanwhile, American and European farm subsidies, along with tariffs on textiles and agricultural products, make it impossible for Bolivia to sell its exports in the Global North. They tell us to be competitive while tying our arms behind our backs." When asked about the Bolivian Water Wars of 2000, he said, “A lot of things certainly could have been different along the way, from a lot of different actors. The net effect is that we have a city today with no resolution to the water problem. In the end it will be necessary to bring in private investment to develop the water."

== Post-presidency (2002–present) ==
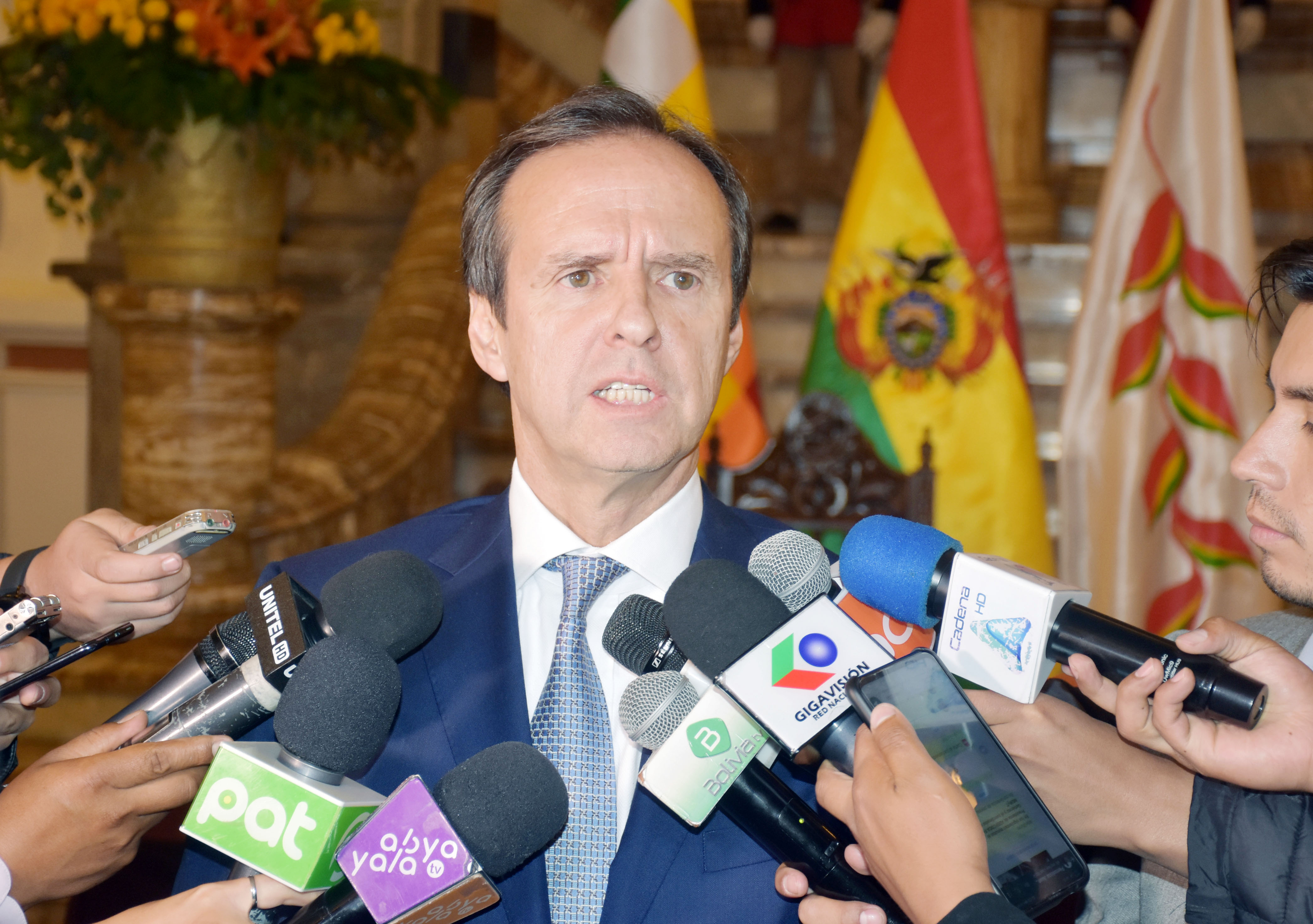
Quiroga in a press conference in late 2019.

Quiroga ran for president in his own right in the 2005 election, as the candidate for a new right-of-center Social Democratic Power (PODEMOS) alliance, which included the bulk of Banzer's former ADN. His main opponent was the leftist Evo Morales of the Movement Toward Socialism. Morales won the election and Quiroga finished a distant second place, receiving 28.6% of the vote.

He has also worked as a consultant for the World Bank and the International Monetary Fund. In 2002, he was honored in a tribute exhibit at his alma mater, Texas A&M University. He is, as of November 2016, active in the private sector and many international organizations, among them: as vice-president of Club de Madrid with almost 100 former heads of state and government; on the board of Results for Development-R4D in Washington D.C.; as a member of the Inter-American Dialogue and the International Advisory Council of the China Economic Club; and in different capacities on the Global Adaptation Institute, the Foro Iberoamericano and many others. He has presided FUNDEMOS since 2002, a Bolivian public policy foundation. His areas of expertise are: management of international aid and cooperation for developing countries; macroeconomic policy; constitutional, legal and institutional reforms; private and official external debt restructuring and relief; programs to reduce drug trafficking and cocaine production; and broadly in South American public policy, trade, economics, finance and banking, integration, politics and development issues.

In 2010 he was charged with libel and slander. He accused the management of the public banking group Banco Unión S.A. of corruption, money laundering, and mismanagement. In the first instance, he was sentenced to two years and eight months in prison. According to the constitution, this means he can no longer run for public office. However, Quiroga filed an appeal.

He was appointed as vice president of the Club de Madrid in 2011.

On 2 December 2019, the interim government of Jeanine Áñez appointed Quiroga as an international delegate on a special mission to denounce alleged human rights violations by the ousted Morales administration. He held the post for just over a month, before resigning on 8 January 2020 in order to announce his presidential candidacy for the snap elections to be held later that year. Throughout the election cycle, he remained around sixth place reaching between 1 and 2% in opinion polling and never surpassing 7%. On 11 October, one week before the scheduled election, Quiroga announced he was dropping out of the presidential race. He indicated in his withdrawal announcement that he wished to prevent an outright victory of Luis Arce in the first electoral round by consolidating opposition around Carlos Mesa.

He previously served as a senior advisor at New Direction, a think tank affiliated with the European Conservatives and Reformists Party in the European Parliament, until 2023. He supported Javier Milei in the 2023 Argentine general election.

For the 2025 election, he announced his presidential candidacy with Liberty and Democracy (Libre), a coalition formed by the Revolutionary Left Front and the Social Democratic Movement, with Juan Pablo Velasco as his running mate for vice president. After receiving around 26% of the votes in the first round on 17 August 2025, he lost a run-off against Senator Rodrigo Paz on 19 October, winning 45.5% of the vote.

== Electoral history ==
Year	Office	Political party	Electoral alliance	Votes			Result
Year	Office	Political party	Electoral alliance	Total	%	P.	Result
1997	Vice president	Nationalist Democratic Action	ADN−NFR−PDC	484,705	22.26	1st	Won
2005	President	Independent	Social Democratic Power	821,745	28.59	2nd	Lost
2014	President	Christian Democratic Party		467,311	9.04	3rd	Lost
2020	President	Independent	Libre 21	Dropped out			Lost
2025	President	Independent	Libre	1,430,176	26.70	2nd	Runoff
2025	President	Independent	Libre	2,881,972	45.11	2nd	Lost
Source: Plurinational Electoral Organ | Electoral Atlas

== Notes ==
Political offices
Preceded by David Blanco Zabala	Minister of Finance; 1992	Succeeded by Juan Pablo Zegarra
Preceded by Víctor Hugo Cárdenas	Vice President of Bolivia; 1997–2001	Vacant Title next held by Carlos Mesa
Preceded by Hugo Banzer	President of Bolivia; 2001–2002	Succeeded by Gonzalo Sánchez de Lozada
Diplomatic posts
Position established	International Presidential Delegate; 2019–2020	Position dissolved
