= Samuel Doria Medina =

Bolivian businessman and politician (born 1958)

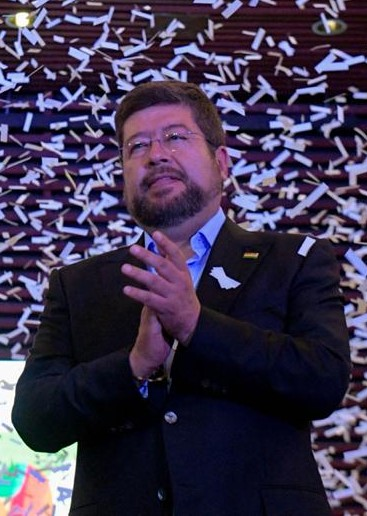
- Doria Medina in 2020

President of the National Unity Front
- In office 12 December 2003 – 15 December 2021
- Preceded by: Party established
- Succeeded by: Elizabeth Reyes

Minister of Planning and Coordination
- In office 9 August 1991 – 6 August 1993
- President: Jaime Paz Zamora
- Preceded by: Luis Enrique García Rodríguez
- Succeeded by: Office abolished

Personal details
- Born: Samuel Jorge Doria Medina Auza; 4 December 1958 (age 67) La Paz, Bolivia
- Party: National Unity Front (2003–present)
- Other political affiliations: Revolutionary Left Movement (1991–2001)
- Spouse: Nidia Monje Postigo
- Children: 3
- Education: London School of Economics
- Website: samuel.bo

Samuel Jorge Doria Medina Auza (born 4 December 1958) is a Bolivian politician and former businessman. From 1987 until 2014, he was the president and main shareholder in SOBOCE, the largest cement manufacturer in Bolivia.

== Early life ==
Samuel Doria Medina was born on 4 December 1958 in La Paz at the Virgen de Copacabana Clinic on 20th Avenue. He graduated high school at the Nuestra Señora de Luján School, a Marist Brothers school, where in 1976 he witnessed the Argentine coup d'etat in Luján. He then studied economics and business administration at Universidad Católica Boliviana, and then earned his master's in economics at Arizona State University in the United States and his PhD in economics with a speciality in public finance from the London School of Economics in the United Kingdom. From a young age he was active in politics, joining the Movement of the Revolutionary Left (MIR).

== Businesses ==
Apart from cement, Doria Medina operates hotel chains and holds the Bolivian franchise for Burger King.

== Politics ==
In the 1990s, Doria Medina served as minister of planning during the presidency of Jaime Paz Zamora.

He is the leader of the National Unity Front and represented the party alongside Carlos Fernando Dabdoub Arrien in the December 2005 presidential election. In that election, Doria Medina finished 3rd with 7.8% of the national vote. He ran again in the 2009 elections and won 5.65% of the vote. Doria Medina ran once again in the 2014 elections; coming out second with 25.1% of the vote. He ran again for president in the 2025 elections but placed third in the first round and failed to advance to the runoff.

He has sought to position himself and his party as a moderate third force in Bolivian politics.

== Personal life ==
Doria Medina married Nidia Monje Postigo in 1983 and has six children.

On 21 January 2005, Medina was travelling aboard a Cessna 208 Caravan, operated by Línea Aérea Amaszonas, that crashed into the Huaricollo Mountain Range, near the Colquiri mine. All eleven occupants on board the aircraft survived the accident, though many were injured.

Political offices
Preceded by Luis Enrique García Rodríguez	Minister of Planning and Coordination; 1991–1993	Succeeded by Office abolished
Party political offices
Preceded by Óscar Zamora Medinaceli; Alliance	Revolutionary Left Movement nominee for Vice President of Bolivia; 1997	Succeeded by Carlos Saavedra
Preceded by Political party established	National Unity Front nominee for President of Bolivia; 2005, 2009, 2014	Succeeded by Most recent
Preceded by Political alliance established	Juntos nominee for Vice President of Bolivia; Withdrew; 2020	Succeeded by Alliance dissolved
