= Governor of Santa Cruz Department =

Chief executive of the Department of Santa Cruz

Governor of Santa Cruz
- Departmental coat of arms

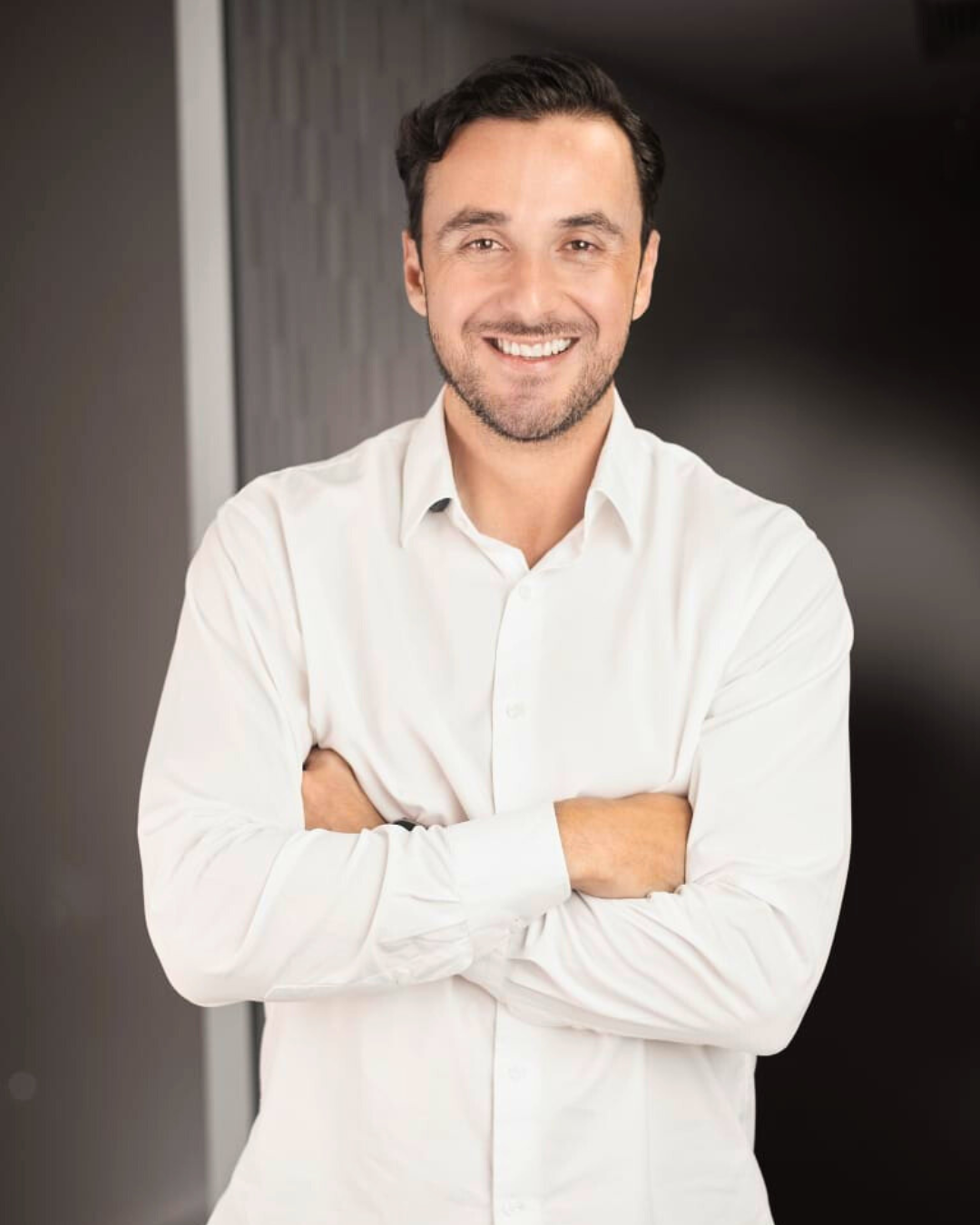
- Incumbent; Juan Pablo Velasco since 3 May 2026
- Executive branch of Santa Cruz Department
- Status: Head of state; Head of government
- Seat: Santa Cruz de la Sierra, Bolivia
- Appointer: Popular vote (two rounds if necessary)
- Term length: Five years, renewable once
- Constituting instrument: Constitution of Bolivia
- Precursor: Prefect of Santa Cruz
- Inaugural holder: Rubén Costas
- Formation: 30 May 2010; 16 years ago
- Deputy: Lieutenant Governor of Santa Cruz
- Website: www.santacruz.gob.bo

The governor of Santa Cruz is the head of government of the Bolivian department of Santa Cruz. Established by the 2009 Constitution of Bolivia, the office of governor superseded the office of prefect, which was historically appointed by the president of Bolivia but in 2005 was made subject to popular will by election. The governor is eligible to be elected to two five-year terms, but must resign from office six months in advance of an election if they wish to be consecutively reelected.

Three individuals have held the office of governor of Santa Cruz since its creation in 2010. Rubén Costas, the first popularly elected prefect but last to serve in that role, took office as the first governor on 30 May 2010. Costas was the longest-serving governor, serving a cumulative 10 years and 5 months between his two terms. Ruth Lozada was the first woman to hold the governorship, serving as acting governor while Costas sought reelection. The current governor is Luis Fernando Camacho, who took office on 3 May 2021. He was suspended January 26, 2024 – August 29, 2025.

== List of governors ==
N°.	Governor	Term	Party	Designation	Lieutenant
1	Rubén Costas (b. 1955)	30 May 2010 – 11 December 2014; Resigned	Verdes	2010 gubernatorial election	Non-existent; 30 May 2010 – 3 May 2021
Office vacant 11–22 December 2014.					Non-existent; 30 May 2010 – 3 May 2021
–	Ruth Lozada (b. 1959)	22 December 2014 – 30 May 2015; End of mandate	Verdes	Elected by the Departmental; Legislative Assembly (President of the Legislative Assembly)	Non-existent; 30 May 2010 – 3 May 2021
1	Rubén Costas (b. 1955)	30 May 2015 – 3 May 2021; End of term	Social; Democratic	2015 gubernatorial election	Non-existent; 30 May 2010 – 3 May 2021
2	Luis Fernando; Camacho (b. 1979)	3 May 2021 – 3 May 2026; Suspended: January 26, 2024 – August 29, 2025	Creemos	2021 gubernatorial election	Mario Aguilera
3	Juan Pablo Velasco (b. 1987)	3 May 2026 – Incumbent	Libre	2026 gubernatorial election	Paola Aguirre
Term			Party	Designation	Lieutenant
