= 2013 Beni special gubernatorial election =

Beni special election for Governor, 2013
← 2010	January 20, 2013	2015 →
Nominee	Carmelo Lens	Jessica Jordan	Pedro Nuni
Party	Beni First	MAS-IPSP	Front for Victory
Popular vote	71,161	60,382	3,606
Percentage	52.27	44.35	2.65
Nominee	Ademirzon Algarañaz
Party	NACER
Popular vote	986
Percentage	0.72
Governor before election
Haysen Ribera Leigue (interim)
MNR
Elected Governor
Carmelo Lens
Beni First

The 2013 Beni special gubernatorial election was held on 20 January 2013. The elections were held to replace the interim governor of Beni Department with an elected executive who will serve until 2015. Numerous observers described the election as an important test of political strength in eastern Bolivia: a MAS victory would signal the retreat of the Media Luna right-wing alliance to Santa Cruz department alone; while a Beni First victory would dash MAS' political ambitions in the department.

Prior to the election, Beni had an interim governor, Haysen Ribera Leigue, who was selected by the Departmental Legislative Assembly on 16 December 2011. Governor Ernesto Suárez Sattori, who was elected on 4 April 2010, was suspended following his indictment for irregular expenditures related to a power plant in San Borja, Beni, in compliance with a Bolivian legal mandate that indicted officials may not continue to serve.

Early unofficial results, tabulated by the exit poll firm IPSOS, gave Carmelo Lens of Beni First a first-round victory with 52.6%, ahead of Jessica Jordan (44.1%), Pedro Nuni (2.4%) and Ademirzon Algarañaz (0.9%). While Lens and his supporters celebrated victory, Jordan pledged to await official results. On January 22, Evo Morales and the national leadership of the MAS–IPSP conceded defeat. Since Lens won more that a 50% majority, there will not be a two-candidate runoff on March 21. Lens was scheduled to be sworn in on March 1.

Final results were released on February 3, 2013 by the Plurinational Electoral Organ (nearly complete results with 997 of the 1000 electoral tables reporting had been released earlier). They showed that Carmelo Lens won 71,161 votes, a 52.27% majority and well ahead of Jessica Jordan's 60,382 votes (44,35%).

== Political parties and candidates ==
Four political parties chose nominees by the deadline. They are as follows:

- Front for Victory (Frente Para la Victoria; FPV): Pedro Nuni, indigenous deputy in the Plurinational Legislative Assembly
- Movement towards Socialism (Movimiento Al Socialismo, MAS-IPSP): Jessica Jordan, representative of the Agency for the Development of Macroregions and Border Zones in Beni, former Miss Bolivia (Agencia de las Macrorregiones y Zonas Fronterizas; Ademaf)
- Autonomous Nationalities for Change and Empowerment (Nacionalidades Autónomas por el Cambio y Empoderamiento; NACER): Ademirzon Algarañaz
- Beni First (Primero El Beni): Carmelo Lens, a lawyer and subgovernor of Vaca Diez province. He previously served as a judged and a university docent.
