= Governor of Santa Cruz =

Governor of Santa Cruz may refer to:

- Governor of Santa Cruz Department, Bolivia.
- Governor of Santa Cruz Province, Argentina.
