= Miguel Ángel Feeney =

Bolivian politician (born 1961)

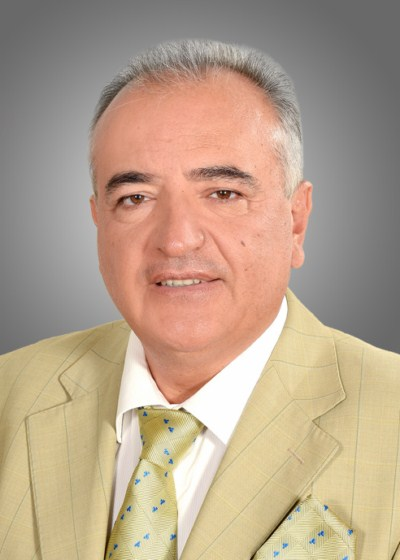
- Official portrait, 2017

Member of the Chamber of Deputies from Santa Cruz
- In office 18 January 2015 – 3 November 2020
- Substitute: Ivonne Aireyu
- Preceded by: Edgar Fernández
- Succeeded by: Anyelo Céspedes
- Constituency: Party list

Personal details
- Born: Miguel Ángel Feeney Parada; 31 May 1961 (age 65) Santa Cruz de la Sierra, Bolivia
- Party: National Unity Front
- Other political affiliations: Nationalist Democratic Action
- Education: Gabriel René Moreno University
- Occupation: Businessman; lawyer; politician

Miguel Ángel Feeney Parada (born 31 May 1961) is a Bolivian businessman, lawyer, and politician who served as a party-list member of the Chamber of Deputies from Santa Cruz from 2015 to 2020. As with many members of Santa Cruz's upper-class economic elite, Feeney's career began in the department's agribusiness sector before moving on to public service. Originally a partisan of Nationalist Democratic Action, Feeney switched allegiances to the National Unity Front in the mid-2000s, serving as the party's departmental leader for Santa Cruz. In 2006 and 2009, respectively, he unsuccessfully sought to be elected to the Constituent Assembly and the Chamber of Deputies before finally attaining the post of deputy in the 2014 election.

== Early life and career ==
Miguel Ángel Feeney was born on 31 May 1961 in Santa Cruz de la Sierra. He attended the city's Marist School, later studying at Gabriel René Moreno University, where he graduated as a lawyer. Feeney followed a career path typical of Santa Cruz's upper-class agro-industrial economic elite, typified by an early presence through leadership positions in the department's most relevant agribusiness associations, followed by a shift to public service and government administration. On the business end, Feeney held the post of general manager of the Bolivian-Brazilian Chamber of Commerce and was a board member of the Federation of Private Entrepreneurs of Santa Cruz.

== Political career ==
Feeney's entry into public administration was facilitated through Nationalist Democratic Action (ADN), a conservative party closely linked to Santa Cruz's agribusiness elites. Feeney entered, first, as the administrative and legal director of the Santa Cruz Mayor's Office before then being promoted to the prefecture, where he also headed the administration's legal department. Later, he was appointed to serve as departmental counselor for the Ibáñez Province, representing one of the area's municipalities in the prefecture.

The early 2000s saw a steep decline in public support for ADN as a political force, brought about by the controversial presidency of Hugo Banzer and exacerbated by the collapse of the traditional party system in 2003, which affected all the neoliberal parties in power to that point. By 2004, many of ADN's leading cadres had opted to "abandon ship", joining new fronts or forming their own ones. Feeney was among those who stayed on longer than most, though even he eventually broke off shortly after ADN's ninth-place showing in the 2004 municipal elections. He switched allegiances to the National Unity Front (UN), a fairly young party led by businessman Samuel Doria Medina.

Together with UN, Feeney faced his first electoral contest in 2006 when he sought to represent Santa Cruz's circumscription 52 in the Constituent Assembly. His campaign failed to gain significant traction, and he was left sidelined at just three percent of the popular vote, reflecting the difficulties UN faced in forming a strong partisan base in the eastern departments. Undeterred, Feeney continued to operate within the party, serving as its departmental leader for Santa Cruz.

== Chamber of Deputies ==
=== Election ===
In 2009, Feeney returned to the electoral arena, this time seeking a seat in the Chamber of Deputies on UN's electoral list. However, due to the party's pact with Popular Consensus (CP), two of the latter's partisans were granted preferential positions, pushing Feeney down to the third slot on the alliance's parliamentary list. UN-CP's poor performance in Santa Cruz—attaining just four percent of the vote—garnered it only one deputy, precluding Feeney from entering the legislature.

Five years later, Feeney once again contested a seat in the Chamber of Deputies, this time as part of the Democratic Unity (UD) alliance, formed between UN and the Social Democratic Movement (MDS). Although the latter's larger presence in Santa Cruz gave it greater sway over the alliance's parliamentary list in that department, Feeney managed to be included, garnering him a seat in the lower chamber.

=== Tenure ===
With declared assets amounting to Bs 8,596,000, Feeney entered parliament as the wealthiest member of UD's parliamentary caucus and the second wealthiest in the entire lower chamber. He spent his first year holding a seat on the lower chamber's Democracy Committee before being promoted to the second vice presidency of the Chamber of Deputies' Directorate in 2016. After that, Feeney closed out his final three years holding positions on the Social Policy Commission, spending two years on the Labor Committee and one on the Social Welfare Committee. Upon the conclusion of his term, Feeney was not nominated for reelection, a product of UN's decision not to compete in the 2019 general elections.

=== Commission assignments ===
- Chamber of Deputies Directorate (Second Vice President: 2016–2017)
- Constitution, Legislation, and Electoral System Commission
  - Democracy and Electoral System Committee (2015–2016)
- Social Policy Commission
  - Labor and Employment Law Committee (2017–2019)
  - Social Welfare and Protection Committee (2019–2020)

== Electoral history ==
Electoral history of Miguel Ángel Feeney
Year	Office	Party	Alliance	Votes			Result	Ref.
Year	Office	Party	Alliance	Total	%	P.	Result	Ref.
2006	Constituent	National Unity Front	None	2,857	3.79%	7th	Lost	
2009	Deputy	National Unity Front	Consensus and National Unity	46,451	4.30%	3rd	Lost	(Note: Presented on an electoral list. The data shown represents the share of the vote the entire party/alliance received in that constituency.)
2014	Deputy	National Unity Front	Democratic Unity	506,704	39.82%	2nd	Won	
Source: Plurinational Electoral Organ | Electoral Atlas

Chamber of Deputies of Bolivia
Preceded by Edgar Fernández	Member of the Chamber of Deputies from Santa Cruz; 2015–2020	Succeeded by Anyelo Céspedes
Preceded by Luis Felipe Dorado	Second Vice President of the Chamber of Deputies; 2016–2017	Succeeded by Víctor Gutiérrez
