= Villca =

Villca is a surname, and may refer to:

- Andrés Villca – Bolivian politician
- Lino Villca Delgado – Bolivian politician
- Óscar Soliz Villca – Bolivian professional road cyclist
- Fredy Trocones Villcas – Mayor of Pacobamba District
- Juan Mamani Villca – Mayor of Comanche Municipality
- Doroteo Villca – Bolivian pianist
