= Luis Fernando Camacho =

Bolivian politician (born 1979)

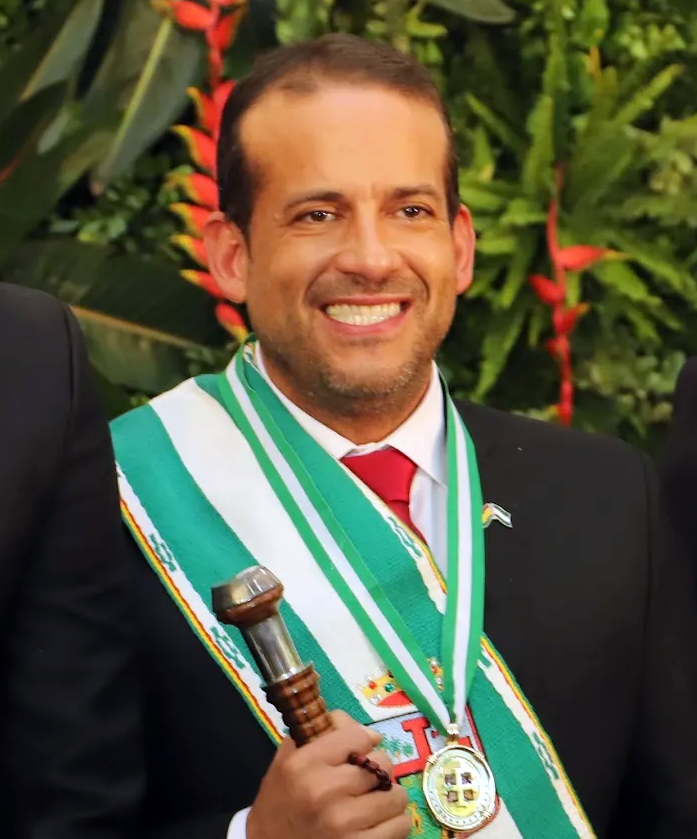
- Camacho in 2021

2nd Governor of Santa Cruz
- In office 3 May 2021 – 3 May 2026; Suspended: 26 January 2024 – 29 August 2025
- Vice Governor: Mario Aguilera Cirbián
- Preceded by: Rubén Costas
- Succeeded by: Juan Pablo Velasco

President of the Pro-Santa Cruz; Civic Committee
- In office 2 February 2019 – 29 November 2019
- Preceded by: Fernando Cuéllar
- Succeeded by: Rómulo Calvo

Personal details
- Born: Luis Fernando Camacho Vaca; 15 February 1979 (age 47) Santa Cruz de la Sierra, Bolivia
- Party: Creemos (since 2020)
- Other political affiliations: Revolutionary Nationalist Movement (2002–2004)
- Relatives: Eliodoro Camacho
- Education: Private University of Santa Cruz; University of Barcelona
- Occupation: Businessman; lawyer; politician

Luis Fernando Camacho Vaca (born 15 February 1979) is a Bolivian activist, businessman, lawyer, and politician who served as the 2nd governor of Santa Cruz from 2021 to 2026. He is the leader of the opposition Creemos and was the chair of the Santa Cruz Civic Committee in 2019. Camacho emerged as a major critic of President Evo Morales and influential public figure during the highly controversial 2019 Bolivian general election, demanding Morales resign on 5 November 2019.

Following Morales' resignation on 10 November 2019 and the scheduling of new elections, Camacho entered Bolivian politics as a presidential candidate for the right-wing party Creemos along with Potosi Civic Committee leader Marco Pumari as his running mate. Camacho would go on to receive 14% of the vote, but losing to Luis Arce or Carlos Mesa in every Bolivian department except his birthplace of Santa Cruz. In the 2021 regional elections, he was elected Governor of Santa Cruz, assuming office on 3 May 2021. Camacho was widely recognized as a major opposition leader in Bolivia during the left-wing rule.

== Early life and education ==
Luis Fernando Camacho was born on 15 February 1979 in Santa Cruz de la Sierra. On his father's side, Camacho is of colla (Paceño) origin and descent. According to Eric Soria—who completed a genealogy of the family in the mid-2010s—Camacho is likely the great-great-grandson of Eliodoro Camacho, a famed veteran of the War of the Pacific who participated actively in Bolivian politics throughout the nineteenth century. (Note: Although the more direct relation is said to be through José Camacho, a sergeant major from La Paz who later settled in Santa Cruz, Soria has posited that he and Eliodoro were one and the same, citing their identical calligraphic style and the former's disappearance from the historical record around the same time the latter gained prominence.) Further down the tree, Camacho's great-grandfather was José Félix Camacho, who served as prefect and senator for Santa Cruz in the early 1900s. The line then continues down through José Camacho Cuéllar before reaching José Luis Camacho Parada, Luis Fernando's father.

Camacho studied law at the Private University of Santa Cruz (UPSA), graduating with a diploma in international commercial contracts and a master's degree in corporate law. He completed a second master's in finance and tax law at the University of Barcelona, Spain. Returning to Bolivia, Camacho worked as a professor at the UPSA, teaching courses on corporate law from 2005 to 2017 and finance and tax law from 2006 to 2015. He also spent shorter yearlong stints as a professor of commercial law from 2006 to 2007 and economic law from 2007 to 2008, also at the UPSA.

== Business career ==
Camacho was legal adviser and shareholder of Bolivian insurance holding Nacional Seguros from 2009 to 2015. Both families of Camacho and fellow businessman and politician Branko Marinkovic have shares in Nacional Seguros holding and its subsidiaries. Camacho also owns Corporación Jurídica, a sole-proprietorship local law firm whose tax address appears in ICIJ's Panama Papers leak lists.

== Political career ==
Camacho served as the vice-president of far-right activism organization Santa Cruz Youth Union from 2002 to 2004. He was inactive between 2004 and 2013, when he became the second vice-president of Provincial Civic Committees of the Cruceñidad, a post he held until 2015. In February 2019, Camacho was elected President of the Civic Committee of Santa Cruz for the 2019-2021 with 234 votes, replacing former president Fernando Cuéllar Núnez.

=== 2019 protests ===
During the November 2019 protests that erupted in Bolivia in response to electoral fraud which was stated by the Organization of American States, Camacho took leadership of principal opposition in the Santa Cruz region to protest against Evo Morales. He called on the security forces to join the opposition. Camacho attempted to present himself as the leader of the anti-governmental opposition, although in reality this opposition included a broad array of social groups expressing grievances with Morales's ruling party and distrust in the electoral process.

After President Evo Morales fled to Cochabamba, Camacho went to the old Government Palace and put down a Bible and a symbolic letter that renounced Morales. Camacho declared: "I don't go with weapons, I go with my faith and my hope; with a Bible in my right hand and his letter of resignation in my left hand." A pastor who was present was recorded saying that "the Bible has re-entered the palace. Pachamama will never return".

=== Añez presidency ===
Following the crisis, Camacho formed the Creemos political alliance and announced his candidacy in the 2020 election with Marco Pumari as his vice-presidential candidate. He gained 14% of the popular vote losing in every department except his home Santa Cruz Department. The latter facilitated his Santa Cruz gubernatorial bid in the 2021 regional elections. With the endorsement of incumbent governor Rubén Costas and in alliance with various opposition groups, Camacho and his running mate Mario Aguilera, officially won the governorship (and deputy governorship respectively) in first round with 860,023 votes (55.64% of the vote).

== Political views ==
In Bolivia, Camacho has a reputation as a conservative Catholic figure, known for his opposition to the far-left Evo Morales presidency. Camacho has widely been placed as right-wing on the political spectrum. Some observers named him the "Bolsonaro of Bolivia".

== Arrest and prosecution ==
=== Apprehension ===
On the afternoon of 28 December 2022, Camacho was apprehended outside his home by Bolivian Police and transferred to the Viru Viru International Airport, to later be taken to La Paz. Recounting the incident to UNITEL, Graciela Ortiz, Camacho's personal assistant, stated that she and the governor had been driving home after a luncheon when their vehicle was intercepted by police vans. Without presenting a warrant, "they threw him to the ground; they yelled at him, another handcuffed him; they picked him up and took him away. I was afraid because we were scared they would kill us," Ortiz stated. Speaking from secondhand, Natalia Ibáñez, Camacho's cousin, added that "they [the police] did not ask him to come out; they broke down [the car] windows [and] subdued two guards." Video of Camacho's arrest distributed by local media outlets corroborated portions of this, showing the governor handcuffed on the side of the road with broken windows in his car.

==== Reactions ====
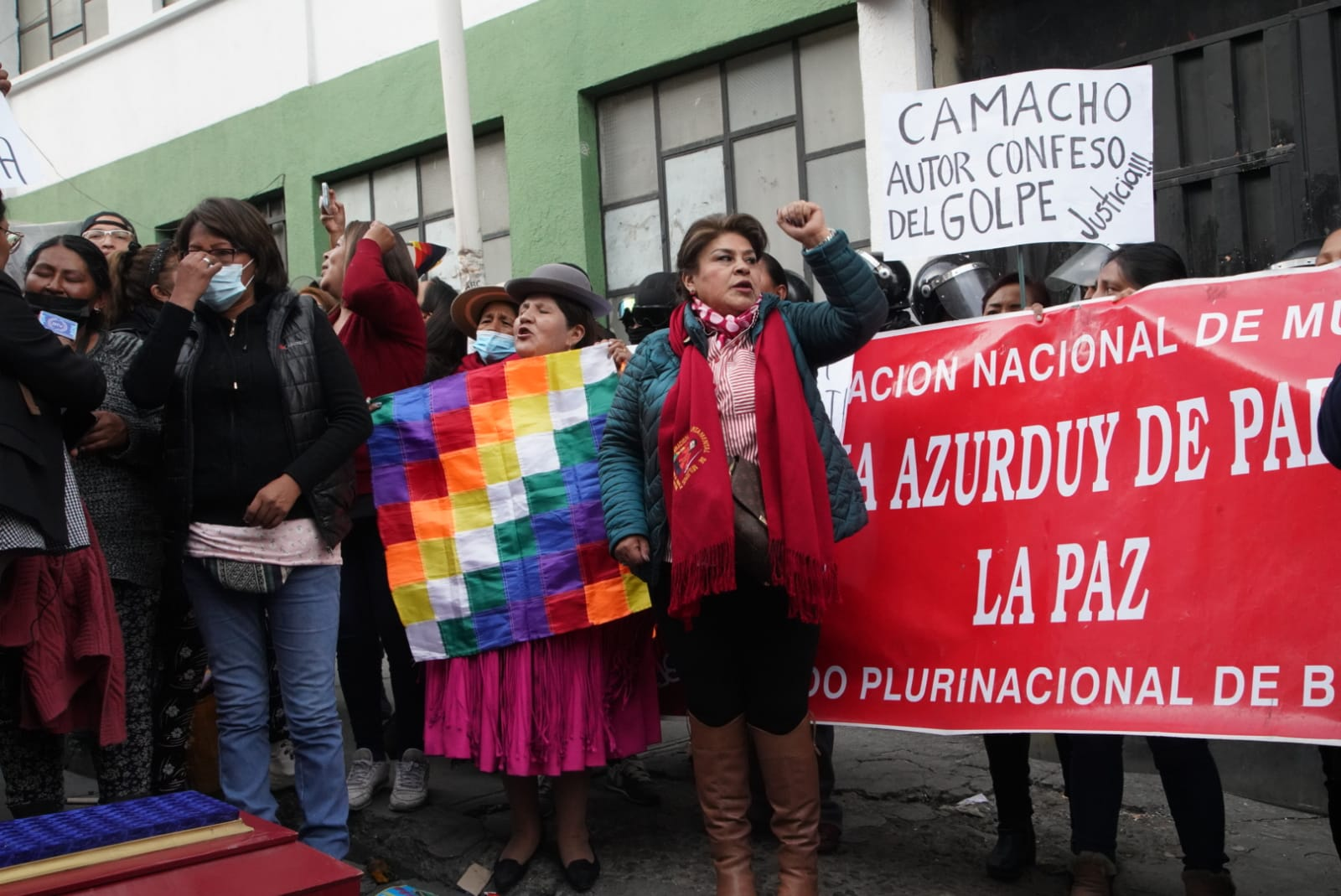
Some opponents expressed support for Camacho's arrest and demanded he be jailed.

Following Camacho's arrest, the Prosecutor's Office issued a public communiqué stating that the governor had been detained as part of Coup D'état I, the case investigating perpetrators of the alleged coup d'état that ousted Morales from power in 2019. "This legal decision is not a kidnapping or political persecution," the authority assured. Nonetheless, the move to detain a sitting governor was met with swift and heavy condemnation from members of the opposition. "This violent and illegal kidnapping of Governor [Luis Fernando] Camacho is outrageous. [It] violates constitutional and human rights principals," former president Carlos Mesa denounced. "What a way to pour hatred and revenge on the political situation of the country," lamented Iván Arias, mayor of La Paz.

==== Protests and strikes ====
Within hours of Camacho's apprehension, public protests erupted in Santa Cruz, as demonstrators initiated roadblocks and blockades along highways and streets, both in the provinces and the capital. In Santa Cruz de la Sierra, protesters gathered at Viru Viru International in an attempt to block the governor's transfer, forcing Boliviana de Aviación to suspend all flights to and fro. In what El Deber described as a "night of fury," mass protests swept through the region, with at least three buildings, including the Departmental Prosecutor's Office and the home of public works minister Edgar Montaño, being consumed by fires started by vandals. One person told The Guardian, "People were enraged."

An emergency Assembly of Cruceñidad was convened by the Pro-Santa Cruz Civic Committee on the afternoon of 29 December. In it, prominent civic leaders determined to carry out a twenty-four-hour strike the following day, a measure that included the closing of all border crossings to prevent "future kidnappings." The daylong strike in Santa Cruz went ahead relatively peacefully until the final hours of 30 December when demonstrating youths attempting to reach the Police Department clashed with law enforcement personnel near the Cristo Redentor monument in the city center. Protesters burned tires and lobbed firecrackers while some 200 police troops used tear gas in their efforts to guard their headquarters.

==== Succession ====
Aguilera stated, "The governor is Luis Fernando Camacho; the only manner in which someone can supplant the governor is what is established in Article 26 of our statute; none of that has happened." According to interior advisor Efraín Suárez, only a resignation, death, or—in Camacho's case—an enforceable criminal sentence could force the departmental government to replace him. Even if prosecutors did achieve a guilty verdict, "there is still the appeal, and the court of cassation, and then the constitutional amparo. The road is long."

This justification was partially rejected by members of the Supreme Electoral Tribunal, who argued that, though Camacho's situation did not disqualify him from being governor, it did constitute a "temporary absence or definitive impediment," which, per Article 25 of Santa Cruz's Autonomous Statute, means that the vice governor should assume office in an acting capacity. In that vein, Minister of Justice Iván Lima stated that the national government was predisposed toward taking criminal action for breach of duties should the departmental government refuse to swear in Aguilera. For his part, Suárez assured that it would be unnecessary for Aguilera to take office, as Camacho could simply continue exercising public functions from prison. "We [will] have a branch of the Governor's Office in Chonchocoro [prison]," he stated. In keeping with this promise, members of Camacho's cabinet made their first trip to La Paz on 4 January 2023, where they met with the governor to discuss policy matters.

=== Incarceration ===
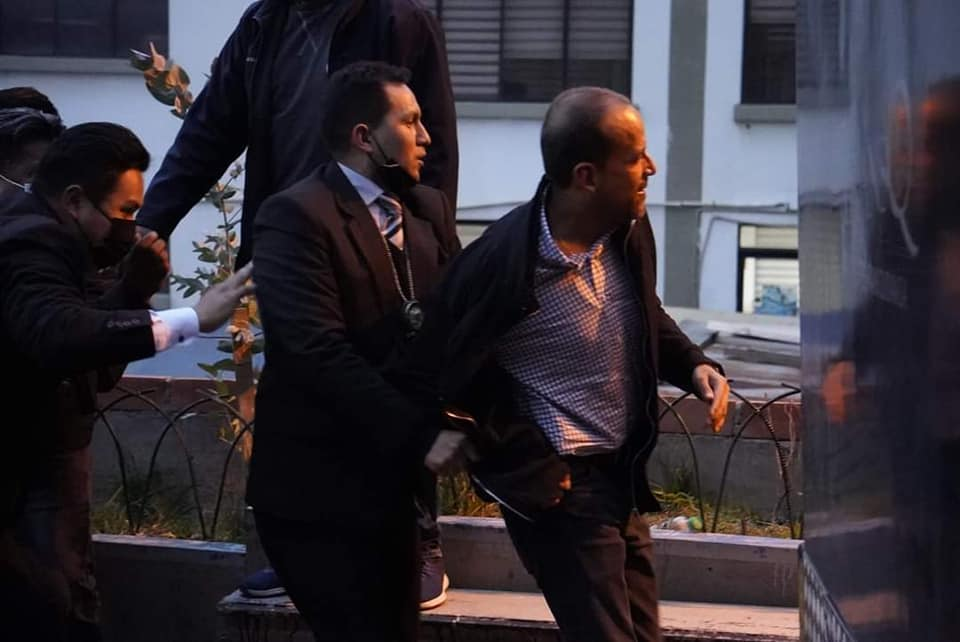
Law enforcement personnel transfer Camacho to police headquarters.

Camacho's whereabouts remained unknown for hours following his arrest. Finally, at around 6:15 p.m., he landed at El Alto International Airport, at which point he was quickly transferred to police headquarters in La Paz. When presented to the Prosecutor's Office, the governor refrained from giving a statement on the case. Instead, he used his sworn declaration to deliver a public message, stating that he was "proud ... to have been part of the biggest fight in the history of Bolivia for freedom and democracy ... I always maintained my position that I could recount said feat in my [sworn] declaration." A virtual hearing on Camacho's case began the following day, in which the Prosecutor's Office levied charges of terrorism against the governor and requested six months of preventive detention. For its part, Camacho's defense filed an appeal requesting that the governor's arrest be annulled on the grounds that his rights were violated; however, the complaint was quickly declared "unfounded" and thrown out. A separate appeal filed with a different court was also rejected the following day, as was a third one heard in early 2023.

Early on 30 December, Judge Sergio Pacheco of the Eighth Criminal Investigation Court of La Paz ruled that Camacho was "probably the author of the [alleged] crime of terrorism." For this, the judge imposed four months of preventative detention on the governor, to be carried out in Chonchocoro maximum security penitentiary. Shortly into his incarceration, Camacho began suffering severe health decompensation, as the combined forces of chronic illness, stress, and La Paz's high altitude caused him to undergo muscle and nerve paralysis. Despite requests from his family and lawyers, prison staff refused to transfer him to an outside hospital, all the while denying allegations that the governor had not been allowed access to internal medical care. Although his health later slightly improved, Camacho assured that, should he die, any blame would lie on President Arce.

On 16 August 2023, Camacho underwent different medical checks to determine if he needed to be transferred to a medical facility for attention due to his health problems. The team of doctors who examined him determined, on 31 August, that Camacho could remain in prison, with a strengthened treatment for his hypertension.

=== Criminal trial ===
Shortly after Camacho's apprehension, additional investigations into the governor's financial dealings during the 2019 crisis were opened by the government. According to Minister of Government Eduardo del Castillo, at least four "large financial movements" amounting to Bs 4.5 million took place between 5 November and 7 December 2019, consisting of Bs 2.1 million deposited into Camacho's personal account and Bs 2.4 million transferred into other people's accounts, including those of his family, aides, and—most notably—active military personnel. In particular, two transfers of undisclosed amounts were deposited into the account of Jorge Terceros, the then-head of the Bolivian Air Force. For del Castillo, this payment was "part of the financing of the coup d'état," a point disputed by Terceros's lawyer, Eusebio Vera, who stated that the funds were used in the purchase of fuel as part of an effort to transfer members of the Legislative Assembly to La Paz, where it was hoped they could help put an end to the crisis.

Following the presentation of this evidence, the government quickly moved to amplify its suit again Camacho and on 5 January 2023, the governor was hit with an additional two charges for the crimes of bribery and seduction of troops. On 19 January 2023, a judge in La Paz ordered Camacho to remain in prison until his trial, upholding a previous decision due to flight risk or obstruct the investigation. Prosecutor Omar Mejillones had argued that Camacho led to a "power vacuum" during the 2019 political crisis. Camacho was released from prison to house arrest on 26 August 2025. He returned to the Santa Cruz Department governor’s office to take over from deputy governor Mario Aguilera, who had been in charge of the department during Camacho’s absence.

== Electoral history ==
Electoral history of Luis Fernando Camacho
| Year | Office | Party | Alliance | Votes | | | Result | Ref. |
| Year | Office | Party | Alliance | Total | % | P. | Result | Ref. |
|---|---|---|---|---|---|---|---|---|
| 2020 | President | Independent | Creemos | 862,184 | 14.00% | 3rd | Lost | |
| 2021 | Governor | Creemos | None | 860,023 | 55.64% | 1st | Won | |
Source: Plurinational Electoral Organ | Electoral Atlas

Civic offices
| Preceded by Andrés Peñafiel | Second Vice President of the Pro-Santa Cruz Civic Committee; 2015–2017 | Succeeded by Zvonko Matković |
| Preceded by Fernando Cuéllar | First Vice President of the Pro-Santa Cruz Civic Committee; 2017–2019 | Succeeded by Rómulo Calvo |
| Preceded by Fernando Cuéllar | President of the Pro-Santa Cruz Civic Committee; 2019 | Succeeded by Rómulo Calvo |
Political offices
| Preceded by Rubén Costas | Governor of Santa Cruz; 2021–present | Incumbent |
