= Beni Department =

Department of northeastern Bolivia

Beni Departamento del Beni (Spanish)
- Department
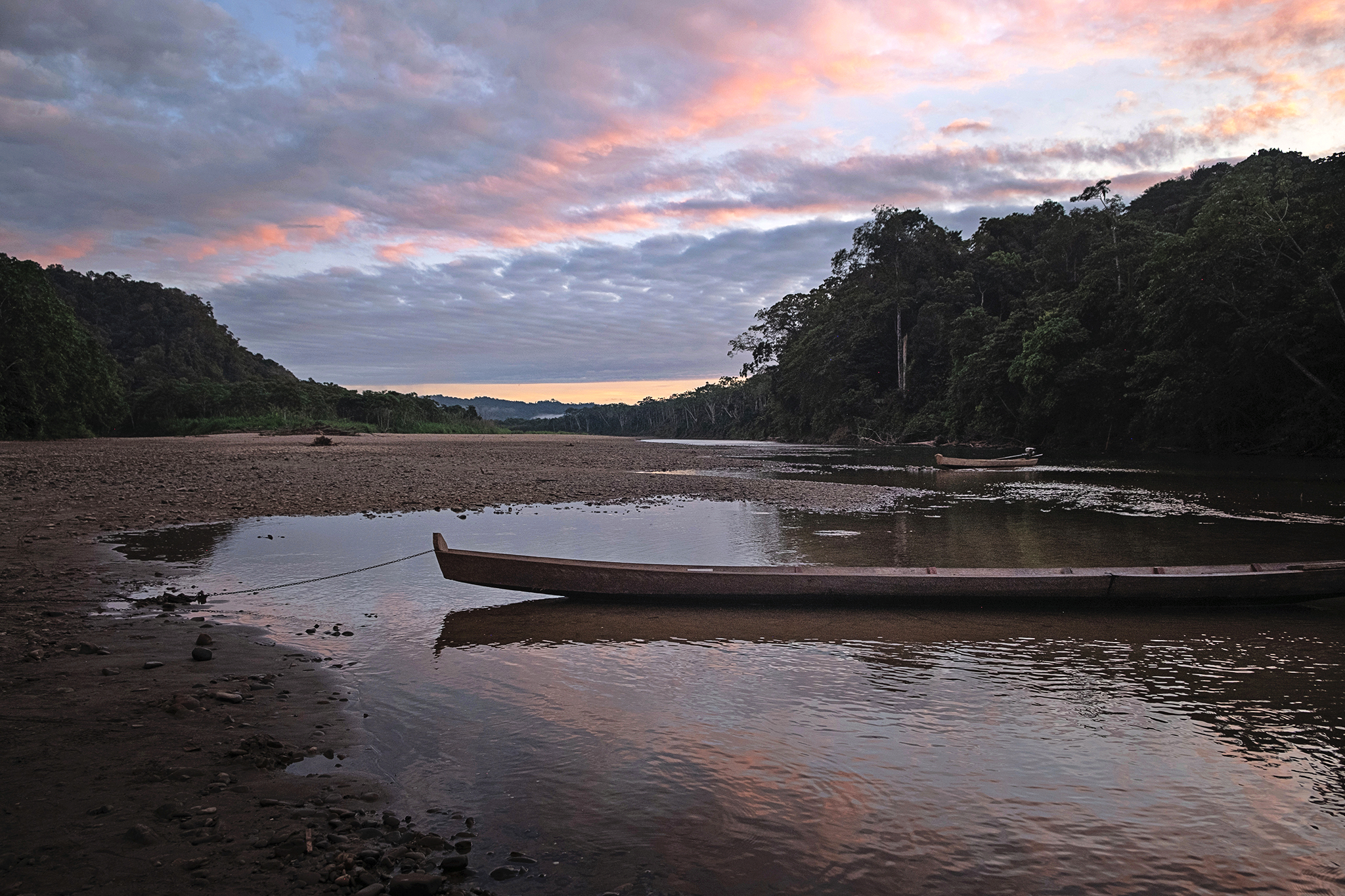
- Isiboro Sécure National Park

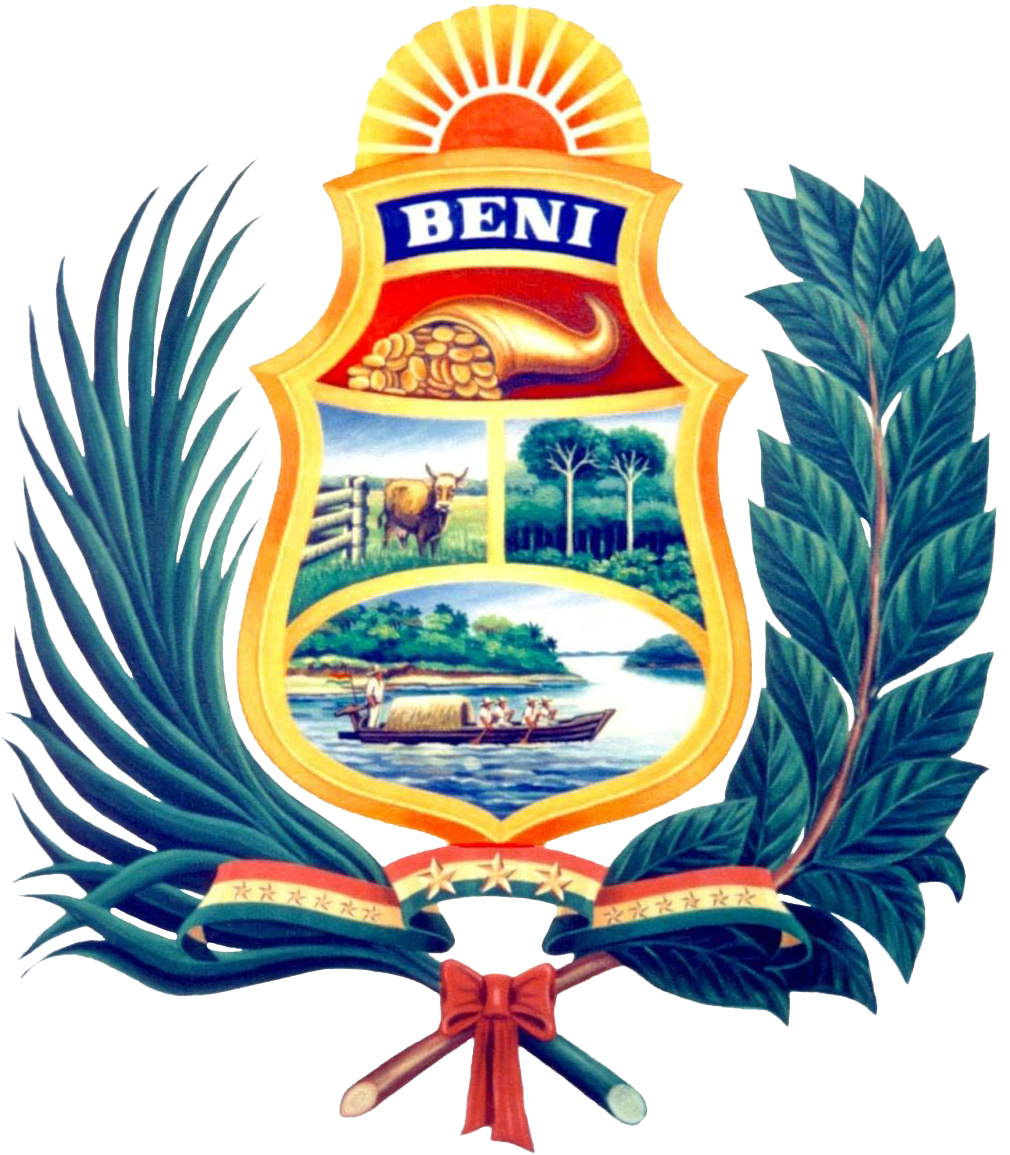
- Flag Coat of arms
- Motto: ¡Ventura, paz y unión! ("Fortune, peace and union!")
- Anthem: Canta victorioso pueblo de leyenda ("Sing victoriously, people of legend")
- Beni within Bolivia
- Coordinates: 14°S 65°W
- Country: Bolivia
- Created: November 18, 1842
- Founder: José Ballivián
- Capital: Trinidad

Government
  - Body: Departmental Legislative Assembly of Beni
  - Governor: Alejandro Unzueta (MTS)

Area
  - Total: 213,564 km^{2} (82,458 sq mi)
  - Rank: Place nº 2 (19.44%)
- Elevation (average): 155 m (509 ft)

Population (2024 census)
  - Total: 488,260
  - Rank: Place nº 8 (4.48%)
  - Density: 2.2862/km^{2} (5.9214/sq mi)

Languages
  - Official: Spanish, Moxeno
- Time zone: UTC-4 (BOT)
- Area code: + (591) 3
- ISO 3166 code: ISO 3166-2:BO
- Vehicle registration: BO-B
- HDI (2019): 0.725 high · 5th of 9
- GDP (2023): in 2015 constant values
- Total: US$ 1.2 billion Int$ 2.7 billion (PPP)
- Per capita: US$ 2,300; Int$ 5,400 (PPP)

Beni (Spanish pronunciation: [ˈbeni]), sometimes El Beni, is a northeastern department of Bolivia, in the lowlands region of the country. It is the second-largest department in the country (after Santa Cruz), covering 213,564 square kilometers (82,458 sq mi), and it was created by supreme decree on November 18, 1842, during the administration of General José Ballivián. Its capital is Trinidad.

== Etymology ==
The name of the department was given by President José Ballivián in honor of the Beni River. The name Beni is derived from the Movima word ben’i, meaning “grasslands”. However, a manuscript by Friar Nicolás Armentia states that the word Beni comes from the Tacanan languages, in which it means “wind.”

== Population ==
With a population of 488,260, according to the 2024 census, Beni is the second least-populated of the nine departments of Bolivia, after Pando.

Although Beni is rich in natural resources, the poverty level of its inhabitants is high, mainly as a result of centuries of exploitation of native populations by European-descended elites. The main economic activities are agriculture, timber, and cattle. In addition, an underground economy linked to illegal narcotics activities flourished in the area during the last decades of the 20th century, with many cocaine laboratories hidden behind the façade of remote cattle ranches.

The Beni region is wide and flat, featuring many large mounds connected by straight earthen causeways, which are believed by researchers to have been built by ancient inhabitants. The earthwork mounds provide raised living areas and enable the growth of trees that could not survive otherwise in the frequently flooded lowland area. In the 21st century, archeologists and anthropologists such as Americans Clark Erickson and William Balée, respectively, believe these earthwork structures are evidence of a large and sophisticated indigenous civilization that flourished for thousands of years before European colonization.

The first European settlers in this area were Spanish Jesuit missionaries during the 18th century, sent to convert the native inhabitants, chiefly in the southern half of the department. The religious origins of many of the Beni's towns can be attested to by the centrality of the local church in most of the communities, and in the very names of the towns: Trinidad, Santa Ana, San Borja, Reyes, etc. Today, the Beni region is the seat of the Roman Catholic Apostolic Vicariate of El Beni.

The importance of cattle ranching is prominent in the regional culture. Cowboys, or "vaqueros", still play an important role in Beni society, comprising a large portion of the working class. Other industries significant to the region include logging, small-scale fishing and hunting, farming, and in recent years, eco-tourism.

Though the Beni lies in the southern reaches of the Amazon Basin, an area renowned for tropical disease, the population has fewer health problems than in the Andes Region, especially those related to malnutrition.

The inhabitants (Benianos) are mostly descendants of Cruceños (people from Santa Cruz) who streamed north following the course of navigable rivers, and native peoples.

The Beniano diet consists largely of rice, bananas, beef, and fish. Some popular dishes include Majao, Masaco, and others, many featuring cured/salted meats.

The majority of the population in Beni is mestizo. The white/mestizo Benianos have traditionally been mistrustful, and often somewhat contemptuous, of Andean culture. They identify as being lighter skinned and of more Spanish ancestry than the Quechua and Aymara-speaking populations of the highlands. Considerable resentment existed against the central government, which allegedly did very little to build roads or integrate the Beni into the economy and political life of Bolivia. These attitudes persisted although Beni residents benefited greatly by the Agrarian Reform instituted following the 1952 Revolution, with many citizens gaining ownership of significant tracts of land. Most of these turned to cattle ranching. The absence of a reliable road linking the department to the main centers of power in the country (owing to the difficult terrain) continued to contribute to the Benianos' perception of isolation, as did a downturn in the cattle industry. As a result, both the white/mestizo population and departmental authorities supported the Santa Cruz-led effort to federalize the country and devolve powers to the departments at the expense of the central government. Considerable social unrest took place in 2007 and 2008, leading some to consider separatism as plausible.

Historical population
Year	Pop.	±% p.a.
1976	168,367	—
1992	276,174	+3.14%
2001	362,521	+3.07%
2012	422,008	+1.39%
2024	477,441	+1.03%
Source: Citypopulation

== History ==
Beni was a very important center of a pre-Columbian civilization known as the hydraulic culture of Las Lomas (the hills), a culture that constructed over 20,000 man-made artificial hills, all interconnected by thousands of square kilometers of aqueducts, channels, embankments, artificial lakes and lagoons, as well as terraces. Between about 4000 BC (and probably earlier as this date is taken from ceramics that have been carbon dated) and the 13th century AD this region was settled by sophisticated and organized groups of human societies. Their civil structures were based, both environmentally and economically, on the use of specific environmental characteristics (such as the use of aquatic plants as fertilizer, and enormous fishing systems they constructed). Miles of these channels and man-made earthworks are visible from the air when flying over Beni.

When the Spanish arrived, the region had already been in decline for about three hundred years. However, this is where many products that are now used worldwide originated in native cultivation: among them tobacco, peanuts, cotton, cassava (manioc), vanilla and sweet potatoes. The Spanish initially were intensely interested in this area. During the first century of colonization, they believed the mythical city of El Dorado (also known as Paititi) could be found in this region. However, they never found this legendary city of gold and they soon lost interest in the area, which would remain marginalized for several centuries after.

Between the 19th and 20th centuries northern Beni became Bolivia's rubber capital. The abundance of rubber trees attracted many people to the region, many of them adventurers and workers (many of whom were indigenous) to work in the huge rubber plantations that arose. The worldwide demand for rubber rose with industrialization and the use of automotive vehicles. For decades this was one of the most active, dynamic regions of Bolivia. Cachuela Esperanza was an important center for rubber exports as it is located along the shores of the Beni River. As a measure of its success, it had one of the best-equipped hospitals in Bolivia at the end of the 19th century. But these enormous rubber plantations all but disappeared by the end of the Second World War, as developers had been cultivating rubber introduced to plantations of Southeast Asia and Africa. Today many of the properties have been converted to cattle ranches. Only some small rubber producers still use the river to transport their production.

== Government ==
=== Executive offices ===
The chief executive office of Bolivia departments (since May 2010) is the governor, who is elected to office; until then, the office was called the prefect. Until 2006 the prefect was appointed by the president of Bolivia. As of 2011 Beni had an interim governor, Haysen Ribera Leigue, who was selected by the Departmental Legislative Assembly on 16 December 2011. Governor Ernesto Suárez Sattori, who was elected on 4 April 2010, was suspended following his indictment for irregular expenditures related to a power plant in San Borja, Beni, in compliance with a Bolivian legal mandate that indicted officials may not continue to serve. As a replacement for the governor Carmelo Lens was elected in the special election on 20 January 2013. The current governor, Alejandro Unzueta of the MTS was elected on 7 March 2021.

Took office	Office expired	Prefect/governor	Party	Notes
23 Jan 2006	30 Aug 2007	Ernesto Suárez Sattori	PODEMOS	First elected prefect. Elected in Bolivian general election, December 2005
4 Jan 2010	30 May 2010	Clemente Clemente Sanjinés		Interim; final prefect
1 June 2010	16 Dec 2011	Ernesto Suárez Sattori	Beni First	Elected in regional election on 4 April 2010; first governor. Suspended under indictment.
16 Dec 2011	1 Mar 2013	Haisen Ribera Leigue	MNR (Note: MNR members of the Departmental Legislative Assembly, including Ribera, have been derecognized by the party since joining the MAS majority in 2010.)	Chosen as interim governor by the Departmental Legislative Assembly, supported by the MNR and MAS-IPSP.
1 Mar 2013	7 Feb 2014	Carmelo Lens	Beni First	Elected in the first round of the Beni special gubernatorial election on 20 January 2013.
5 May 2015	13 Nov 2019	Alex Ferrier Abidar	MAS	Elected in the first round of the Beni extraordinary election on 5 May 2015.
13 Nov 2019	12 Jul 2020	Fanor Amapo Yubanera	Independent	Appointed by the Departmental Legislative Assembly of Beni upon the resignation of Alex Ferrier Abidar in connection to the 2019 Bolivian political crisis. First indigenous governor of Beni.
12 Jul 2020	20 Aug 2020	Yáscara Moreno Flores	Movimiento Al Socialismo (MAS)	Appointed by the Departmental Legislative Assembly of Beni upon removal of Fanor Amapo Yubanera due to allegations of corruption.
20 Aug 2020	3 May 2021	Fanor Amapo Yubanera	Independent	Reinstated by the Departmental Court of Justice of Beni.
3 May 2021		José Alejandro Unzueta Shiriqui	Third System Movement (MTS)	Elected in the first round of the regional election on 7 March 2021.

=== Legislative Assembly ===
Under the 2009 Constitution, each Bolivian department has an elected Departmental Legislative Assembly. The first elections were held 4 April 2010. The leading party in the twenty-eight member assembly is Beni First, with 11 seats. The Movement towards Socialism (MAS-IPSP) holds 10 seats, and the Revolutionary Nationalist Movement (MNR) holds 3 seats. Two seats each were selected by indigenous people and by peasants through usos y costumbres. In alliance with the indigenous and peasant representatives, the MAS-IPSP controls the presidency of the Assembly. The three MNR representatives and their alternates were derecognized by the national party in 2010 when they backed MAS-IPSP policies and leadership.

The December 2011 suspension of Governor Ernesto Suarez was backed by 15 votes, including the MAS and MNR delegations, and two indigenous or campesino representatives. Two members of the assembly were also indicted simultaneously and replaced by their alternates: Sonia Suárez Araúz (MNR) was replaced by Juan Carlos Herrera; and Carlos Navia Ribera (MAS-IPSP) was replaced by Tatiana Paniagua Zabala. The interim governor was also a member of the Assembly.

=== National Congress ===
In the National Congress of Bolivia Beni elects nine out of 130 members of the Cámara de Diputados (Chamber of Deputies), and four members of the Cámara de Senadores (Chamber of Senators).

Senators

- Freddy Bersatti Tudela (MAS-IPSP)
- Zonia Guardia Melgar (MAS-IPSP)
- Carlos Alberto Sonnenschein Antelo (PPB)
- Jeanine Áñez Chávez (PPB)

== Geography ==
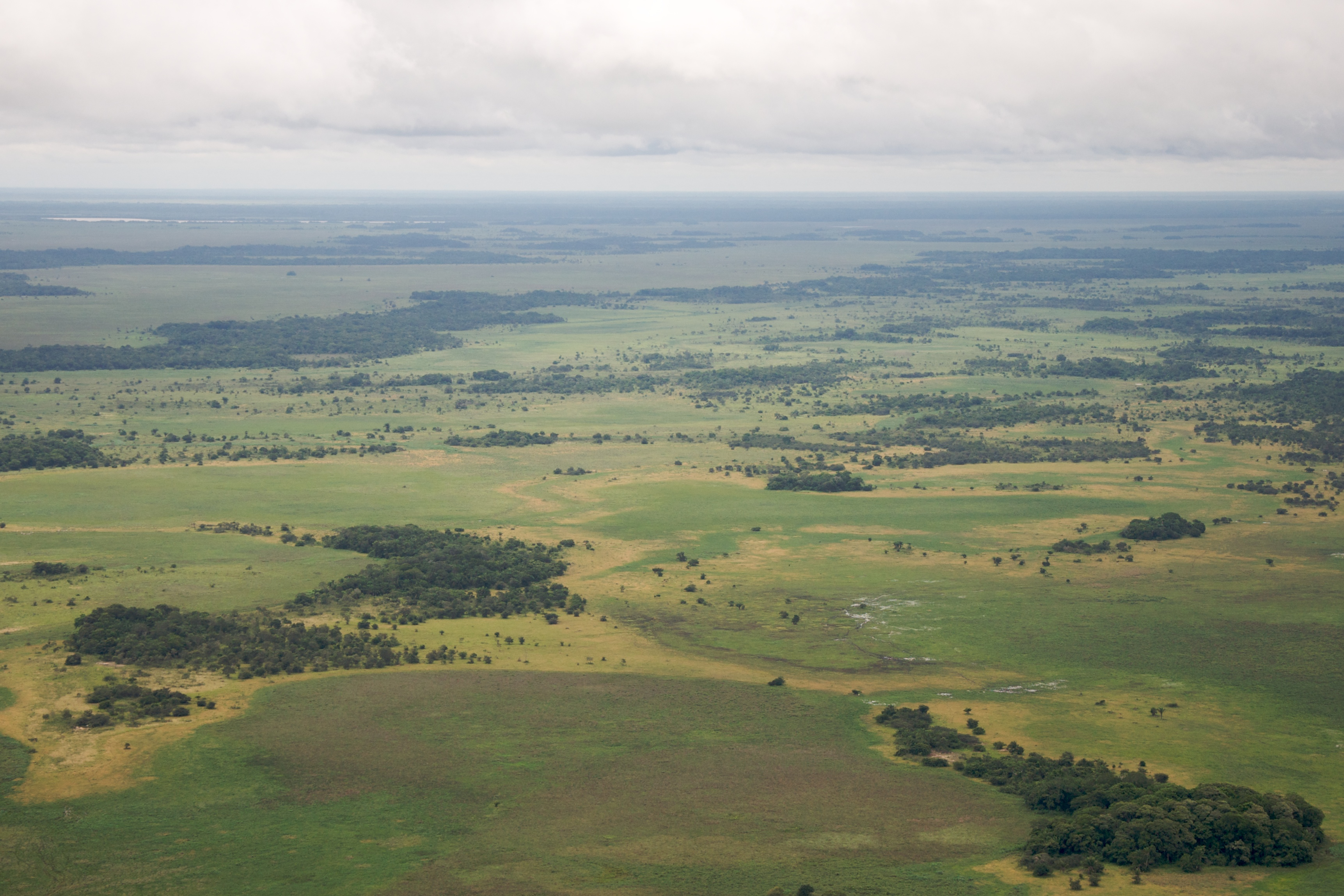
Beni savanna

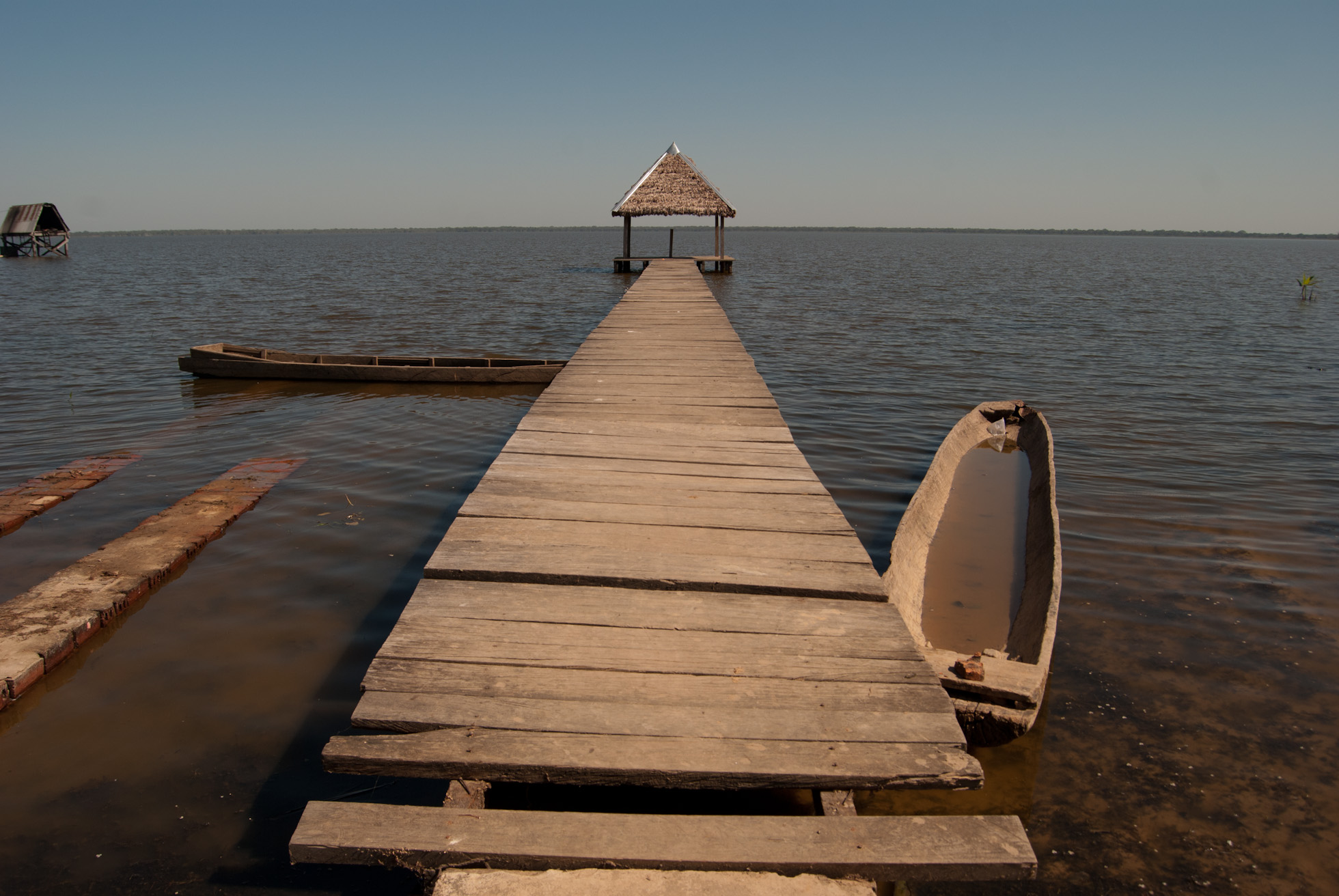
San Ignacio de Moxos

Beni's weather is tropical and humid, with a prevalence of warm to hot temperatures.

Beni borders upon Brazil to the northeast, and the departments of Santa Cruz to the southeast, La Paz to the west, Pando to the northwest, and Cochabamba to the south. Beni's territory is mainly covered by rainforest (particularly the northern and eastern portions of the department) and pampa (notably the grassland Moxos Plain to the south, closer to the Andean reaches). Much of Beni is at about 155 meters above sea level. Although most of the department is flat, along the border with La Paz there are two sierra chains called Eva Eva and Pelado. Beni is criss-crossed by numerous rivers, all of which are Amazon tributaries. The largest of these are the Iténez (also known as Guaporé), Mamoré, Madre de Dios, Madera, Yata, Ivón, Machupo, Itonama, Baures, San Martín, San Miguel, San Simón, Negro, Sécure, Yacuma, Maniquí, Ibare and Apere, all of which are navigable. Beni also has numerous lakes and lagoons. The most important of these are: Laguna Suárez, Rogagua, Rogaguado, San Luis, San Pablo, Huachi, Huatunas, Yusala, Huachuna, Agua Clara, Ginebra, La Dichosa, Bolivia, Navidad, Las Abras, Larga, Maracaibo and Aquiles Lake.

=== Flora and fauna ===
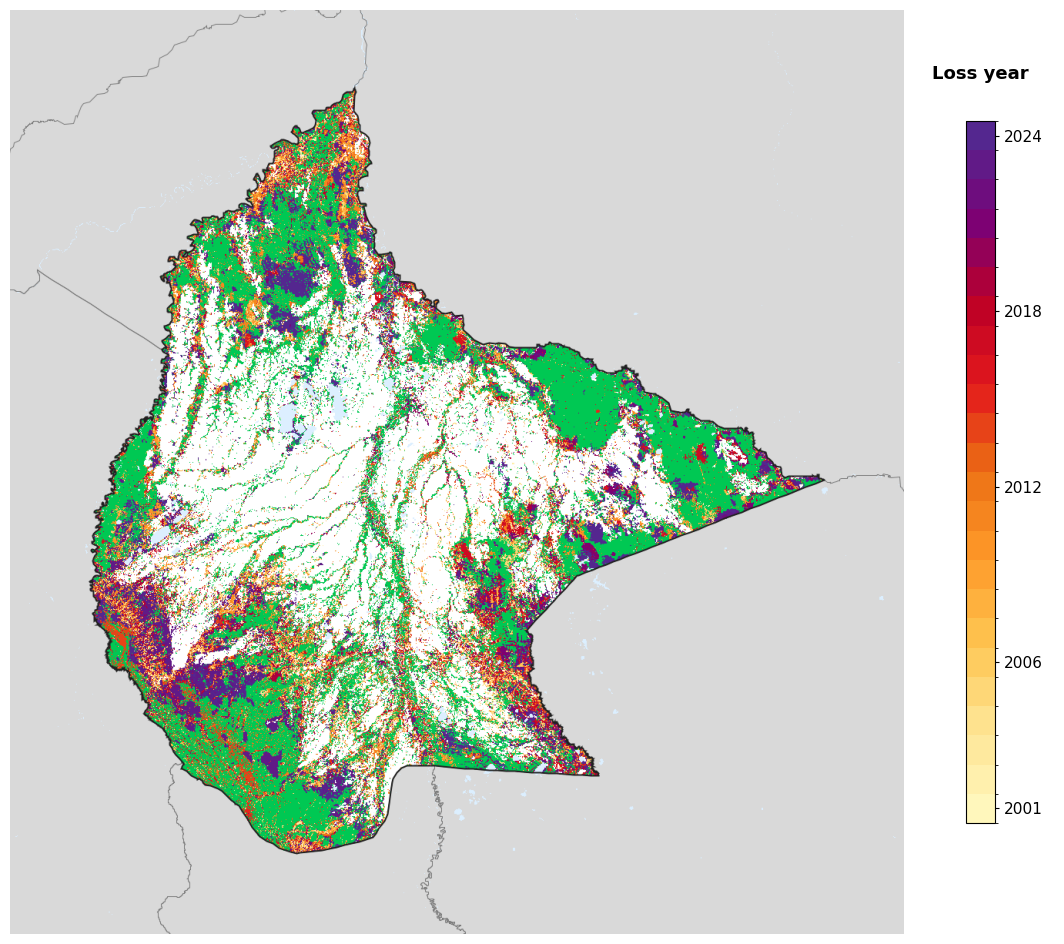
Tree-cover loss year in Beni, 2001-2024, from the Global Forest Change dataset.

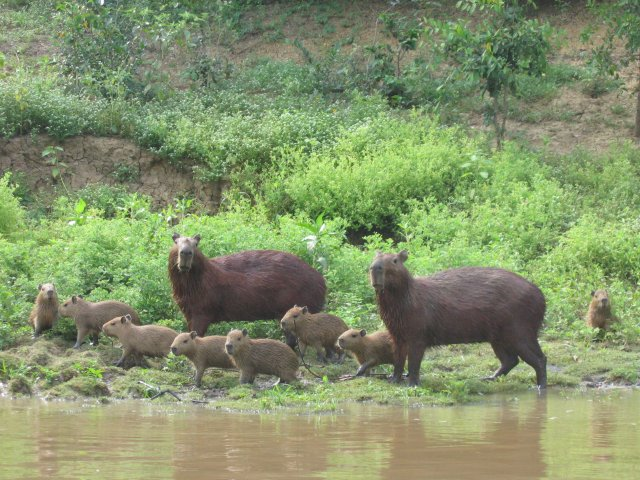
Capybara family in the region of Rurrenabaque, Beni Dept.

In the region's many rivers over 400 species of fish have been found. Trinidad has an entire museum, the Museo Ictícola, dedicated to Beni's fish fauna which is the third largest of its type in South America. The most commonly fished and consumed species are pacú, tambaquí, surubí, palometa (a type of piranha), sábalo, bagre (catfish), and blanquillo. Alligators are also hunted for their leather and meat, which is considered a delicacy and is a common part of meals in Beni. Beni now also exports huge amounts of lumber, although over the past 20 years the government of Bolivia has worked with numerous international entities and NGOs to certify its lumber concessions and all lumber exported must be accompanied by certificates of origin.

Conservation funding tied to Bolivia’s 1987 debt-for-nature swap, implemented by Conservation International Bolivia, supported conservation in the Beni region, including the Beni Biosphere Reserve.

=== Climate ===
Beni is hot and humid during most of the year with an annual rainfall average between 1,000–4,000 mm (39–157 in). It is one of the wettest regions in Bolivia, with more wetlands than the better-known Pantanal. During the winter (June and July) the weather can be cool and winds blowing northward from the South Pole and Argentina's Patagonia region can cause temperatures to drop quite drastically very quickly.

== Agriculture and livestock ==
Because of its climate and rich soils, the department is Bolivia's second largest agricultural center after Santa Cruz. There are extensive fields of corn, yucca (manioc), sunflowers, rice, and many tropical fruits such as cacao (from which chocolate is made), Brazil nuts (one of the regions main crops and exports), soybeans, bananas, maracuya, guayaba, papaya, and many other citrus fruits. Coffee is also grown extensively. Beni is also the second Bolivia's largest cattle-ranching region. Official estimates calculate there are anywhere between 2 and 2.5 million heads of cattle throughout the year. Most of these are turned out to pasture and thus are naturally fed.

== Provinces of Beni ==
The department is divided into 8 provinces which are further subdivided into municipalities and 48 cantons.

Province	Population (2024 census)	Area (km^{2})	Capital	Map
Cercado	136,502	12,276	San Javier	
Vaca Díez	152,333	22,434	Riberalta	
José Ballivián	89,638	40,444	Santos Reyes	
Yacuma	26,100	34,686	Santa Ana del Yacuma	
Moxos	21,584	33,316	San Ignacio de Moxos	
Marban	19,839	15,126	Loreto	
Mamoré	13,388	18,706	San Joaquín	
Iténez	24,903	36,576	Magdalena	

== Demography ==
According to the 2024 Bolivian census, the population of the Department of Beni is 488,260 inhabitants.

=== Historical population ===
Censuses prior to 1882 are not entirely accurate or reliable, as they provide only estimates and do not precisely reflect the departmental population of that period. Only from 1882 onward, after the end of the War of the Pacific are precise population data available for each department of Bolivia.

The population of the department increased by almost sevenfold between 1950 and 2024:

Historical population of the Department of Beni
Year	Population	Source
1831	41,228	Bolivian census of 1831
1845	48,406	Bolivian census of 1845
1854	114,922	Bolivian census of 1854
1882	16,744	Bolivian census of 1882
1900	32,180	Bolivian census of 1900
1950	71,636	Bolivian census of 1950
1976	168,367	Bolivian census of 1976
1992	276,174	Bolivian census of 1992
2001	362,521	Bolivian census of 2001
2012	422,008	Bolivian census of 2012
2024	488,260	Bolivian census of 2024

=== Immigration ===
As with other departments, the Department of Beni has received immigrants from different parts of Bolivia as well as from other countries around the world.

Residents originally from La Paz have become one of the largest communities within the department. Other significant groups include residents from Santa Cruz, Pando, and Cochabamba.

=== Population density ===
The Department of Beni is one of the least densely populated departments in Bolivia. Its low population density is due to its vast territory of forests, plains, and areas that are difficult to access.

- Area: Approximately 213,564 km², making it the second-largest department in the country.
- Population: According to the 2024 Bolivian census, the department had approximately 488,000 inhabitants.
- Population density: About 2.8 inhabitants per km², reflecting a low concentration of population, mainly due to the region’s geographic characteristics (forests, rivers, and wetlands).

=== Urban and rural population ===
- Urban population: Approximately 356,661 (73%) of Beni’s population lives in urban areas, mainly in the city of Trinidad and other important localities such as Riberalta, Guayaramerín, and San Borja.
- Rural population: Around 131,599 (27%) lives in dispersed rural areas, where Indigenous communities play an important role.

=== Migration and growth ===
The Department of Beni has experienced relatively low population growth compared to other departments of Bolivia. Limited employment opportunities and living conditions in many rural areas have encouraged internal migration, especially toward more industrialized departments such as Santa Cruz and La Paz.

=== Age distribution ===
The age structure of the Department of Beni reflects a young population, similar to other regions of Bolivia. However, in rural areas, birth rates are higher than in urban zones.

- Children and adolescents (0–14 years): totalled 161,402 or around 33% of the population
- Young adults (15–39 years): totalled 200,476 or approximately 41%
- Older adults (40 years and over): totalled 126,382, the remaining 26%

=== Challenges and development ===
The department faces significant development challenges, including a lack of adequate infrastructure and limited access to education and health services in the most remote areas. These constraints have contributed to maintaining low population density and a demographic structure that remains predominantly rural.

== Languages ==
The dominant language in the department is Spanish. The following table shows the number of those belonging to the recognized group of speakers.

Language	Department	Bolivia
Quechua	8,643	2,281,198
Aymara	7,910	1,525,321
Guaraní	396	62,575
Another native	16,695	49,432
Spanish	331,547	6,821,626
Foreign	6,512	250,754
Only native	7,854	960,491
Native and Spanish	24,171	2,739,407
Spanish and foreign	307,680	4,115,751

== Places of interest ==
- Beni Biological Station Biosphere Reserve
- Isiboro Sécure National Park and Indigenous Territory
- Cachuela Esperanza
- Pilón Lajas Biosphere Reserve and Communal Lands

== See also ==
- Beni River
- Beni savanna
- Guayaramerín
- Cachimbo Lake
- Guaporé River
- Mamoré River
- Moxos people
- Puente San Pablo
- San Jorge Lake
- Yuracaré
