= Reinado Internacional del Café 2008 =

Beauty pageant edition

Reinado Internacional del Café 2008, was held in Manizales, Colombia on January 12, 2008. 21 contestants attended the event. The winner was Jessica Jordan from Bolivia.

== Results ==
Final results	Contestant
Reina Internacional del Café 2008	Bolivia - Jessica Jordan
Virreina Internacional del Café 2008	Uruguay - Camila Fernández
1sr runner-up	Venezuela - Mónica Besereni
2nd runner-up	Dominican Republic - Claudia Peña
3rd runner-up	Panama - Ginelle Saldaña
Top 10	Colombia - Ludivia Díaz; Germany - Svetlana Tsys; Honduras - Alejandra Mendoza; Mexico - Georgina Holguín; Puerto Rico - Yesenia Avilés

== Contestants ==
Country	Contestant	Age	Height (cm)	Height (ft)	Hometown
Argentina	Lucía Ugarte	20	162	5'1"	Buenos Aires
Aruba	Tracey Nicolaas	19	172	5'8"	Tanki Leendert
Bolivia	Jessica Jordan	22	175	5'9"	Santa Cruz
Brazil	Loraine Navarro	21	179	5'11"	Araraquara
Canada	Elena Semikina	24	182	6'0"	Toronto
Chile	Romina Piña	22	170	5'7"	Ñuñoa
Colombia	Ludibia Díaz	20	171	5'7"	Florencia
Dominican Republic	Claudia Peña	20	178	5'10"	Bonao
El Salvador	Gabriela Echeverría	20	173	5'8"	Sensuntepeque
Germany	Svetlana Tsys	18	181	5'11"	Berlin
Guatemala	Hamy Tejeda	23	177	5'10"	Guatemala City
Honduras	Alejandra Mendoza	17	175	5'9"	El Progreso
Mexico	Georgina Holguín	22	175	5'9"	Chihuahua
Panama	Ginelle Saldaña	23	175	5'9"	Panama City
Paraguay	Karen Alvarez	24	180	5'11"	Ciudad del Este
Peru	Yolanda Raygada	23	172	5'8"	Lima
Puerto Rico	Yesenia Avilés	23	180	5'11"	Arecibo
Spain	Cintia Martínez	21	175	5'9"	Barcelona
Uruguay	Camila Fernández	18	180	5'11"	Salto
United States	Katherine Cartagena	18	175	5'9"	New York City
Venezuela	Mónica Besereni	21	174	5'8"	Maracay
