= Esteban Urquizu =

Bolivian politician (born 1981)

Esteban Urquizu Cuéllar
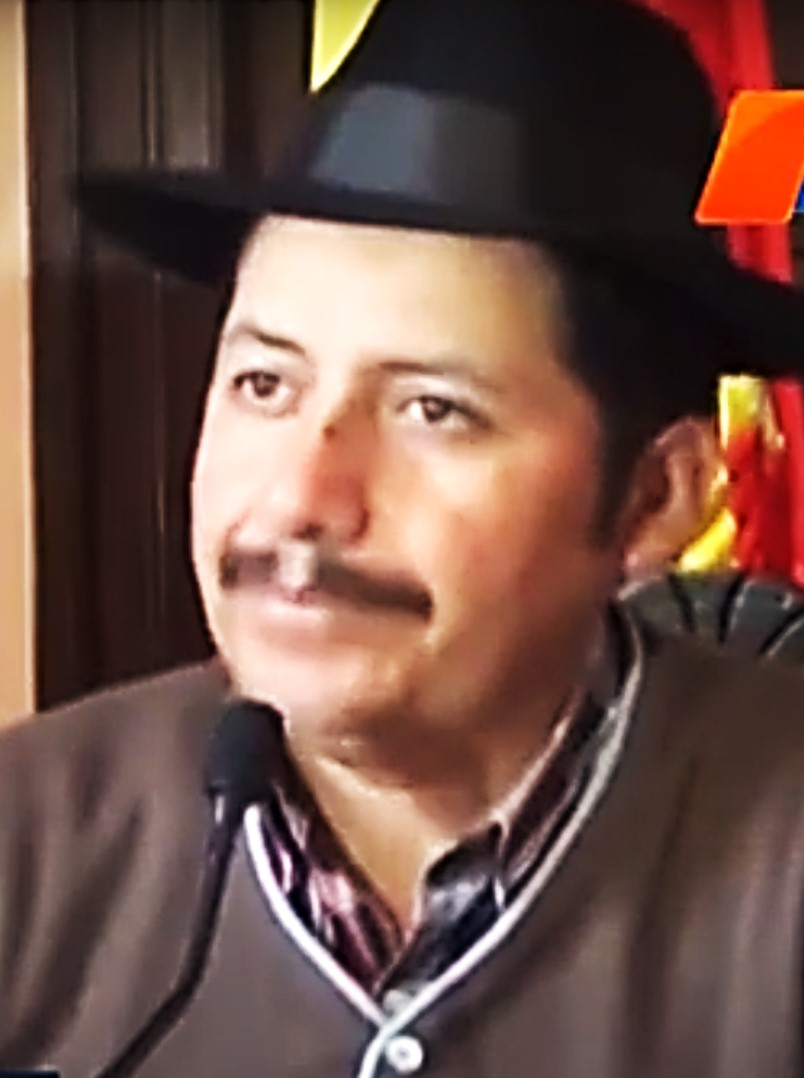
- Urquizu in 2018

Governor of Chuquisaca
- In office May 2010 – 2015

Personal details
- Born: April 11, 1981 (age 45) Yamparáez, Chuquisaca, Bolivia
- Party: MAS

Esteban Urquizu Cuéllar (born April 11, 1981, in Yamparáez Province) is a peasant leader, governor of Chuquisaca, and the youngest governor in Bolivia. He is affiliated with the Movement for Socialism (MAS), for which he previously served as a member of the Constituent Assembly. He won the 2010 gubernatorial election in Chuquisaca with 53.6% of the vote. Previously, he led the Chuquisaca Peasant Worker Federation. His wife is Alejandra Picha and former Prefect (a post new replaced with the governorship) of Chuquisaca. Savina Cuéllar is his aunt.
