= Jessica Jordan =

Bolivian beauty pageant titleholder

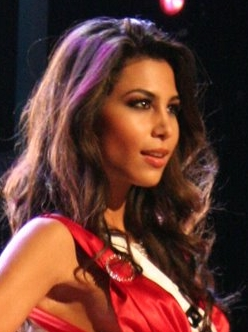
- Born: Jessica Anne Jordan Burton; 6 May 1984 (age 41); Bath, England, UK
- Occupations: Model, politician
- Title: Miss Bolivia 2007; Reinado Internacional del Café 2008

Jessica Anne Jordan Burton (born 6 May 1984) is a Bolivian-British politician, model and beauty pageant titleholder who was crowned Miss Bolivia 2007 and also represented Bolivia at Miss Universe 2007 pageant in Mexico City.

== Biography ==
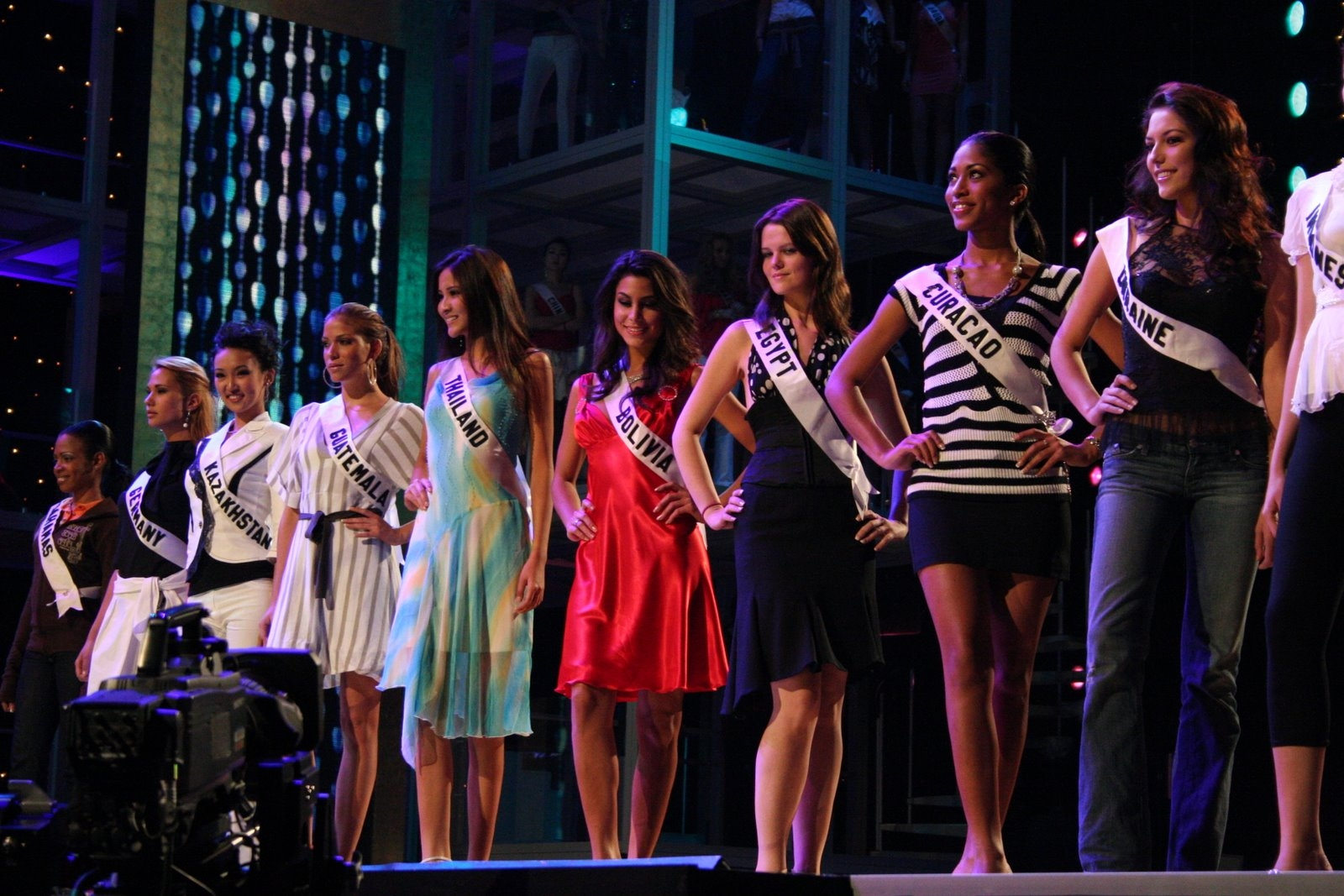
Jordan at Miss Universe 2007

Jordan is the only child of an English father and a Bolivian mother, Aida Burton. Her father, Andrew Keith Jordan is a petroleum engineer. In addition to Bolivia, she also lived in England, Scotland, the US and Brazil. In her youth, she was very interested in sport and traveling and her mother worried that she was a bit too 'tomboyish' and not 'girly' enough. At about 16 years of age her mother enrolled her into modelling classes, which Jessica found she enjoyed. As a result, she went on to participate in numerous fashion competitions in Europe the US and Mexico as well as having succeeded in many beauty competitions. These include Miss Mundo Latina, which she won in Miami in 2003. Jordan succeeded Desiree Durán who won the Miss Bolivia title in 2005, and Miss Bolivia Universe in 2006. In addition, she was crowned Reina Internacional del Café 2008.

Jordan acquired an interest in politics from her mother and states that she always wanted to help her country. Her pageant title gave her the opportunity to meet people of influence, which culminated in her meeting the country's president, Evo Morales. President Morales invited her to stand for governor in the very marginal constituency of Beni, in which the President's party Movimiento Al Socialismo (MAS) had previously lost by 25,000 votes. She lost but won more than 40% (some 60,000 votes), losing by 2,900 votes. (having narrowed the gap).

After the election, the President asked Jordan to become the representative of the Agency for Macro-Regions and Border Zones (Agencia de las Macrorregiones y Zonas Fronterizas; Ademaf) in Beni. In September 2012, the MAS renominated her as candidate for governor of Beni in the 2013 special election. Jordan was defeated by Carmelo Lens of the Beni First party, who won a 52.27% majority ahead of her second-place finish with 60,382 votes (44,35%).

Preceded by Vanessa Morón	Miss Bolivia Earth; 2006	Succeeded by Carla Fuentes
Preceded by Desiree Durán	Miss Bolivia; 2007	Succeeded by Katherine David
Preceded by Fabriella Quesada	Reinado Internacional del Café; 2008	Succeeded by Alejandra Mesa
