= Edgar Fernández =

Bolivian politician (born 1971)

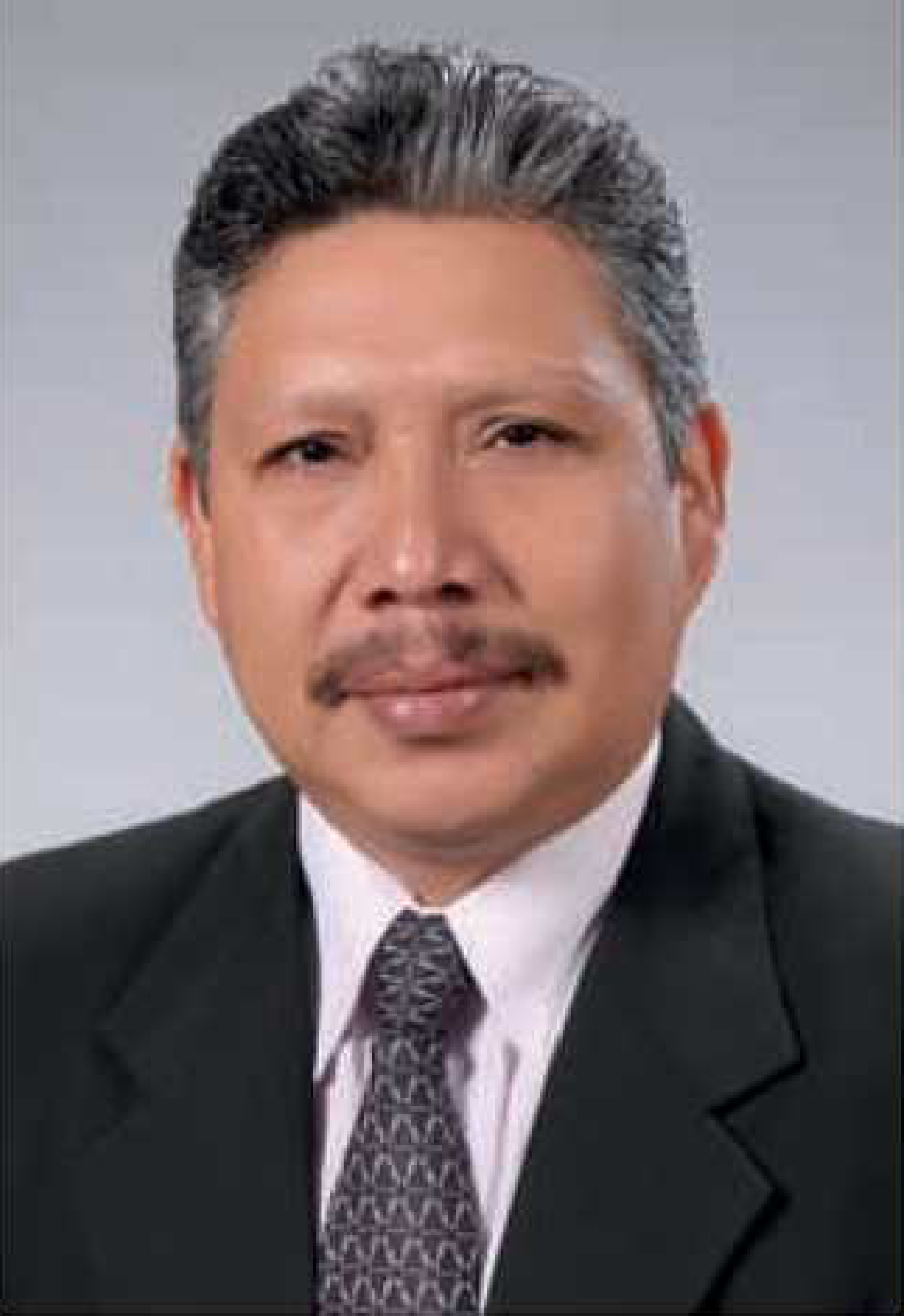
- Official portrait, 2014

Member of the Chamber of Deputies from Santa Cruz
- In office 19 January 2010 – 18 January 2015
- Substitute: Gladys Aguilar
- Preceded by: Bismarck Soruco
- Succeeded by: Miguel Ángel Feeney
- Constituency: Party list

Personal details
- Born: Edgar Luis Fernández; 11 November 1971 (age 54) Totora, Cochabamba, Bolivia
- Party: Movement for Socialism (2001–present)
- Occupation: Cab driver; politician; trade unionist

Edgar Luis Fernández (born 11 November 1971) is a Bolivian cab driver, politician, and trade unionist who served as a party-list member of the Chamber of Deputies from Santa Cruz from 2010 to 2015.

Born in Totora, Fernández spent most of his life residing in Santa Cruz de la Sierra. He settled in the city's Plan 3,000 district, where he got his start providing share taxi services. At age 18, Fernández joined his local drivers' syndicate, progressively rising through the union's ranks throughout the early 2000s.

A member of the Movement for Socialism since 2001, Fernández actively worked to align his sector's unions with the party, resulting in a long-lasting political alliance. After two failed runs for public office in 2004 and 2005, Fernández was elected to represent the Santa Cruz Department in the Chamber of Deputies in 2009. He was not nominated for reelection.

== Early life and career ==
=== Early life and education ===
Edgar Fernández was born on 11 November 1971 to Guemersindo Montaño and Juana Fernández. (Note: Fernández never met his father and, hence, chooses only to carry his maternal surname.) Although born in Totora, a rural town in the Carrasco Province of Cochabamba, he spent most of his life in the Santa Cruz Department, having moved there with his mother at the age of 1. The two settled in Santa Cruz de la Sierra, one of the primary zones of economic opportunity in the country since the latter half of the twentieth century. There, his mother set up shop as a merchant, with Fernández taking up a job at a local noodle factory around age 9. Simultaneously, he attended the city's San Martín School, studying up to middle grade before financial constraints forced him to drop out.

=== Trade unionism ===
Between ages 14 and 15, Fernández fulfilled his term of mandatory military service. Upon his return home, he briefly resumed his factory job before relocating to Santa Cruz's Plan 3,000 district in 1987. The municipal district was a hub of lower-class immigration to the city, mostly by migrants from the western departments. There, Fernández began working as a cab driver in the employment of some family members, taking night shifts as he lacked a license at the time. Using money he saved from his factory job, he was able to buy his own minibus, which he operated as a share taxi. Through that, he eventually came to own his own bus route.

Fernández became affiliated with Santa Cruz's urban drivers' unions at the age of 18 when he joined the 24 de Septiembre Microbus and Taxi Syndicate. He got his start as head of one of Plan 3,000's taxi routes, later serving for two terms as secretary of transportation of routes 47, 62, and 94 between 2001 and 2002 before being elected president of said routes four consecutive times between 2005 and 2008. During this time, he also served as his organization's secretary of conflicts from 2003 to 2005. Fernández capped off his rise through the ranks of the sector's trade unions in 2006 when he was elected president of the Plan 3,000 Urban Drivers' Bloc, representing twenty-two of the area's workers' organizations and affiliated route owners.

== Chamber of Deputies ==
=== Election ===
Since the district's formation, Plan 3,000's predominantly disadvantaged population made it a center of proletarian opposition to Santa Cruz's economic elite. Throughout the early 2000s, this fact was harnessed by the nascent Movement for Socialism (MAS-IPSP) into popular support for the party, converting the district into one of its primary partisan bases in the Santa Cruz Department. Fernández, for his part, first joined the MAS in 2001, around the same time that he had begun forming a political wing to represent the drivers' unions.

The confluence of these two groups – the MAS and the drivers' unions – generated a lasting political alliance, one whose vote-getting power was first put to the test at the municipal level in 2004 and at the regional in 2005. On the first occasion, Fernández contested a seat on the Santa Cruz Municipal Council but was unsuccessful. A subsequent nomination for a party-list seat in the Chamber of Deputies in the following year's general election also ended in failure. In both cases, the MAS's incipient presence in Santa Cruz prevented it from attaining significant legislative representation.

Despite these initial losses, Fernández and the drivers' union's alliance with the MAS solidified from 2005 on and continued through ensuing election cycles. In 2009, the country's national drivers' federation elected to lend its full support to the party, a pact that garnered the sector a quota of candidacies for its representatives in all nine departments. In Santa Cruz, Fernández was again put forward for a seat in the lower chamber, representing the 16 de Noviembre Federation of Unionized Drivers, a syndicate composed of fifty-six affiliated drivers' unions. Unlike in previous years, Fernández exited victorious, owing to the MAS's steadily improving performance in the Santa Cruz Department, achieved through the consolidation of a multifaceted base of support composed of lower-class urbanites, western migrant settlers, and lowland indigenous peoples.

=== Tenure ===
Fernández spent the entirety of his parliamentary term sitting on the lower chamber's Government, Defense, and Armed Forces Commission. Of his five years in office, four were spent as chair of the Government and Bolivian Police Committee, the exception being in 2012, when he briefly served on the Fight Against Drug Trafficking Committee.^{[§]} In legislation, Fernández helped pen multiple bills relating to public security as well as those covering the needs of the transportation sector – most notably, the General Law on Transport, enacted in 2011.

Although Fernández was not nominated for reelection at the end of his term, the sector he represented maintained its close links with the MAS as well as its positions of power within the Legislative Assembly. After leaving office, Fernández retired to Santa Cruz, where he continued to exercise leadership over Plan 3,000's urban drivers' unions into the early 2020s.

=== Commission assignments ===
- Government, Defense, and Armed Forces Commission
  - Government and Bolivian Police Committee (Secretary: 2010–2012, 2013–2015)
  - Fight Against Drug Trafficking Committee (2012–2013)

== Electoral history ==
Electoral history of Edgar Fernández
Year	Office	Party	Votes			Result	Ref.
Year	Office	Party	Total	%	P.	Result	Ref.
2004	Councillor	Movement for Socialism	34,063	9.51%	4th	Lost	(Note: Presented on an electoral list. The data shown represents the share of the vote the entire party/alliance received in that constituency.)
2005	Deputy	Movement for Socialism	207,785	33.17%	2nd	Lost	
2009	Deputy	Movement for Socialism	441,705	40.91%	2nd	Won	
Source: Plurinational Electoral Organ | Electoral Atlas

Chamber of Deputies of Bolivia
Preceded by Bismarck Soruco	Member of the Chamber of Deputies from Santa Cruz; 2010–2015	Succeeded by Miguel Ángel Feeney
