= Beni First =

Political party in Bolivia

Beni First (Spanish: Primero el Beni) is a regional, right-leaning political party in Beni Department. The party won the 4 April 2010 regional election, the only one it has ever contested, electing both Ernesto Suárez Sattori as governor and a plurality of 11 members of the Departmental Legislative Assembly, in which it became the largest single party. It holds the mayor's office in eight municipalities. Irregularities were confirmed at 153 voting stations across the country, Beni's voting station being one of them. Following this, a re-election was conducted with the same end results.

In 2009, prominent department politicians including Prefect (the highest executive office, now supplanted by "Governor") Ernesto Suárez and Mayor of Trinidad, Moisés Shriqui, took leadership of the party. Suárez had previously been affiliated with Social and Democratic Power (PODEMOS). Both men were re-elected in April 2010.

Governor Suárez was suspended following his indictment for irregular expenditures related to a power plant in San Borja, Beni, in compliance with a Bolivian legal mandate that indicted officials may not continue to serve. Legislators from the Movement Towards Socialism and Revolutionary Nationalist Movement backed his replacement by Haysen Ribera Leigue, over the objections of Beni First. The party fielded Carmelo Lenz, a lawyer and sub-governor of Vaca Díaz Province, as its candidate in the special gubernatorial election on 20 January 2013, in which he was elected.
