= All for Cochabamba =

All for Cochabamba (Spanish: Todos por Cochabamba) is an electoral alliance of the National Unity Front and Popular Consensus parties in the 2010 elections in Cochabamba department. Its candidate for Governor of Cochabamba was Marvell Jose Maria Leyes Justiniano.

While the alliance was narrowly defeated by the MAS-IPSP candidate in the contest for Mayor of Cochabamba, and won 5 of the 11 council seats there, it was nearly shut out in the rest of the province. Outside of the capital city, it won just two council seats: one each in Sacaba and San Benito.
