= Movement for Sovereignty =

Movement for Sovereignty Movimiento por la Soberanía
- Leader: Lino Villca
- Founded: January 1, 2010
- Split from: Movement for Socialism
- Ideology: Social democracy Democratic socialism Indigenismo; Progressivism; Plurinationalism; Anti-neoliberalism
- Political position: Centre left to left

The Movement for Sovereignty (Spanish: Movimiento por la Soberanía, MPS) is a leftist, indigenist Bolivian political party founded by dissidents of the Movement for Socialism (MAS-IPSP). Its leader, and fourth-place candidate for Governor of La Paz department in the 2010 regional election is Lino Villca. Other MAS-IPSP activists involved in founding the MPS include Óscar Chirinos, Miguel Machaca, and Rufo Calle. The party's colors are blue, white, and yellow.

In the April 2010 elections, the MPS won the mayor's office in 6 municipalities: Achacachi, Mecapaca, Escoma, Sorata, Combaya, and Pucarani.

In the 2015 regional election, prominent peasant leader (and former head of the CSUTCB) Felipe Quispe ran for governor of La Paz Department with the MPS. Indigenous intellectual and MAS-IPSP dissident Felix Patzi defected from his alliance the MPS to run with SOL.bo and win the race for governor. Overall, the party won fifteen mayor's races, but failed to win re-election in any of the municipalities it won in 2010. It elected mayors to govern Ancoraimes, Comanche, Charaña, Callapa, Mocomoco, Guanay, Guaqui, Desaguadero, Chulumani, Batallas, Colquencha, Ixiamas, Tito Yupanqui, Santiago de Machaca, and Alto Beni. With fifteen mayors, it ranked third among Bolivian political parties in the number municipalities it controls, far behind the MAS-IPSP.

In December 2015, three MPS mayors—Beatriz Arce of Guaqui, Wilfredo Acarapi of Desaguadero, and Martín Villalobos of Charaña—announced their support for President Evo Morales and received national government funds for projects in their towns.
