= 2010 Bolivian regional elections =

The 2010 Bolivian regional elections were held on 4 April 2010. Departmental and municipal authorities were elected by an electorate of approximately 5 million people. Among the officials elected are:

- Governors of all nine departments
- Members of Departamental Legislative Assemblies in each department; 23 seats in these Assemblies will represent indigenous communities, and have been selected by traditional usos y costumbres in the weeks prior to the election
- Provincial Subgovernors and Municipal Corregidors (executive authorities) in Beni
- Sectional Development Executives at the provincial level in Tarija
- Mayors and Council members in all 337 municipalities
- The five members of the Regional Assembly in the autonomous region of Gran Chaco

== Political parties participating ==
The political parties contesting elections in each department are as follows:

- Beni: Amazon Convergence (Convergencia Amazónica), Beni First (Primero El Beni), Revolutionary Nationalist Movement (Movimiento Nacionalista Revolucionario; MNR), Movement towards Socialism (Movimiento Al Socialismo - Instrumento Político por la Soberanía de los Pueblos; MAS-IPSP), and Autonomous Nationalities for Change and Empowerment (Nacionalidades Autónomas por el Cambio y Empoderamiento; NACER).
- Chuquisaca:We are all Chuquisaca (Chuquisaca somos Todos, a coalition of the National Unity Front and Popular Consensus), Renewing Freedom and Democracy (Libertad y Democracia Renovadora), Falange April 19, Without Fear Movement (Movimiento sin Miedo; MSM), and Movement towards Socialism.
- Cochabamba: All for Cochabamba (Todos por Cochabamba), Revolutionary Nationalist Movement, Without Fear Movement, and Movement towards Socialism.
- La Paz:National Unity Front (Frente de Unidad Nacional), Patriotic Social Alliance (Alianza Social Patriótica), Revolutionary Nationalist Movement, Movement towards Socialism, Without Fear Movement, and Movement for Sovereignty (Movimiento por la Soberanía).
- Oruro: National Unity Front (Frente de Unidad Nacional), Revolutionary Nationalist Movement, Movement towards Socialism, and Without Fear Movement.
- Pando: Popular Consensus (Consenso Popular), Without Fear Movement, and Movement towards Socialism.
- Potosí: Potosí Regional Civic Front (Frente Cívico Regional Potosinista), Uqarikuna Citizen Association (Agrupación Ciudadana Uqarikuna), Social Alliance (Alianza Social), Revolutionary Nationalist Movement, Movement towards Socialism.
- Santa Cruz: Broad Front of Revolutionary Nationalist Movement and Autonomy for Bolivia (Frente Amplio), All for Santa Cruz (Todos por Santa Cruz), Nationalist Citizen Force (Fuerza Ciudadana Nacionalista), Truth and Social Democracy (Verdad y Democracía Social-Verdes), Without Fear Movement, and Movement towards Socialism.
- Tarija: Path towards Change (Camino al Cambio (Alianza Departamental)), National Autonomous Power (Poder Autonómico Nacional), and Movement towards Socialism.

Including these parties, a total of 191 political forces contested municipal elections. Only the Movement towards Socialism was involved in all 337 municipal contests. Other parties participating in large numbers of contests are as follows:

Party	Number of Municipalities	Mayors elected
Movement towards Socialism	337	231
Without Fear Movement	176	21
Movement for Sovereignty	53	6
Front for Victory	50	2
Patriotic Social Alliance	38	2
VERDES, Truth and Social Democracy	33	15
National Unity Front	31	
Broad Front of MNR and Autonomy for Bolivia	31	2
All for Santa Cruz	30	
Social Alliance	22	1
Beni First	19	8
MNR-Pueblo	19	3
Popular Solidarity Alliance	16	
Originary Popular Movement	15	
Revolutionary Nationalist Movement	15	
Popular Consensus	15	8
All for Cochabamba	12	0

== Irregularities, alleged fraud, and additional voting ==
Irregularities and fraud in the voting have been alleged in at least four departments, those of the so-called media luna, Beni, Pando, Tarija, and Santa Cruz. In all four departments, the MAS-IPSP has denounced fraud and called for legal action against those responsible, some times joined by opposing political parties. Departmental Electoral Courts have invalidated votes at a number of voting tables where fraud or irregularities have been confirmed. Voters enrolled at these tables were called to cast votes again on April 18.

- In Santa Cruz, the Departmental Electoral Court annulled the results of 117 voting tables on April 11, mostly in the capital province of Andrés Ibáñez, but also in Warnes, Obispo Santistevan, Germán Busch, Cordillera, Guarayos, Ñuflo de Chávez, Vallegrande, Chiquitos, Ichilo, and other locations. 25,124 voters are entitled to a revote, about 2.7% of the department's total electorate. The president of the Court declared "We are going to repeat these acts because there was crime. The quantity of votes was altered and modified; someone interfered in the act, and that is a crime." The pro-MAS Departmental Worker's Central (Central Obrero Departamental) is calling for a revote in the entire department.
- In Beni, the MAS has alleged fraud, including at the electoral table of its candidate, Jessica Jordan.The Departmental Electoral Court has not annulled any results, and fraud accusations are being considered by the prosecutor's office.
- In La Paz, the Departmental Electoral Court found irregularities in 27 electoral tables, where the number of recorded votes exceeded the number of voters, although often by only one or two votes. These tables were annulled and will be re-voted. Officials considered both mathematical errors on the part of vote counters and fraud to be possible explanations.
- In Pando, the Departmental Electoral Court announced on April 7 that it will conduct a re-vote of 5 voting tables. Those tables are located in the municipalities of Filadelfia (1), El Sena (3), and Nueva Esperanza (1). Opposition senator Eva Gonzales, of Plan Progreso para Bolivia, has called for 18 tables to be re-voted due to electoral fraud.
- One table in Oruro will be subject to a re-vote.
- Due to a tie, there will be a runoff for the departmental assembly member from Villamontes in the Chaco region.
- In the municipality of Pailón, an initial tie between Armando Mamani (of MAS) and Luis Alberto Ruiz (of Todos por Santa Cruz) was broken on 19 April, by the reinstatement of 5 votes for Ruiz by the National Electoral Court. This brought the margin to 1,284-1,279 in Ruiz's favor. The MAS candidate has announced plans to press to change the outcome through a judicial complaint as well as a road blockade.

== Results ==
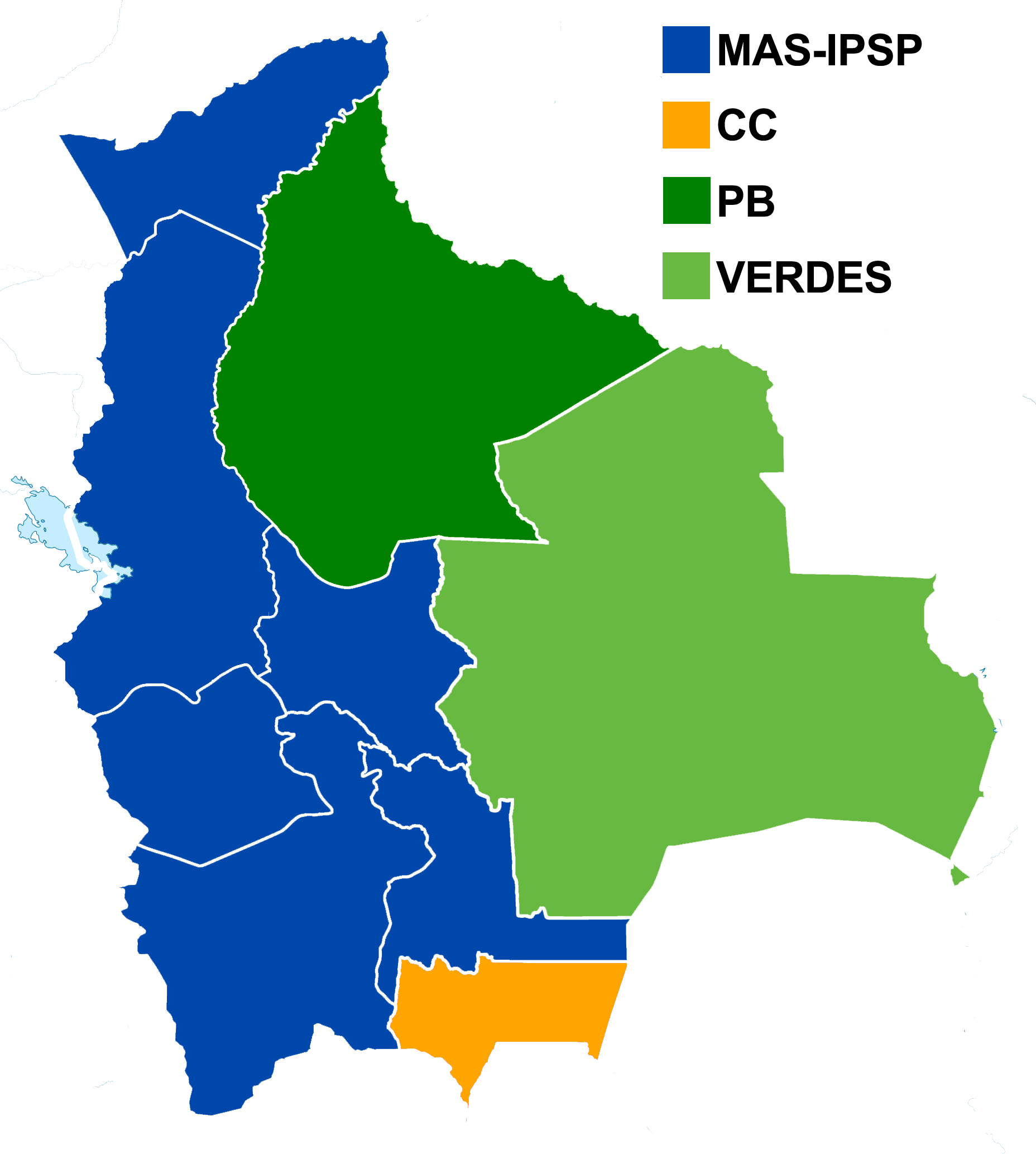
Results of the governors elections.

=== Departmental results ===
As of 12 Abril, with counting nearly complete, all Governor's contests were effectively decided. The MAS-IPSP won 6 governorships, in Chuquisaca, Cochabamba, La Paz, Oruro, Pando, and Potosí. Victors in other races were: Beni First's Ernesto Suárez, Rubén Costas of the Greens in Santa Cruz, and Mario Cossío of the Path towards Change in Tarija.

Complete vote totals are as follows:

==== Beni ====
Beni departmental election, 2010
Gubernatorial Candidate	Party	Votes for Governor	Percentage	Assembly Members 24 elected by territory
Ernesto Suárez	Beni First	64.055	42,5%	11
Jessica Jordan	Movement for Socialism	60.477	40,1%	10
	Nationalist Revolutionary Movement-Pueblo	18.269	12,1%	3
	Amazon Convergence	5.949	3,9%	0
	Autonomous Nationalities for Change and Empowerment	1.894	1,3%	0
Indigenous Representatives		Elected through usos y costumbres		2
Peasant Representatives		Elected through usos y costumbres		2
	Valid votes	150.644	91,6%	
	Blank votes	8.739	5,3	
	Null votes	5.009	3,0%	
	Total votes	164.392	86,8% of registered voters	28
Source: Corte Nacional Electoral, Acto de Computo Nacional Archived 2011-07-16 at the Wayback Machine

The indigenous representatives were elected separately in an Assembly of the Indigenous People of Beni held in the Pastoral Center of the Apostolic Vicarate of Beni on 22 March 2010. Lola Tabo (of the Cavineño people, nominated by the Central Indígena de la Región Amazónica de Bolivia, CIRABO) and William Cuellar (Sirionó, nominated by the Central de Pueblos Indígenas del Beni, CPIB) were elected as departmental assembly members. Inocencio Yubanure (Mojeño-Ignaciano, nominated by the Central de Pueblos Étnicos Mojeños del Beni, CPEMB) and Dolores Muiba Noza (Mojeño-Trinitario, nominated by the Central de Mujeres Indígenas Beni, CMIB) were the chosen alternates.

==== Chuquisaca ====
Chuquisaca departmental election, 2010
Gubernatorial Candidate	Party	Votes for Governor	Percentage	Assembly Members by Territory	Votes for Assembly by Population	Percentage	Assembly Members by Population	Total Assembly Members
Esteban Urquizu	Movement for Socialism	109.270	53,6%	9	90.921	53,3%	6	15
Jhon Cava	We Are All Chuquisaca	72.314	35,5%	1	53.801	31,5%	3	4
	Renewing Freedom and Democracy (LIDER)	8.752	4,3%	0	10.012	5,9%	0	0
Bernabé Paredes	Without Fear Movement	8.044	3,9%	0	9.799	5,7%	0	0
Horacio Poppe	Falange F-19	5.476	2,7%	0	6.127	3,6%	0	0
Indigenous Representatives		Elected through usos y costumbres by the Guaraní people						2
	Valid votes	203.856	86,3%		170.660	72,4%		
	Blank votes	19.966	8,5%		55.051	23,4%		
	Null votes	12.439	5,3%		9.849	4,2%		
	Total votes	236.261	86,7% of registered voters	10	235.560	86,4% of registered voters	9	21
Source: Corte Nacional Electoral, Acto de Computo Nacional Archived 2011-07-16 at the Wayback Machine

==== Cochabamba ====
Cochabamba departmental election, 2010
Gubernatorial Candidate	Party	Votes for Governor	Percentage	Assembly Members by Territory	Votes for Assembly by Population	Percentage	Assembly Members by Population	Total Assembly Members
Edmundo Novillo Aguilar	Movement for Socialism	415.245	61,9%	16	360.785	60,7%	11	27
Marvell José María Leyes Justiniano	National Unity Front-Popular Consensus (All for Cochabamba)	174.175	26,0%	0	147.442	24,8%	4	4
José Ronald Del Barco Alcocer	Without Fear Movement	52.516	7,8%	0	63.614	10,7%	1	1
María Casta Jaimes Arriaran	Nationalist Revolutionary Movement	29.250	4,4	0	22.800	3,8%	0	0
Indigenous Representatives		Elected through usos y costumbres by the Yuqui and Yuracaré peoples						2
	Valid votes	671.186	81,9%		594.641	72,7%		
	Blank votes	111.510	13,6		183.077	22,4%		
	Null votes	36.905	4,5%		40.713	5,0%		
	Total votes	819.601	87,2% of registered voters	16	818.431	87,1% of registered voters	16	34
Source: Corte Nacional Electoral, Acto de Computo Nacional Archived 2011-07-16 at the Wayback Machine

==== La Paz ====
Gubernatorial Candidate	Party	Votes for Governor	Percentage	Assembly Members by Territory	Votes for Assembly by Population	Percentage	Assembly Members by Population	Total Assembly Members
César Cocarico	Movement for Socialism	534.563	50,0%	19	407.949	46,9%	11	30
Simón Yampara	Without Fear Movement		23,2	1	251.400	28,9%	6	7
Carlos Hugo Laruta	National Unity Front	159.499	14,9%	0	107.026	12,3%	2	2
Lino Villca	Movement for Sovereignty	67.863	6,3%	0	49.862	5,7%	1	1
Julio Tito Condori	Patriotic Social Alliance	30.361	2,8%	0	28.542	3,3%	0	0
Einar Calderón	Nationalist Revolutionary Movement	29.152	2,7	0	24.620	2,8%	0	0
Indigenous Representatives		Elected through usos y costumbres						5
	Valid votes	1.069.234	79,8%		869.399	65,0%		
	Blank votes	190.967	14,3		403.715	30,2%		
	Null votes	79.475	5,9%		64.527	4,8%		
	Total votes	1.339.676	89,1% of registered voters	20	1.337.641	88,9% of registered voters	20	45
Source: Corte Nacional Electoral, Acto de Computo Nacional, Boletín 22: Explicación asignación de escaños departamentales

==== Oruro ====
Gubernatorial Candidate	Party	Votes for Governor	Percentage	Assembly Members by Territory	Votes for Assembly by Population	Percentage	Assembly Members by Population	Total Assembly Members
Santos Tito	Movement for Socialism	107.576	59,6%	15	83.220	56,1%	10	25
Iver Pereira Vásquez	Without Fear Movement	53.111	29,4	1	47.319	31,9%	5	6
	National Unity Front	13.933	7,7%	0	12.277	8,3%	1	1
Guillermo Zolá Eugenio	Nationalist Revolutionary Movement	5.800	3,2%	0	5.612	3,8%	0	0
Indigenous Representatives		Elected through usos y costumbres						1
	Valid votes	180.420	81,5%		148.428	67,1%		
	Blank votes	28.055	12,7		62.222	30,2%		
	Null votes	12.939	5,8%		10.706	4,8%		
	Total votes	221.414	87,5% of registered voters	16	221.356	87,4% of registered voters	16	33
Source: Corte Nacional Electoral, Acto de Computo Nacional, Boletín 22: Explicación asignación de escaños departamentales

==== Pando ====
Potosí departmental election, 2010
Gubernatorial Candidate	Party	Votes for Governor	Percentage	Assembly Members by Territory	Total Assembly Members
Luis Adolfo Flores	Movement for Socialism	17.192	49,7%	7	7
Paulo Jorge Bravo	Popular Consensus	16.744	48,4%	8	8
Egidio Tuesta	Without Fear Movement	657	1,9%	did not contest	
Indigenous Representatives		Elected through usos y costumbres			1
	Valid votes	34.593	93,4%		
	Blank votes	1.292	3,5%		
	Null votes	1.168	3,2%		
	Total votes	37.053	85,5% of registered voters	15	16
Source: Corte Nacional Electoral, Acto de Computo Nacional Archived 2011-07-16 at the Wayback Machine

==== Potosí ====
Potosí departmental election, 2010
Gubernatorial Candidate	Party	Votes for Governor	Percentage	Assembly Members by Territory	Votes for Assembly by Population	Percentage	Assembly Members by Population	Total Assembly Members
Félix Gonzáles	Movement for Socialism	163.989	66,8%	16	123.663	63,1%	11	27
Richard Alejo	Social Alliance	31.564	12,9%	0	39.152	20,0%	3	4
Orlando Careaga	Uqarikuna Citizen Association	27.873	11,4%	0	13.569	6,9%	1	1
Miguel Ángel Pineda	Potosí Regional Civic Front	15.960	6,5%	0	14.275	7,3%	1	1
Guillermo Condori Ramos	Revolutionary Nationalist Movement	6.066	2,5%	0	5.171	2,6%	0	0
	Valid votes	245.452	80,4%		195.830	64,2%		
	Blank votes	37.311	12,2%		96.033	31,5%		
	Null votes	22.599	7,4%		13.226	4,3%		
	Total votes	305.362	83,2% of registered voters	16	305.089	83,1% of registered voters	16	32
Source: Corte Nacional Electoral, Acto de Computo Nacional Archived 2011-07-16 at the Wayback Machine

==== Santa Cruz ====
Santa Cruz departmental election, 2010
Gubernatorial Candidate	Party	Votes for Governor	Percentage	Assembly Members by Territory	Votes for Assembly by Population	Percentage	Assembly Members by Population	Total Assembly Members
Rubén Armando Costas Aguilera	Truth and Social Democracy (Verdes)	515.370	52,6%	7	411.019	50,6%	5	12
Jerjes Justiniano Talavera	Movement for Socialism	374.326	38,2%	6	294.948	36,3%	3	9
Juan Carlos Urenda	All for Santa Cruz	43.929	4,5%	0	46.591	5,7%	0	0
Willams Paniagua Yépez	Broad Front of Revolutionary Nationalist Movement and Autonomy for Bolivia	25.031	2,6%	2	34.709	4,3%	0	2
José Carlos Gutiérrez Vargas	Without Fear Movement	11.530	1,2%	0	17.016	2,1%	0	0
Érika Oroza Werner	Nationalist Citizen Force	8.937	0,9%	0	8.660	1,1%	0	0
Indigenous Representatives		Elected through usos y costumbres						5
	Valid votes	979.123	93,0%		812.943	78,3%		
	Blank votes	39.955	3,8%		203.015	19,5%		
	Null votes	33.348	3,2%		22.929	2,2%		
	Total votes	1.052.426	85,9% of registered voters	15	1.038.887	84,7% of registered voters	8	28
All party percentages are the percent of valid votes. Percentages of valid, blank, and null votes are the percent of total votes emitted. Source: Corte Nacional Electoral, Acto de Computo Nacional Archived 2011-07-16 at the Wayback Machine

==== Tarija ====
Tarija departmental election, 2010
Gubernatorial Candidate	Party	Votes for Governor	Percentage	Assembly Members by Territory	Assembly Members by Population	Total Assembly Members
Mario Adel Cossio Cortez	Path to Change (MNR - CDC - FRI alliance)	97.726	48,9%	5	6	11
Carlos Cabrera	Movement for Socialism	88.014	44,1%	5	6	11
Edwin Flores	National Power of Autonomy	13.909	7,0%	2	3	5
Indigenous Representatives		Elected through usos y costumbres by the Guaraní, Weenhayek, and Tapiete peoples				3
	Valid votes	199.649	88,7%			
	Blank votes	16.827	7,5%			
	Null votes	8.574	3,8%			
	Total votes	225.050	85,0% of registered voters	12	15	30
All party percentages are the percent of valid votes. Percentages of valid, blank, and null votes are the percent of total votes emitted. Source: Corte Nacional Electoral, Acto de Computo Nacional Archived 2011-07-16 at the Wayback Machine

=== Mayors results ===
As of 12 April, MAS-IPSP had won the Mayor's race in 229 of the country's 337 municipalities. However, among major cities (the departmental capitals plus El Alto) it won just three, Cochabamba, Cobija (Pando Department), and El Alto. Without Fear Movement candidates will be Mayors of La Paz (Luis Revilla) and Oruro. Regional candidates won in the following major cities: Jaime Barrón (PAÍS) in Sucre, Óscar Montes (Unidos para Renovar) in Tarija, Percy Fernández in Santa Cruz, Moisés Shriqui (Beni First) in Trinidad, and René Joaquino (Social Alliance) in Potosí.

Other municipal results are as follows:

- In Beni department, Beni First won 8 of the 19 mayor's races, including the capital, Trinidad. The MAS-IPSP also won the race for mayor in 8 municipalities. The MNR-Pueblo alliance won the remaining three races.
- In Chuquisaca department, MAS-IPSP won 23 of the 29 mayor's races. The Without Fear Movement won in 3 municipalities: Culpina, Las Carreras, and Huacaya. Jaime Barrón of the Pact of Social Integration (PAÍS) won the capital, Sucre, defeating MAS candidate Ana María Quinteros. LIDER won in Huacareta and NA-C in Monteagudo.
- In Cochabamba department, the MAS-IPSP won mayor's races in 40 of the 47 municipalities, and a council majority in 39. Its candidate, Edwin Castellanos became the Mayor of Cercado Municipality (Cochabamba, the city) by defeating Arturo Murillo (All for Cochabamba, TPC). In the capital, MAS-IPSP and All for Cochabamba each hold 5 of the 11 council seats, with the last belonging to Front for Victory. The Without Fear Movement won the mayor's office in 3 municipalities, Colomi, Kuchumuela and Tolata, and has council members in 23 municipalities. MAS-IPSP holds the council majority in Colomi. Unity New Hope (Spanish: Unidad Nueva Esperanza) won the mayor's office in Quillacollo, as well as 5 seats on the council, joined by 5 MAS-IPSP council members, and one from Front for Victory. The Indígena Martín Uchu movement won the mayor's race and five of seven council seats in Punata. The ARI grouping won the mayor's seat and two of five council seats in San Benito (2 belong to MAS-IPSP; 1 to All for Cochabamba). The PUN grouping won both the mayor's race and a 3 of 5 council majority in Pasorapa. Pasorapa mayor elect Cintia Guisela Ávila and Toco mayor elect Janeth Flores Ferrufino are the only two women to head municipal governments. In accordance with the law of alternation among candidates, there are 272 women and 275 men among the council members.
- In La Paz department, the MAS-IPSP won the race for mayor in 58 municipalities: Achocalla, Ancoraimes, Santiago de Huata, Caquiaviri, Comanche, Charaña, Waldo Ballivián, Nazacara de Pacajes, Santiago de Callapa, Puerto Acosta, Mocomoco, Chuma, Aucapata, Guanay, Tacacoma, Tipuani, Teoponte, Pelechuco, Viacha, Guaqui, Tiwanaku, Desaguadero, Jesús de Machaca, Luribay, Yaco, Cairoma, Quime, Colquiri, Choca, Licoma Pampa, Irupana, Yanacachi, Palos Blancos, Laja, Batallas, Sica Sica, Ayo Ayo, Calamarca, Patacamaya, Colquencha, Collana, Coroico, Coripata, Ixiamas, San Buenaventura, Charazani, Curva, Copacabana, San Pedro de Tiquina, San Pedro de Curahuara Papel Pampa, Chacarilla, Santiago de Machaca, Catacora, Caranavi, Alto Beni and El Alto. The victory in El Alto was accomplished by Édgar Patana over Abel Mamani (MSM). The Without Fear Movement won in 7 municipalities: La Paz, Humanata, Quiabaya, Mapiri, Apolo, Malla and Tito Yupanqui. Luis "Lucho' Revilla was its successful candidate in the capital, defeating the MAS-IPSP's Elizabeth Salguero. The Movement for Sovereignty won in 6 municipalities: Achacachi, Mecapaca, Escoma, Sorata, Combaya, and Pucarani. The Patriotic Social Alliance won in the two municipalities of Ayata and Puerto Pérez. The Departmental Association of Coca Growers won in the two municipalities of Chulumani y Cajuata. The Front for Victory won in the two municipalities of Inquisivi y Sapahaqui. Other organizations won one municipality each: TP-A in La Asunta, Cumi in Calacoto, TS in Puerto Carabuco, CAOSAM in San Andrés de Machaca, and CAOTM in Taraco. Just 21 women contested for mayor in the 85 municipalities, and only five were elected.
- In Oruro department, MAS-IPSP won the mayor's office in 31 of the 35 municipalities. The Without Fear Movement won three, including the capital, Oruro.
- In Pando department, Popular Consensus won 8 of the 15 mayor's races. MAS-IPSP won the remaining seven, including the capital, Cobija. Ana Lucía Reis, an environmentalist and former Congressional Deputy affiliated with the MNR, is the new mayor of Cobija.
- In Potosí department, MAS-IPSP won the mayor's office in 34 of the 40 municipalities. The Without Fear Movement won three. Social Alliance won the capital, Potosí.
- In Santa Cruz department, MAS-IPSP won the mayor's office in 25 of the 56 municipalities. Truth and Social Democracy (VERDES) won 15 mayor's races. The Broad Front (MNR-APB) won three. Two mayor's races were won by the Chiquitana Indigenous Organization (Organización Indígena Chiquitana; OICH). The Without Fear Movement and several local political forces–SOL, NEGRO, VOCES, LIDER, SAN, CHINO, MATICO, MANOS, and GH–each won one.
- In Tarija department, MAS-IPSP won 5 of the 11 mayor's races: : Caraparí, El Puente, San Lorenzo, Yunchará, and Padcaya. Six other political forces each won one: UNIR in the capital, Path Towards Change in Concepción, MAR in Bermejo, PAN in Yacuiba, RHP in Villa Montes, and ARO in Entre Ríos.
