= Juan Pablo Velasco =

Bolivian politician and businessman (born 1987)

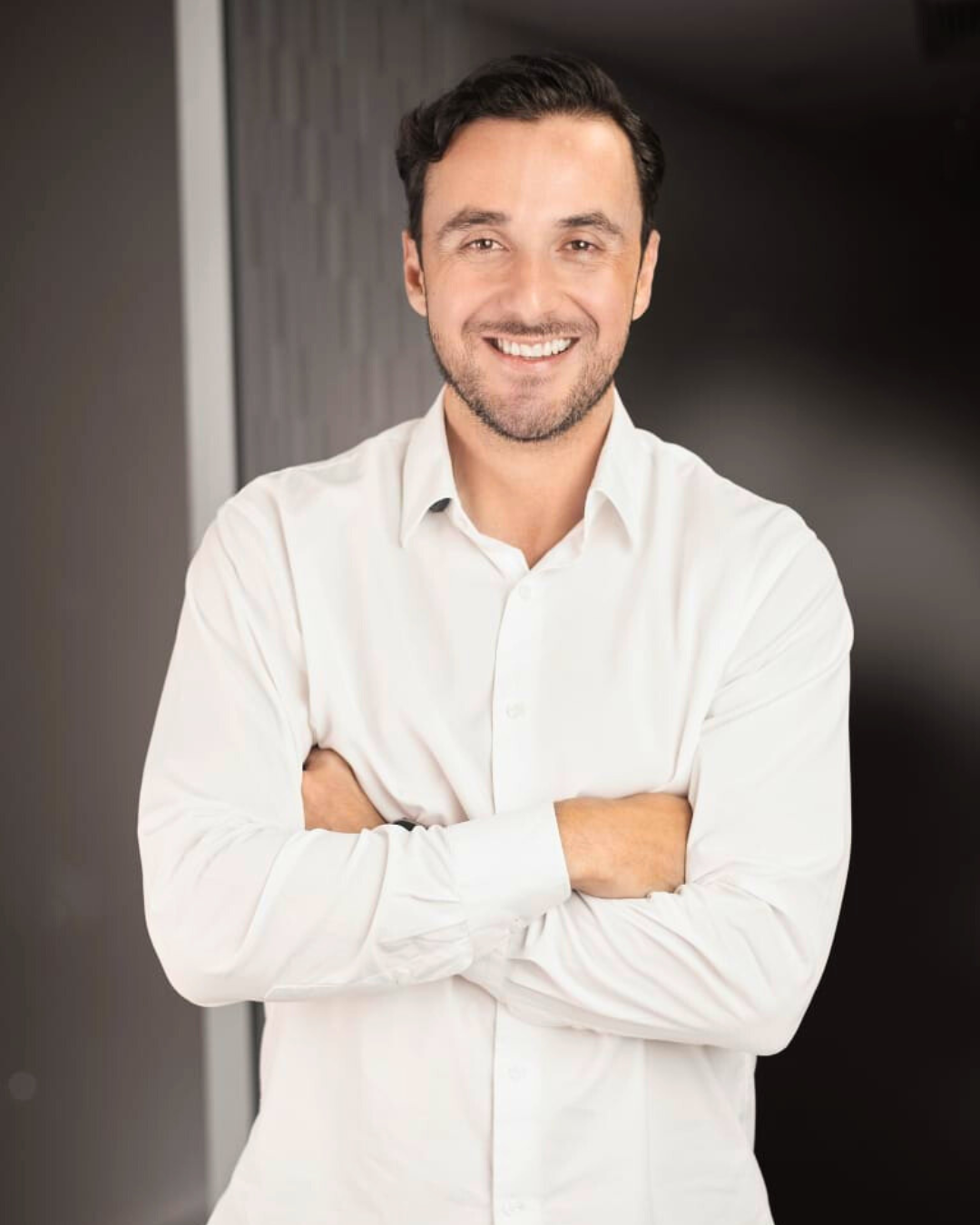
- Velasco in 2026

3nd Governor of Santa Cruz
- Incumbent
- Assumed office 3 May 2026
- Vice Governor: Paola Aguirre
- Preceded by: Luis Fernando Camacho

Personal details
- Born: 9 April 1987 (age 39) Santa Cruz de la Sierra, Bolivia
- Party: Libre

Juan Pablo Velasco (born 9 April 1987) is a Bolivian businessman and politician who is the governor of Santa Cruz following the 2026 Bolivian regional elections. He also was a candidate for the vice-presidency of Bolivia in the 2025 general election, as the running mate of Jorge Quiroga of the Libre alliance.

== Biography ==
Velasco is a businessman from Santa Cruz de la Sierra. He is an entrepreneur in the tech industry. Velasco is the co-founder of a food delivery company that was later acquired by the chain PedidosYa and is currently the general manager of Yango Bolivia. He was the running mate of Jorge Quiroga of the Libre alliance in the 2025 general election.
