= Agency for the Development of Macroregions and Border Zones =

Bolivian government agency

The Agency for the Development of Macroregions and Border Zones (Spanish: Agencia para el Desarrollo de las Macrorregiones y Zonas Fronterizas; ADEMAF) is a Bolivian government agency that is part of the Ministry for Development Planning. It oversees government operations in four border "macroregions": the Amazonian, Andean, Chaco, and Chuquitania macroregions. Its 2012 annual budget was 20 million Bolivianos.

ADEMAF is headed by an Executive General Director, currently Jerges Mercado Suarez. Its first director was Juan Ramón Quintana.

ADEMAF was created by President Evo Morales through Supreme Decree 0538 on 3 June 2010. The Frontier Development and Security Law (Law 100), promulgated in April 2011, gives ADEMAF additional responsibilities related to economic planning, prevention of contraband trade, and assuring the presence of the state in border areas.
