= Rubén Costas =

1st Governor of Santa Cruz Department

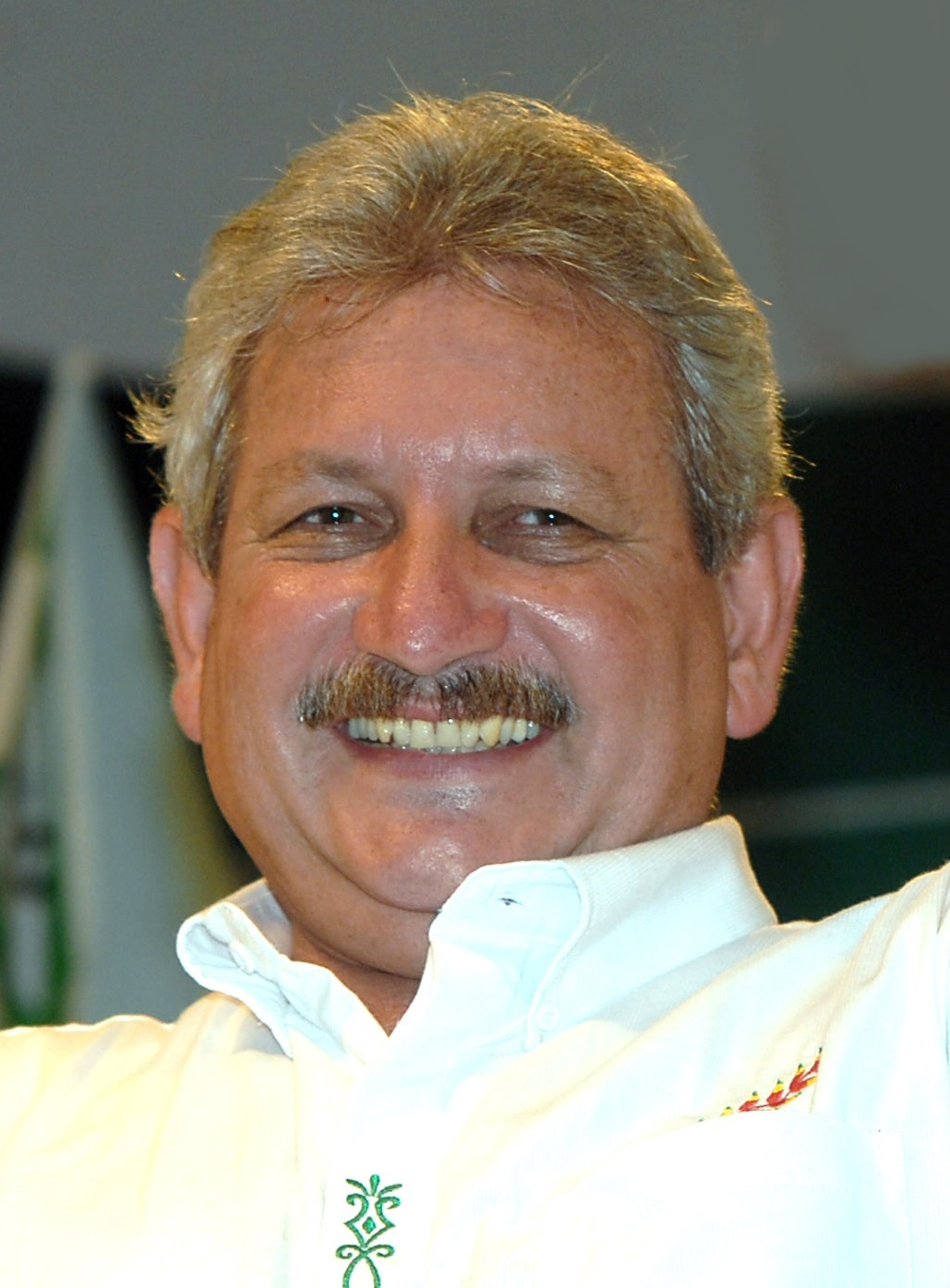

1st Governor of Santa Cruz
- In office 31 May 2015 – 3 May 2021
- Preceded by: Ruth Lozada (interim)
- Succeeded by: Luis Fernando Camacho
- In office 30 May 2010 – 11 December 2014
- Preceded by: Office established (Roly Aguilera as interim prefect)
- Succeeded by: Ruth Lozada (interim)

Prefect of Santa Cruz
- In office 22 January 2006 – 5 January 2010
- Preceded by: Rubén Darío Cuéllar
- Succeeded by: Roly Aguilera (interim)

Personal details
- Born: Rubén Armando Costas Aguilera; 6 October 1955 (age 71) Santa Cruz de la Sierra, Bolivia
- Party: Democrat Social Movement (2013–present)
- Other political affiliations: Autonomy for Bolivia (2005–2006); Truth and Social Democracy (2006–2013)
- Spouse: Sonia Vincenti Égüez
- Parent(s): Rubén Costas Menacho; Guedy Aguilera de Costas

Rubén Armando Costas Aguilera (born 6 October 1955) is a Bolivian politician and the prefect and then governor of Santa Cruz Department in Bolivia from 2006 to 2021, and also the leader of the Democrat Social Movement (MDS).

== Early life and career ==
Rubén Costas was born on 6 October 1955 in Santa Cruz de la Sierra to Rubén Costas Menacho and Guedy Aguilera de Costas. He is married to Sonia Vincentti Égüez. Originally an agricultural technician by profession, he later became leader of the Bolivian Cattlemen's Confederation, the Milk Producers Association, the Eastern Agricultural Chamber. From 2003 to 2004, he was the leader of the Santa Cruz Civic Committee.

== Prefect and Governor of Santa Cruz (2006–present) ==
Costas successfully ran in the 2005 general elections for the office of Prefect of Santa Cruz on behalf of the Autonomy for Bolivia party. This election was the result of several negotiations and large, peaceful public demonstrations in Santa Cruz demanding that prefects, the highest office in each of the nine departments, be elected by popular vote. Prior to that, the provisions of the 1967 Constitution stated that prefects were to be appointed by the president. Due to popular demand and negotiations led by Costas, the Bolivian National Congress approved Law 3015 to formalize the prefect election process. This was a major victory for the autonomy movement, born out of the eastern region of Bolivia, that fought for decentralization of political power.

=== Prefect of Santa Cruz (2006–2010) ===
Following the 2005 elections, Costas became the first democratically elected Prefect of Santa Cruz, being inaugurated on 22 January 2006. In 2008, he participated, along with all other departmental governors, in that year's no confidence referendum, with 66% of voters electing to keep him in office. Costas remained in office until 5 January 2010 when, following the promulgation of 2009 Constitution, he resigned to run for governor (the same office, renamed under the new constitution) in that year's regional elections.

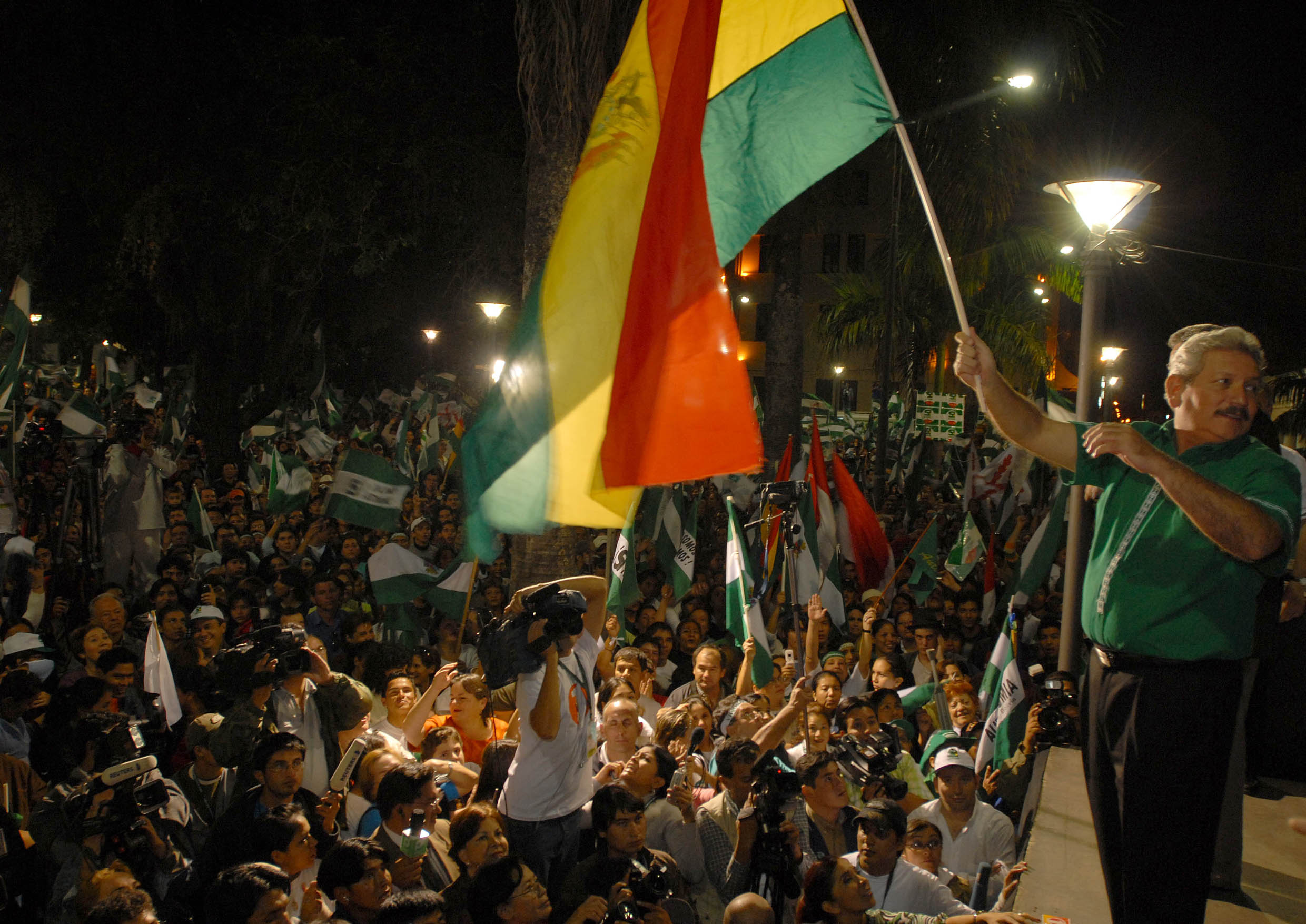
Costas at a rally in Santa Cruz

=== Governor of Santa Cruz (2010–2021) ===
Costas ran as a member of the Truth and Social Democracy (VERDES) party, of which he was the leader, winning 54% of the popular vote and returning to the leadership of Santa Cruz on 30 May 2010. Since he took office, Costas remained strongly critical of the government of President Evo Morales because of Morales's opposition to decentralization.

On 12 April 2011, Costas was shot in the left temporal bone in the Blacutt Square of Santa Cruz de la Sierra after attempted to prevent the assault of a woman by two assailants on motorcycles. The injury was non-lethal and he was discharged a few weeks after the incident.

Ahead of the 2014 general elections, Costas merged his VERDES party with Renewing Freedom and Democracy (LIDER), and Popular Consensus (CP), forming the Democrat Social Movement (MDS). At the party's first National Congress on 15 December 2013, Costas was chosen as its presidential candidate. However, the party withdrew from the elections, opting instead to ally with Samuel Doria Medina's National Unity Front. Instead, Costas successfully ran for a second term in the 2015 regional elections. On 11 December 2014, Costas resigned in favor of Assemblywoman Ruth Lozada in order to qualify as a gubernatorial candidate. Upon winning, he was inaugurated again on 31 May 2015.

After more than 14 years in power in Santa Cruz, Costas announced that he would not run for reelection nor run for the office of Mayor of Santa Cruz de la Sierra in the following year's regional elections. The MDS did not present its own gubernatorial candidate to succeed Costas, instead choosing to endorse Creemos leader Luis Fernando Camacho, who ultimately won in the first round.

Civic offices
Preceded by Lorgio Paz Stelzer	President of the Santa Cruz Civic Committee; 2003–2005	Succeeded by Germán Antelo Vaca
Political offices
Preceded by Rubén Darío Cuéllar	Prefect of Santa Cruz; 2006–2010	Succeeded by Roly Aguilera; Interim
Preceded by Roly Aguilera as interim prefect	Governor of Santa Cruz; 2010–2014	Succeeded by Ruth Lozada; Interim
Preceded by Ruth Lozada; Interim	Governor of Santa Cruz; 2015–2021	Succeeded by Luis Fernando Camacho
Party political offices
New political party	Leader of the Democrat Social Movement; 2013–present	Incumbent
