= Lino Villca =

Bolivian politician

Lino Villca Delgado is a Bolivian politician, a leader of the coca growers movement in the Yungas, a co-founder of the Movement for Socialism (MAS) who turned party dissident. His movement career began with a leadership role in the coca growers association of La Asunta, followed by work in the Departmental Association of Coca Growers, ADEPCOCA. He served as Senator from La Paz, affiliated with the MAS, from 2006 to 2010.

After breaking with the MAS, he founded the Movement for Sovereignty party, and was its candidate for Governor of La Paz department in the 2010 regional election.
