= Verdes (Bolivia) =

Political party in Bolivia

VERDES (short for Verdad y Democracia Social, 'Truth and Social Democracy'; the acronym means Greens) was a liberal-conservative political party in the Department of Santa Cruz, Bolivia founded in 2009 and was led by Rubén Costas. In the 2010 departmental elections, Costas won the governorship of Santa Cruz, which he had previously governed as prefect.

Verdes held its first congress in June 2011.

The party was dissolved in August 2013, and its members joined the ranks of the Democrat Social Movement.
