= Popular Consensus =

Popular Consensus Consenso Popular
- Leader: Óscar Ortiz Antelo
- Founded: 2009
- Dissolved: 2013
- Succeeded by: Social Democratic Movement
- Headquarters: Santa Cruz de la Sierra
- Ideology: Liberal conservatism
- Political position: Centre-right
- Regional affiliation: Union of Latin American Parties
- International affiliation: International Democrat Union
- Regional affiliation: Union of Latin American Parties
- Colors: Orange and green

Website
- http://www.consensopopular.org.bo/

Popular Consensus (Spanish: Consenso Popular, CP) was a Bolivian political party founded in 2009. CP founder Óscar Ortiz Antelo was President of the Senate of Bolivia from 2008 to 2010. In the 2009 national election, the party formed an electoral alliance with the National Unity Front, the Consensus Alliance for National Unity, behind the candidacy of Samuel Doria Medina for president. During the 2010 regional election it was involved with the All for Cochabamba and We are all Chuquisaca alliances, and supported the candidacy of Rubén Costas for governor of Santa Cruz. In Pando, the party narrowly lost to the Movement towards Socialism in state elections, and thus formed the principal opposition. CP was replaced by the Social Democrat Movement ("Demócratas") in August 2013.
