= Usos y costumbres =

Indigenous customary law in Hispanic America

Usos y costumbres ("customs and traditions"; literally, "uses and customs") is the indigenous customary law in Hispanic America. Since the era of Spanish colonialism, authorities have recognized local forms of rulership, self governance, and juridical practice, with varying degrees of acceptance and formality. The term is often used in English without translation.

Usos y costumbres political mechanisms are used by numerous indigenous peoples in Mexico, Guatemala, Bolivia, and other countries to govern water rights, in criminal and civil conflicts, and to elect their representatives to regional and national bodies.

== Under Spanish colonial rule ==
Spanish colonial authorities in the Americas were ordered to investigate the traditions and customs of indigenous communities, and to apply these traditions to disputes among Indian subjects. Scholar José Rabasa traces the term usos y costumbres to the New Laws of 1542, which ordered traditional procedures be used in dealings with Indians rather than "ordinary" Spanish legal proceedings. The division of legal authority is associated with notion of a Republic of Indians (Spanish: República de Indios) subject to distinct legal norms under Spanish colonial rule. According to Rabasa, this division "at once protects Indian communities from Spaniards, criollos, and mestizos, and alienates Indians in a separate republic, in a structure not unlike apartheid."

== North America ==
=== Mexico ===
In Mexico, usos y costumbres practices are widely used by indigenous communities and are officially recognized in the states of Oaxaca (for 417 of 570 municipalities), Sonora, and Chiapas.

== Central America ==
=== Guatemala ===
In Guatemala, Maya communities have used a variety of community-oriented or informal mechanisms for conflict resolution. They are commonly referred to as Maya justice, or usos y costumbres.

== South America ==
=== Bolivia ===
In Bolivia, indigenous norms for self-governance, justice, and administration of territory are extensively recognized by the 2009 Constitution, which defines the country as plurinational. This recognition builds on earlier incorporation of indigenous customary law into the Bolivian legal system. In eight of the country's nine departments, minority indigenous peoples (and in La Paz, Afro-Bolivians) elect representatives to the Departmental Assembly through customary procedures.

Native Community Lands (Spanish: Tierras Comunitarias de Origen; TCOs), as recognized by the 1994 Constitutional reform, are indigenous territories whose governance is determined by usos y costumbres. As of 2011, TCOs are being included under the Indigenous-Origin Campesino Autonomy regime. The eleven municipalities also under this regime may choose to use usos y costumbres for their internal governance. Indigenous water rights, governed by usos y costumbres, were recognized by amendments to Bolivia's Law 2029 following the 2000 Cochabamba Water War.

=== Colombia ===
In Colombia, the 1991 Constitution recognizes locally elected cabildos, chosen by usos y costumbres, as the governing authorities of indigenous reserves (resguardos) and the validity of customary law in these territories.

== See also ==
- Custom (law)
