= Amparo (name) =

Amparo is a Portuguese and Spanish word that means refuge or shelter (and in a broader sense, protection). Several places in the Iberian Peninsula and in Latin America are named Amparo, some associated with Our Lady of the Refuge (Port.: Nossa Senhora do Amparo, Esp: Nuestra Señora del Amparo). It is sometimes spelled Ámparo (in Spanish).

== Origin ==
On 24 February 1409, the Venerable Joan Gilabert Jofré of the Military Order of Our Lady of Mercy was en route to Valencia's Cathedral to deliver a Lenten sermon when he witnessed a mentally ill man being lynched. In response, his Order founded a hospice in 1410 with help from Roman Catholic confreres for the mentally ill under the invocation of Sancta dels Folls Doña Nostra i Desamparats Innocents (Our Lady of the insane and the innocent; sometimes translated as Our Lady of the forsaken), whose goal was to help people with mental illness. It has been claimed that this was the first psychiatric hospital in the world.

Due to the famine of the period and the high rate of orphans due to the plague, the streets were filled with orphans. The hospice was soon expanded to assist orphans and foundlings, many the result of the plague.

== People with the name ==
=== Given name ===
- Amparo Acker-Palmer (born 1968), Spanish biologist
- Amparo Alvajar (1916–1998), Spanish journalist, dramatist, and writer
- Amparo Arozamena (1916–2009), Mexican actress
- Amparo Arrebato (1944–2004), Colombian dancer
- Amparo Ballivián (born 1960), Bolivian economist
- Amparo Baró (1937–2015), Spanish actress
- Amparo Cabanes Pecourt (born 1938), Spanish academic and politician
- Amparo Caicedo (born 1965), Colombian sprinter
- Amparo Cuevas (1931–2012), Spanish Roman Catholic seer
- Amparo Custodio (1918–1993), Filipino comedian and actress
- Amparo Dávila (1928–2020), Mexican writer
- Amparo Garcia-Crow, Mexican-American filmmaker
- Amparo Grisales (born 1956), Colombian actress
- Amparo Guillén (1953–2024), Ecuadorian actress
- Amparo Illana (1934–2001), wife of Spanish politician Adolfo Suárez
- Amparo Iturbi (1898–1969), Spanish concert pianist
- Amparo Lim (born 1969), Filipino badminton player
- Amparo Llanos (born 1965), Spanish musician
- Amparo Menendez-Carrion (born 1949), Uruguayan-Ecuadorian academic
- Amparo Montes (1920–2002), Mexican singer
- Amparo Moraleda Martínez (born 1964), Spanish business executive
- Amparo Muñoz (1954–2011), Spanish actress
- Amparo Noguera born 1965), Chilean television and film actress
- Amparo Ochoa (1946–1994), Mexican singer-songwriter
- Ámparo Otero Pappo (1896–1987), Cuban milliner honored as Righteous Among the Nations
- Amparo Pacheco (1924–2017), Spanish actress
- Amparo Piñero (born 1997), Spanish actress, singer, dancer and model
- Amparo Poch y Gascón (1902–1968), Spanish anarchist
- Amparo Rivelles (1925–2013), Spanish actress
- Amparo Rubiales (born 1945), Spanish politician
- Amparo Rubín (1955–2024), Mexican singer
- Amparo Sánchez, Spanish musician
- Amparo Soler Leal (1933–2013), Spanish actress
- Amparo Valle (1939–2016), Spanish actress
- Amparo de Zeledón (1870–1951), Costa Rican botanist and philanthropist

=== Surname ===
- Ely do Amparo (1921–1991), Brazilian footballer
- Kristin Amparo (born 1983), Swedish singer
