= Amparo =

Amparo, a Portuguese and Spanish word meaning refuge, shelter, or protection, may refer to:

== People ==
- Amparo (name)
- Amparo people, Afro-Cuban descendants of Angola

== Places ==
=== Brazil ===
- Amparo, São Paulo
- Amparo, Paraíba
- Amparo do Serra, Minas Gerais
- Amparo de São Francisco, Sergipe
- Santo Antônio do Amparo, Minas Gerais

=== Other places ===
- Amparo Museum, Puebla, Mexico
- Amparo High School, Caloocan, Philippines

== Other uses ==
- Amparo (film), a 2022 Colombian drama film
- Massacre of El Amparo, the killing of 14 fishermen in El Amparo, Venezuela in 1988
- Megachile amparo, a bee of family Megachilidae
- Recurso de amparo or writ of amparo, a form of constitutional relief found in the legal systems of some countries
- Roman Catholic Diocese of Amparo, in Amparo, São Paulo
