= Ballivián =

Ballivián may refer to:

== People ==
- Amparo Ballivián (born 1960), Bolivian economist
- José Ballivián (1805 – 1855), the 9th president of Bolivia from 1841 to 1847
- Adolfo Ballivián (1831 – 1874), the constitutional president of Bolivia from 1873 to 1874
- Hugo Ballivián (1901 – 1995), the de facto president of Bolivia from 1951 to 1952

== Places ==
- Lake Ballivián, a Pleistocene high lake stage of Lake Titicaca
- José Ballivián Province, in the Beni department in northern Bolivia
