= Motherhood in the Spanish Civil War =

Spanish Civil War: Politicized motherhood

Motherhood in the Spanish Civil War period was a political concept around the idea of women's involvement in support of the state. The blending of definitions of motherhood and womanhood had been occurring in Spain long before this however, with a woman's role being defined as being in the house part of a biological determinism perspective supported by male run institutions in Spain, including the Government and the Catholic Church.

The role of motherhood was debated when it came to women's education. Those on the left argued it was important for the emancipation of women, while those on the right argued it was important for preparing girls and young women in becoming mothers. Little changed during the Dictatorship of Primo de Rivera, except biological determinism became more prominent.

The Second Spanish Republic allowed them to formally enter the public sphere en masse, while also seeing a number of rights available to women for the first time like the right to vote, divorce and access to higher education. Motherhood became more political, and in some circles gender non-conforming women and mother were met with increased hostility. Rights earned by women were viewed by Nationalists as a degeneration of Spain, which would result in the destruction of the Spanish family. Organizations were created to support traditional definitions of Spanish motherhood. Public violence against women and mothers defending striking workers also increased.

The Spanish Civil War saw definitions of motherhood become more political, but still traditional in that womanhood was defined as motherhood. Life in rural areas for mothers could remain largely apolitical but it also saw the upset of the family structure in some places as houses emptied of men or those who remained had to be less traditionally masculine in order to survive. Gender roles were also broken as many women went to the front and many mothers needed to work outside the home to serve war efforts.

The end of the war ushered in the period of Francoist Spain, and the return of motherhood defined around traditional Spanish Catholicism supported by a series of laws that made women wards of their fathers and husbands. Education for girls and women again focused on maintaining the home and becoming good mothers.

== Definition of motherhood ==
The definition of motherhood in from the pre-Second Republic to the Francoist period is womanhood is motherhood, and motherhood was womanhood. This definition of motherhood as womanhood was rarely challenged, and would remain part of a Spanish status quo dating back to an earlier period of Catholic Spain.

== Prelude to the Second Republic (1800–1922) ==
=== Definition of motherhood ===
"If it were necessary the quality of [skull's] volume to perform with equal power, the inferiority of women would be in all areas. Her senses would be clumsier, and in accordance to Fall's capacity categorization, her circumspection would be inferior as would her sense of location, her love of property, her sense of justice, her disposition for the arts, etc. ... But nothing like this transpires: Women in most abilities are equal to men and their intellectual differences begin where their different education starts. Indeed their teachers soon realize the differences between boys' and girls' talent, and if there is any it is in favor of girls, who are more docile and in general more precocious."

-- Concepción Arenal in Woman of the Future in 1916

During the late 1800s, women and mothers were viewed by men as fragile creatures, subject to the whims of their body, and captive to illness and suffering centered around menstruation, pregnancy and menopause. According to male thought leaders in Spain, these illnesses necessitated women to remain at home and serve in their natural duty of procreation. Social order was defined around biological order expressed through sex differences. These beliefs were supported by male physicians inside Spain and around Europe. Motherhood was defined around biological determinism.

=== Education ===
The cultural situation in Spain resulted in a largely uneducated female population, with the literary rate for women only at 10% in 1900. The number of women known to have university titles in the period between 1800 and 1910 was around one, with María Goyri being the exception among Spanish women. This began to slowly change, with the literacy rate for women being 62% by 1930 and the gender ratio in schools being close to 50/50 on the primary school level.

Motherhood would play an important role around education in Spain starting in the 1860s, as a debate began to emerge over what role education should play in the lives of women. Women's rights advocates, like Concepción Arenal who posed as a man to get a law degree in the 1860s, argued that women were just as smart as men. The only difference was that women lack access to education, and providing women with an education would open up opportunities for them outside the home. Emilia Pardo Bazán was another voice in this period advocating for increased access to education for women from a feminist perspective. She published her ideas in publications like London's Fortnightly Review and Spanish magazine Nuevo Teatro Crítrico. On the other side, male leadership often argued for education for women as part of their goals of strengthening the state. They believed educating women in schools to become better wives and mothers would aid the state, by providing a backbone to support the next generation of male leaders.

=== Childbirth ===
The birthrate for women in Spain in the 1800s was 44 per thousand people. Midwives needed to be approved before being given a license. Women were sometimes confined to bed for a period of sometime after giving birth. Francisca Iracheta published the first book by a woman on midwifery in Spain in 1870. It used a question and answer style method to teach future midwives, and also contained illustrations of the pelvis. Infant mortality rates were very high in the late 1800s and early 1900s, and many children in Spain were born out of wedlock.

=== Organizations ===
==== Agrupación de Trabajadores ====
Agrupación de Trabajadores was created as a labor organization in 1891 by Teresa Claramunt to support her feminist ideals, and soon organized public meetings. The organization argued that women were being doubly punished by society, as women were expected to work outside the home to provide for the family while at the same time to meet all the domestic needs of the households. The organization was never particularly successful in its goals as many women in the workforce did not see a need for representation by a union.

== Dictatorship of Primo de Rivera (1923-1930) ==
=== Definition of motherhood ===
Motherhood can not be a pretext for curtailing women's rights and aspirations, because after the hardest period of gestation, it remains in full capacity for both; to say that the woman, being a mother, can not be any more, it is as absurd as if the man, as a father, were established limits and restrictions on his intellectuality and privileges. (...) The woman wants to be treated, not tolerated; wants to be the same, not inferior.

-- Amparo Poch y Gascón in The Voice of Aragon on 28 November 1928

Maternidad y Feminismo was published in 1926 and written by Gregorio Marañon. A leading medical figure of the time, Marañon defined both genders in the book by their biological roles, using science to justify women's role as mothers as women where characters by an anabolic metabolism, which made them have a need to synthesize and accumulate things in a passive manner. The passive nature of an egg in the fertilization process and its need to nest in the uterus during pregnancy explained the need, according to Marañon, for women to maintain passive roles in the home taking care of children as a primary function. This definition was mirrored by Antonio Vallejo-Nágera in his 1937 text, Eugenesia de la Hispanidad. He also argued that this definition was important for the continuation of the state.

=== Feminism ===
In the lead up to the founding of the Second Republic and the Civil War, many middle class and upper-class women who became feminists did so as a result boarding school educations resulting in parents unable to guide the evolution of their political thoughts, fathers encouraging daughters towards political thinking, or being indoctrinated in classes essentially aimed at reinforcing societal gender norms. Left leaning families were more likely to see their ideas manifested by their daughters as feminists through active influence. Right leaning families were more likely to see their daughters become feminists through rigid gender norms resulting in a familial break.

=== Education ===
For many leading male figures in this period, the education of girls and women was not important in substance. What mattered was the content should be focused around preparing girls and women in serving their husbands and in becoming good mothers.

== Second Spanish Republic (1931 - 1937) ==
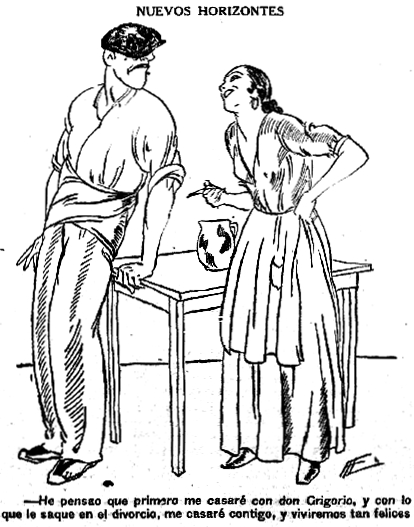
Caricature of Gracia y Justicia, conservative magazine of political humor published in Spain during the Second Republic. It shows a woman with her boyfriend, both humble, planning her marriage to a wealthy man (Don Gregorio) only to get his fortune after the divorce. The vignette is part of the campaign organized by Catholic right media and parties in order to avoid the legalization of divorce. In the text that accompanies the cartoon reads: "I thought that first I will marry Don Gregorio, and with the money that I will take from him in the divorce, I will marry you and live happily."

One of the most important things about the Second Republic for women is it allowed them to formally enter the public sphere en masse. The period also saw a number of rights available to women for the first time. This included the right to vote, divorce and access to higher education.

=== Elections in the Second Republic ===
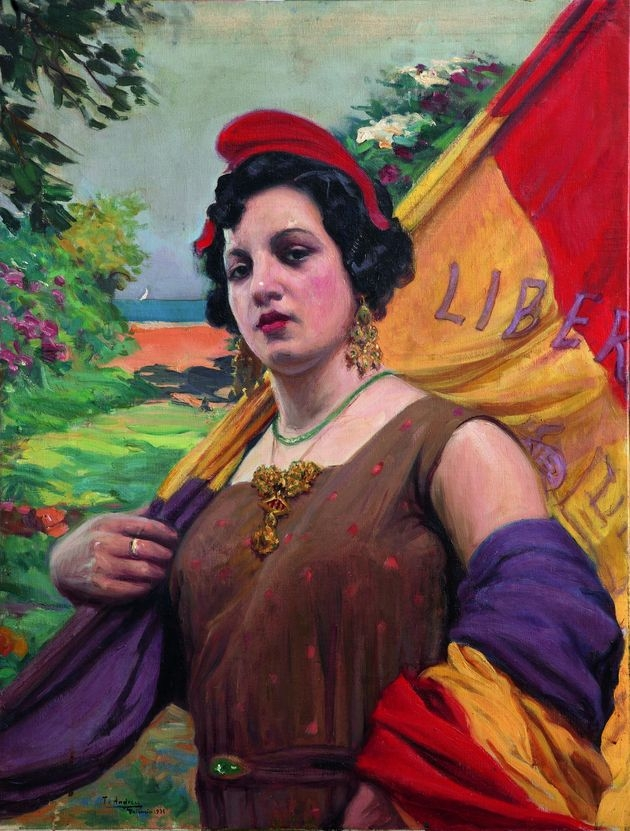
"República Española" (1931) by painter Teodoro Andreu.

The Spanish monarchy ended in 1931. Following this and the end of the Dictatorship of Primo de Rivera, the Second Republic was formed. The Second Republic had three elections before being replaced by the Franco dictatorship. These elections were held in 1931, 1933 and 1936.

A few on the right supported women's suffrage as they saw it as likely benefiting them, which it did in the sense of providing additional support in the 1933 elections that saw a right wing government come to power. This support was based around their idea of Spanish motherhood, where women were subservient to men, men were subservient to the Catholic Church, and the Catholic Church could then influence election outcomes through the women's vote. This was indeed part of the reason some prominent women on the left, including Victoria Kent Siano and Margarita Nelken y Mansbergen, opposed women's suffrage.

==== February 1936 elections ====
During the elections, pamphlets were distributed in Seville that warned women that a leftist Republican victory would result in the government removing their children from their homes and the destruction of their families. Other pamphlets distributed by the right in the election warned that the left would turn businesses over to the common ownership of women.

=== Attitudes regarding non-conforming women ===
For the 1936 May Day celebrations, the Communist Party of Spain worked hard to convey a perception that they were one of the dominant political groups in the country by turning out party members in Madrid. They successfully organized hundred of Communist and Socialist women to participate in a march, where they chanted "Children yes, husbands no!" (Spanish: ¡Hijos sí, maridos no!) with their fists clenched in the air behind huge Lenin and Stalin banners. This was particularly upsetting to male military members on the National right, including General Primo de Rivera who wrote about the incident in a letter. They saw it as women wrongly challenging Spain's traditional gender roles.

=== Women's rights ===
The economic reality informed the woman, completely ignorant of the naive pleasure of primitive life, that the House excluded her from all the tasks of production, from all the public works that give the right to subsistence. This came to him through the man to whom he rendered his private services, including sexual ones; and he defended himself in his new position, worrying about strengthening the ties that bound him to man.

-- Amparo Poch y Gascón in Mujeres Libres, Number 3 in the July 1936 edition.

Legal equality for women was opposed by many on Spain's right. They saw it as a degeneration of Spain, which would result in the destruction of the Spanish family. This tension about the rights of women was part of their tension over the existence of the Republic, and one of the reason they were opposed to it.

=== Organizations ===
==== Sección Femenina de la Falange Española ====
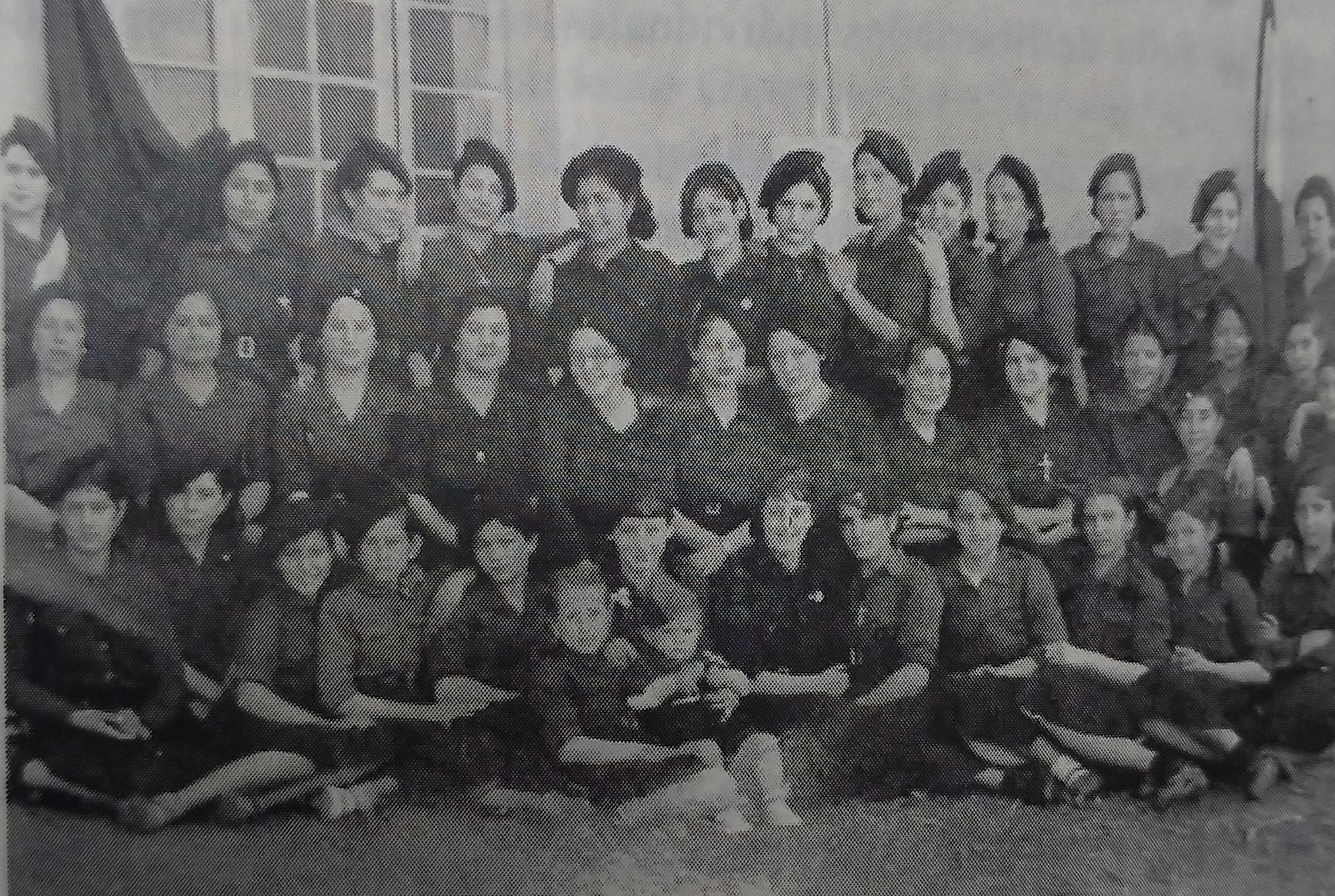
The comrades of Sección Femenina de Falange de Santa Marta. Photo by Inés Cabellero de León. 1936.

Sección Femenina de la Falange Española was founded in 1934. It was led by Pilar Primo de Rivera, sister of José Antonio Primo de Rivera, as a women's auxiliary organization of Falange. Fascist in the mold of Mussolini's Italian party, both organizations were misogynistic in their approach to the goals of building a revolutionary organic society that would support traditional Spanish values. There were three things they saw as critical to doing this: the family, the municipality and the syndicate. Using traditional gender roles from the Catholic Church, they would impose their values on women in the home. Given its goals of making women docile participants in civic life, the women's organization does not meet the definition of a feminist organization. It was the only major Nationalist women's political organization, with a membership of 300 in 1934. By 1939, Sección Femenina would eclipse the male run party in memberships, with over half a million women belonging to the group.

==== Acción Católica de la Mujer ====
Women involved in Acción Católica de la Mujer (ACM) were involved in challenges to the Second Republic's laws that prohibited Catholic ceremonies and civic activities, including religious processions through towns. They often defied these laws, and were at the front of processionals in order to insure they were allowed to practice their more conservative version of Catholicism. Mothers also continued to enroll their children in and support Catholic education in spite of government attempts to limit it. Despite these political activities, male leadership in the Catholic Church and broader right leaning society attempted to get the ACM to be less political during the Second Republic. They encouraged ACM leadership to focus more on doing charity work, and on assisting working-class families.

To this end, conservative leaders successfully oversaw the merger of ACM with the Unión de Damada del Sagrado Corazón in 1934. The new organization was called the Confederación de Mujeres Católics de Espana (CMCE). As a successful consequence, membership numbers dropped from 118,000 in 1928 to 61,354 members. It also saw the resignation of the more politically active women leaders from the newly formed CMCE. The newly merged organization also encouraged women explicitly to be less political, and participate in at most one or two demonstrations a year.

=== Education ===
The Second Republic had a goal of educating women. This was viewed as a radical concept, and many reactionaries inside the Republic were opposed to it. Many others supported it, seeing education as a tool to allow women to pass along Republican values to their children.

=== Childbirth ===
The Second Republic saw for the first time the introduction of maternity care being offered by the government. Women were also given access to contraception for the first time. In the latter part of the Republic, women would also be given access to abortion during the first three months of their pregnancies. Divorce by mutual consent was allowed for the first time, and the law made no distinction between illegitimate and legitimate births.

Amparo Poch y Gascón played a critical role as a medical professional during the Second Republic in Madrid. She published Cartilla de Consejos a las Madres in December 1931. She set up Puente de Vallecas Medical Clinic in Madrid in May 1934. Focusing on improved sanitation at medical facilities and encouraging women to change their lifestyles during pregnancy, her work helped to drop the number of infant deaths by 1936 across the city. Her work on infant mortality continued in the Civil War period.

=== Pre-war interactions with the Guardia Civil and Falange ===
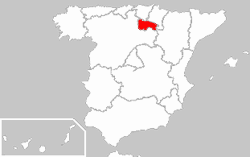
Location of La Rioja, home region to Arnedo near Logroño, where four women were killed in 1931.

Near the end of 1931, workers at a shoe factor in the village of Arnedo near Logroño were fired because they were members of Unión General de Trabajadores (UGT). Villagers decided to protest their firing outside the townhall, and were fired upon for no discernible reason by the Guardia Civil. Four women, a child and a male worker were killed, while another thirty were injured.

Falangists were seeking to engage in attacks that would provoke Republican reprisals in 1935 and 1939. One such attack occurred on 9 March 1936 in Granada during a strike by workers. A squad of Falangist loyalist fired on workers, and their families who were protesting with them. Among the wounded were many women and children. The left in the city immediately retaliated by calling for a general strike, and people in the city setting fire to the offices of Falange, Acción Popular, the offices of the newspaper Ideal and two churches.

=== October Revolution of 1934 ===
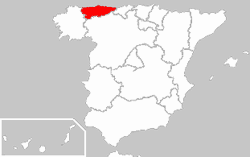
Location of Asturias, Spain.

Women played roles behind the scenes in one of the first major conflicts of the Second Republic, when workers' militias seized control of the mines in Asturias. Originally planned as a nationwide strike, the workers collective action only really took place in Asturias. Some women were involved in propaganda and others in assisting the miners. After the government quelled the insurrection by bringing in Moroccan legionaries, some 30,000 people found themselves in prison and another 1,000 were put into graves. A large number of those put into prison were women. Women also played an advocacy role in trying to see their husbands and male relatives released.

During the Austrian miners action, the government of the Second Republic responded by arresting thousands of miners and closing down their workers centers. Women rose up to support striking and imprisoned miners by advocating for their release and taking jobs to support their families. Partido Comunista de España (PCE) male leadership strove to find roles for women that better comported with what they saw as more acceptable for their gender and better fit into the new, more conservative legal framework being created by the Second Republic. This included changing the name of the Committee for Women against War and Fascism to Pro-Working Class Children Committee. PCE's goal and the actual result was to discourage women's active participation in labor protests.

During the Asturian conflict, there were a few instances of women initiated violence. This fed into paranoia among those on the right that women would violently try to seize power from men. Both on the left and the right, these women were not viewed as heroic, and men wanted to limit their potential for further political action. Women were also involved in building barricades, clothing repair, and street protests. For many women, this was the first time they were civically engaged without a male chaperone as in many cases, they were working on behalf of imprisoned male relatives.

== Spanish Civil War (1936–1939) ==
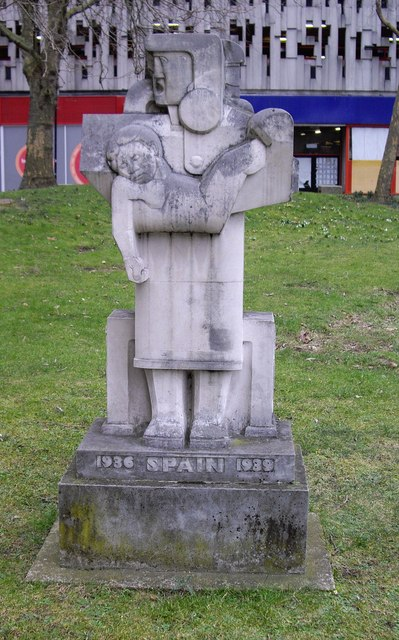
Spanish Civil War Memorial in its original location between the former Civic Centre and the Broad Street Mall in Reading, England depicting mother and dead child.

=== Definition of motherhood ===
Definitions of motherhood became explicitly political in this period. On the Republic side, the concept of "combative motherhood" began to develop, where motherhood was defined by a willingness to heroically their sons on behalf of Republican ideals, and mothers encouraging their sons to be willing to sacrifice their lives on behalf of those ideals. Unlike Nationalist definitions of motherhood in this period, Republican definitions allowed women some autonomy outside that of their husbands or the fathers of their children. These Republican definitions were also aided by figures such as Dolores Ibárruri, who portrayed motherhood as similar to that of Mary and the Passion of Christ. These Republican definitions though continued to support a basic definition of womanhood as motherhood.

=== Role in the family ===
Mothers had a variety of different experiences during the Civil War depending on their personal situations. Many mothers in rural areas were apolitical, no matter what side of the front they lived on. They had little access to resources that would have allowed them to be politically engaged, and were often short on resources required for basic living.

During the war, mothers worked hard to try to maintain a sense of normalcy. This included continuing domestic education, both among Republican and Nationalist women. Topics of focus included understanding the water, agriculture and religious education. Spanish sayings used by mothers at this time included, "After you eat, do not read a single letter." Reading was not viewed as good for digestion. Children were also encouraged by their mothers in rural areas to take a siesta after a meal. Mothers would often engage in activities like slapping and hitting their children as a way of reinforcing social education. Songs played an important part of rural life for women, in that singing signaled a woman was happy. For mothers, songs served another important function of passing along social values to their children. Songs also passed along messages about gender roles, including the importance of outward appearance. During the war, many mothers went to great lengths to try to feed their children during periods of food shortages. They might sneak into other towns to try to get food rations when the ration in their town was too small. They might forgo eating themselves so their children could have bigger portions.

For many mothers in rural areas, the idea of being politically engaged was not possible. They had too many things they had to do at home to have time for that. They had to make soap. They had to work in the fields because of national rationing. Most Spanish homes during the war lacked running water at home. Mothers had to acquire water from local wells, lakes or rivers. They had to wash clothing for the whole family, making a journey to a body of water to do that. They also had to be home to prepare food when it was available. Most homes at this time did not have modern kitchens, and mothers had to cook over open flames using hay and wood for heat.

The war upset the social structure inside the family. Because of survival issues related to food and fear of political persecution, the skills of mother in acquiring and preparing food while also remaining politically invisible meant they began to take on the role of head of household. Silence became a virtue, because doing or saying the wrong thing could lead to death at the hands of Nationalist forces. Women were less likely to be harassed than men, which meant they were often more out of the home. This could create tensions behind closed doors, as it attacked traditional Spanish definitions of masculinity as it made the home the domain of the mother. This change of women being the boss of the home would continue after the Civil War for both Republican and Nationalist families.

Republican mothers had to deal with conflicting definitions of motherhood, and an increasing realization that the Republican side would lose. They were left with few choices in how to deal with this. Some responded by trying to instill Republican values in their children with a belief that the Republic would return. Others responded by hiding their own Republican leanings and having their children avoid Republican related activities in order to avoid them facing consequences during a Francoist government.

=== Gender roles ===
The Spanish Civil War served to break traditional gender roles on the Republican side. It allowed women to fight openly on the battlefield, a rare occurrence in twentieth century European warfare. The war also served to remove the influence of the Catholic Church in defining gender roles on the Republican side. While the war broke down gender norms, it did not create an equitable employment change or remove the domestic tasks as the primary role of women. Behind the scene, away from the front, women serving in personal family and Republican opposition support roles were still expected to cook for soldiers, launder their uniforms, look after children and tend to dwellings. Women supporting CNT militants found themselves at once liberated from these gender roles, but still expected to serve male fighters in traditional roles.

The most successful female political periods in this period survived by not challenging these gender norms and not threatening their male colleagues. Examples of such women include Dolores Ibárruri. This contrasted with figures like Margarita Nelken y Mansbergen whose gender presentation upset men.

=== Media depictions of women ===
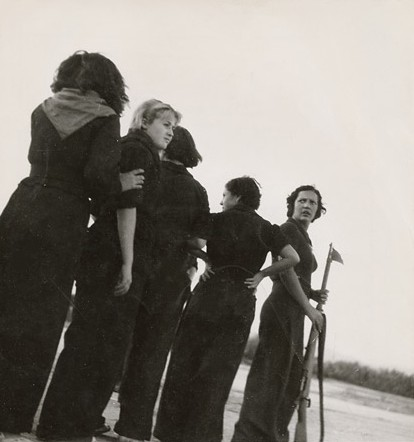
Republican milicianas in training during the Spanish Civil War.

Nationalist propaganda held help the image of the mujer castiza. She was modest, pure, asexual, self-sacrificing and traditional, supporting the Spanish family through work at home. She was the anti-thesis of the Republican fighter in that she was far away from the front, serving an important role as a mother and would never leave her family to be involved in combat. This contrasted with the imagery of Republican milicianas, who were sometimes depicted as mothers who went to the front to fight for their families.

=== Civilian women on the home front ===
Victory... will be forged by the sacrifice of those sons whom you had such difficulty bearing, and from whom you have so much hope. This blood, which flows so generously, is yours; it is the blood of the most generous of our women.

-- Communist propaganda aimed at Republican women during the Spanish Civil War

Many poor, illiterate and unemployed women often found themselves immersed in the ideological battle of the Civil War and its connected violence as a result of forces beyond her control. Some of these women, mostly on the left, chose to try to reassert control by becoming active participants in the violent struggle going on around them. When it came to deciding who was right and wrong, many women had to use their own moral judgement formed by a lifetime to do so. They were not guided by political radicalization leading to ideological based morality.

Women and children behind the lines were used by all sides, as a way of trying to garner support for their sides in the Civil War both internally and internationally. Nationalists often appealed to Catholics overseas, condemning Republican bombings on women in civil populations, claiming over 300,000 women and children had been killed. This met with limited success in the United States, where Catholics were uneasy with bombings against women and children that were being committed by both sides.

In the Republican offensive against Nationalist held Teruel from December 1937 to February 1938, brigades on the ground tried to honor Indalecio Prieto's call to protect civilians, and particularly women and children. They sometimes stopped shelling buildings when people inside made clear they were non-combatant women and children. The reality of the offensive and life on the front lines meant many of those civilians had nothing. Women would often risk their lives to loot recently shelled buildings. They needed furniture to burn to melt snow for water, to cook and to provide some heat. Many women, on both sides in the city, died of starvation during the month long battle.

==== Nationalist women on the Nationalist homefront ====
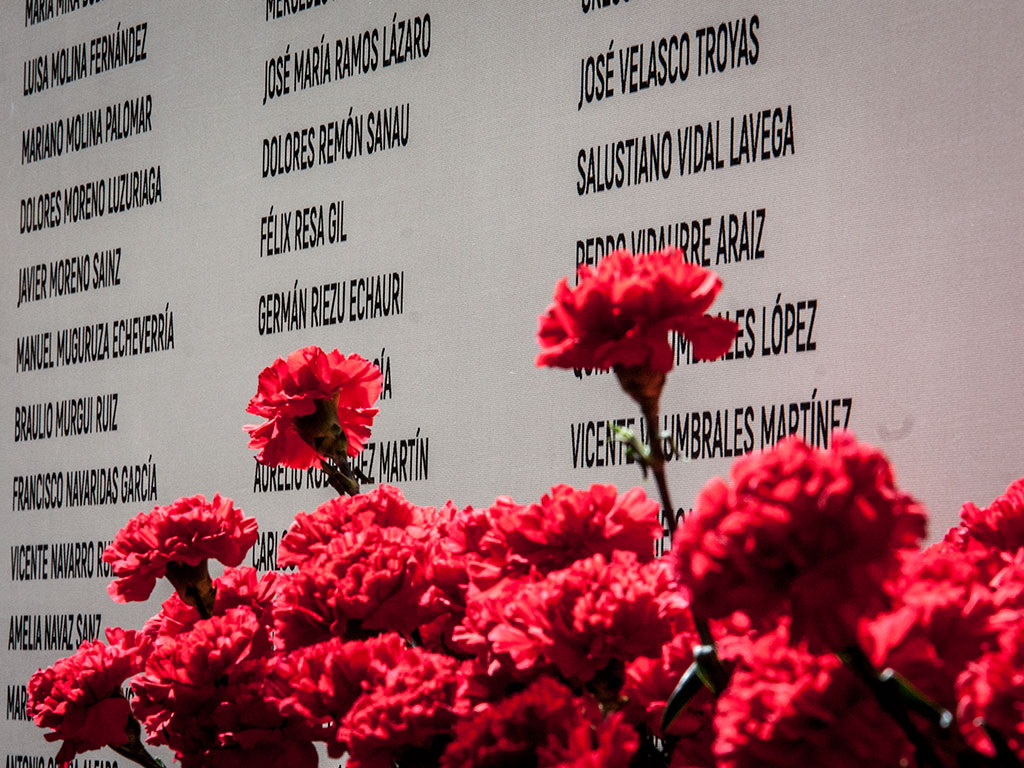
Memorial plaque in Pamplona with the list of teachers murdered and cracked down on in the rearguard of Navarre by the Spanish Nationalists, 1936 and later.

Falangist women activists were often divided into groups, which were largely based on age. Younger activists often to be outside the home, working on Nationalist goals in Nationalist women's organizations. Older women Nationalist activists believed they should be outside the public eye, serving Nationalist interests by working in the home. Nationalist women in more rural, less cosmopolitan cities, often had more privileges than their urban counterparts. They were able to leave the house, regardless of their marital status, and engage in the everyday tasks required for living. Few people noticed and cared. While Nationalist forces believed women should be at home, the realities of war meant that women were required to work outside the home, in factories and other businesses. During the war, Nationalist publications encouraged women to stay at home in service of the family. They were discouraged from shopping, going to the movies and engaging in other behavior viewed as frivolous by Nationalist male leaders.

==== Republican women behind Nationalist lines ====
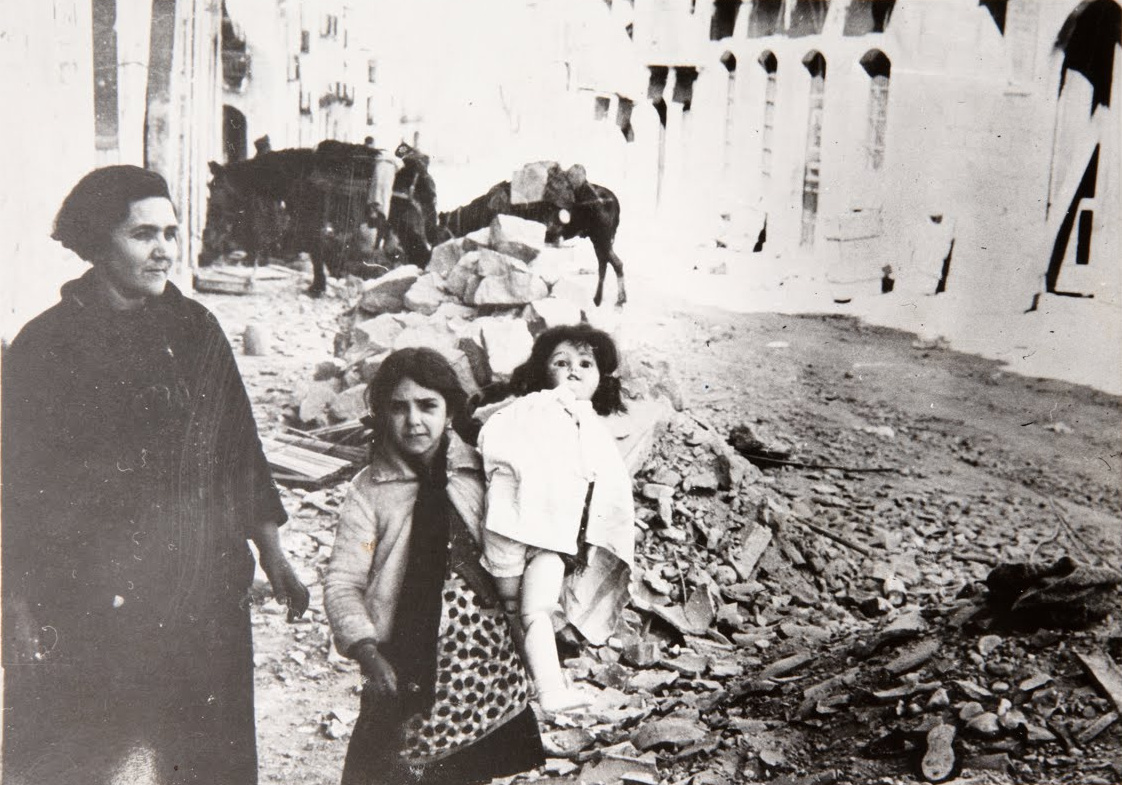
A girl with her doll in 1938 after a bombing.

Behind Nationalist lines, all women were forbidden from wearing pants. Instead, women were to wear skirts, which had to be long. Shirts were required to be long sleeved. Rape was so common that many pregnant women did not know who the fathers of their children were. Rape, along with murder and torture, were frequent tools used by Nationalist forces to instill terror in women and keep them in line.

When Constantina was taken by Nationalist forces on 7 August, those forces sought revenge for anarchist shooting of Nationalist prisoners. Women who had found themselves widowed recently or who had husbands serving with the Legionaries were raped in a mass orgy event fueled by alcohol provided by local wineries. On 10 August, show trials were held and many women were given death sentences for things like displaying Republican flags, expressing admiration for President Roosevelt or criticizing their employers. Among the women executed were two pregnant girls.

20 women believed to be Republican sympathizers were removed from a maternity ward in Toledo and executed. The Nationalist soldiers then threw their bodies down a nearby well, and proceeded to parade through a local village with the dead women's underwear draped on their rifles.

== Francoist Spain (1938–1973) ==
=== Definition of motherhood ===
Following the end of the Second Republic, Francoist propaganda set about to eradicate beliefs that had arisen during the Second Republic that suggested womanhood had a definition of emancipation and was beyond that of biological motherhood. It strove to recast women and mothers as "Angels of the Hearth" who were courageous, modest, moral and self-sacrificing. Women were defined as a separate species, where sex definitions were based on being a natural species that exists purely to procreate. The fascist regime was supported by the Catholic Church and Sección Feminina, who all saw defining women as mothers as important for supporting the structures of the state. This definition of motherhood was then frozen, remaining until the end of the regime.

=== Identities as women and mothers ===
Overall, the end of the Civil War proved a double loss for Republican women, as it first took away the limited political power and newly won identities as women they had won during the Second Republic and it secondly forced them back into the confines of their homes.

Life in exile dislocated some Republican mothers from their identities as mothers. While mothers, they created identities based around being political activists. Motherhood was not an identity some of them felt they could afford, as they saw greater importance in accomplishing political goals and their identities around that. Priorities changed after the war.

For many women in rural Spain and many mothers living in pueblos, the repressive nature of the Civil War and women needing to take charge of the family in rural Spain led to feelings of solidarity among women. It led to mothers creating a form of female specific identity that had largely not existed in rural Spain prior to the war.

=== Role in the family ===
Motherhood became the primary social function of women in Francoist Spain. Still, this critical societal role it was one the regime only wanted to see perpetuated among those who shared in their political ideology. Children of mothers with leftist or Republican leanings were often removed from their care in order to prevent mothers from sharing their ideology with their offspring.

A law passed on 30 March 1940 meant Republican women could keep their children with them in prison until the child turned three years old. At this point, children were then put into state care to prevent the contagion of Republican thinking from spreading. The number of children removed from Republican mothers between 1944 and 1954 was 30,960. These children were not allowed to remain in contact with their families, and many found themselves in centers run by Auxilio Social. When mothers were released from prisons, they were often watched to make sure they were good mothers as defined by the state. Actively surveiled, many women lost custody of new children they had.

Because many women and mothers had husbands, sons and fathers in prison, Republican mothers in this period had their specific role of mother defined and organized around providing support for family members behind bars. It was expected of them, and these mothers often formed support groups among themselves and in aide of prisoners. The included getting books for prisoners, raise funds for prisoners, campaign for better treatment of prisoners, and campaign for their release.

Republican mothers abroad addressed the problem of specifically being targeted by Franco's regime by created the Unión de Mujeres Españoles (UME) in France. The purpose of the organization was to legitimize political activity of mothers as being part of the broader efforts of "female consciousness." UME published a magazine called Mujeres Antifascistas Españolas. The publication linked Republican women in exile with those in Spain, including some who were in prison. It honored women's roles as front line combatants, and suggested the special role of motherhood made their voices more valuable when it came to speaking out against the problems of the Franco regime. This contrasted to Spanish Communist women in exile beliefs, which suggested mothers in this period should fade into the background, serving in roles that supported single women and men who could be more visible in the struggle against Franco. Communists emphasized a traditional view of motherhood espoused by Franco.

=== Gender roles ===
The end of the Civil War, and the victory of fascist forces, saw the return of traditional gender roles to Spain. This included the unacceptability of women serving in combat roles in the military. Where gender roles were more flexible, it was often around employment issues where women felt an economic necessity to make their voices heard. It was also more acceptable for women to work outside the home, though the options were still limited to roles defined as more traditionally female. Women were still required to get permission from their husbands before outside the home. This included working as nurses, or in soup kitchens or orphanages. The Civil War proved a loss for many Republican women.

For some women in Spain, the Francoist period represented a continuation of the Second Republic. Many never felt empowered during the Second Republic and Civil War, and because they were largely behind fronts that saw less disruption to the family structure, the family had never become matriarchal with a mother running the home. This was particularly true in conservative parts of the Basque Country, where a patriarchal family structure with fixed gender roles of men as the head of household and women as subservient mothers continued into the Francoist period.

With strict gender norms back in place, women who had found acceptable employment prior and during the Civil War found employment opportunities even more difficult in the post war period. Teachers who had worked for Republican schools often could not find employment.

Gender norms were further reinforced by Sección Femenina de Falange. Opportunities to work, study or travel required taking classes on cooking, sewing, childcare and the role of women before they were granted. If women did not take or pass these classes, they were denied these opportunities.

=== Education ===
Falange party schools teaching girls focused on the home during the post war period. Girls in the first through third grades were instructed in tidiness of the home and their immediate environments. They were instructed in bringing harmony, balance and softness to their domain of the home. Other school lessons included ones on the virtue of silence or how to carry on audience appropriate conversations. Lessons also explained what was and what was not acceptable for women in the company of others for activities like laughing, sneezing and copying with pain. Such lessons would continue until the late 1950s.

=== Feminism ===
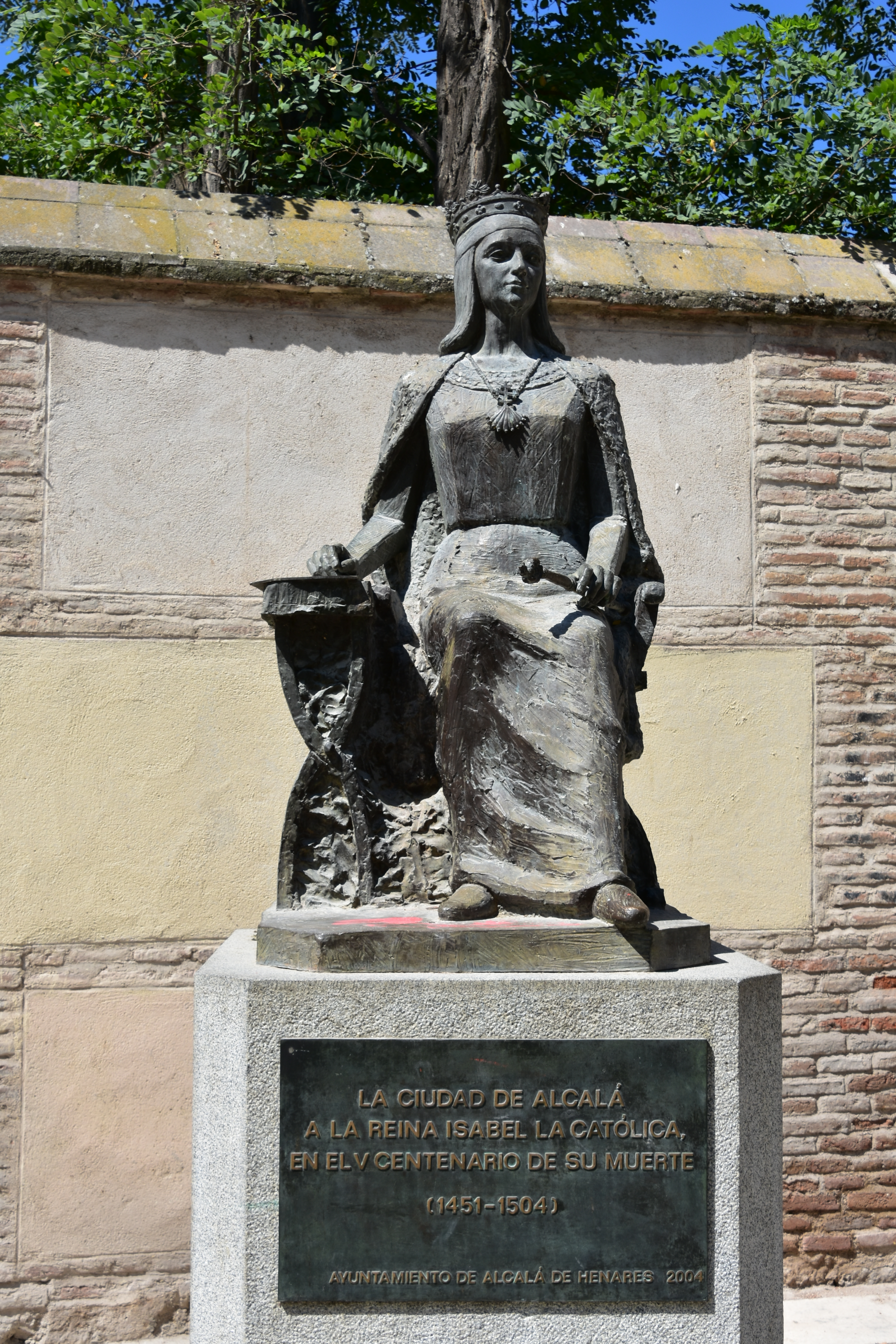
Statue of Isabel the Catholic in Alcala de Henares.

Sección Femenina de Falange worked to depict feminism as a form of depravity. It associated feminism with drug abuse and other evils plaguing society. State supported feminism, expressed through Sección Femenina, offered Isabel the Catholic and Teresa of Avila as symbols for Spanish women to look up. They had first been used by Francoist women during the Civil War, and reminded women that their role was to become mothers and to engage in pious domesticity.

=== Women's rights ===
The pillars for a New Spain in the Franco era became national syndicalism and national Catholicism. Following the Civil War, the legal status for women in many cases reverted to that stipulated in the Napoleonic Code that had first been installed in Spanish law in 1889. In March 1938, Franco suppressed the laws regarding civil matrimony and divorce that had been enacted by the Second Republic. The post Civil War period saw the return of laws that effectively made wards of women. They were dependent on husbands, fathers and brothers to work outside the house. It was not until later labor shortages that laws around employment opportunities for women changed. These laws passed in 1958 and 1961 provided a very narrow opportunity, but an opportunity, for women to be engaged in non-domestic labor outside the household.

The Franco period saw an extreme regression in the rights of women. The situation for women was more regressive than that of women in Nazi Germany under Hitler. Women needed permission to do an array of basic activities, including applying for a job, opening a bank account or going on a trip. The law during the Franco period allowed husbands to killed their wives if they caught them in the act of adultery. Mothers could only get state benefits if they were lawfully married and their children were legitimate.
