= José Brocca =

Spanish pacifist (1891–1950)

José Brocca (Professor José Felix Serafino Alearelo Brocca Ramón, 16 April 1891 – 1950) was a pacifist and humanitarian of the Spanish Civil War, (Prasad, 2005) who allied himself with the Republicans but sought nonviolent ways of resisting the Nationalist rebels.

His parents were Spanish and Italian. He was born at Calle de Zaura no.4, Almería, Andalucia, where his father, Antonio Brocca y Migna, was the Italian Consul. Brocca's mother, Carmen Ladehessa Ramón Vicente, was a former opera singer who had performed in Milan.

== A forgotten history ==
Many people's perception of the Spanish Civil War is one of two monolithic 'sides': a war of the Republicans against the Nationalists. In fact it was by no means as simple as that, and although it was the Republican cause that was more seriously undermined by internal power struggles, there were many factions and sub-groups within both the main groupings. Almost completely overlooked by mainstream historians, there was also a vigorous element of pacifism, and the work of the Spanish arm of the organisation War Resisters' International (WRI) is almost totally forgotten in popular history and neglected by academics. Similarly, and perhaps inevitably, the history of military assistance, particularly through the International Brigades, is far better documented than the role of people dedicated to non-violence, civilian initiatives and non-governmental organisations.

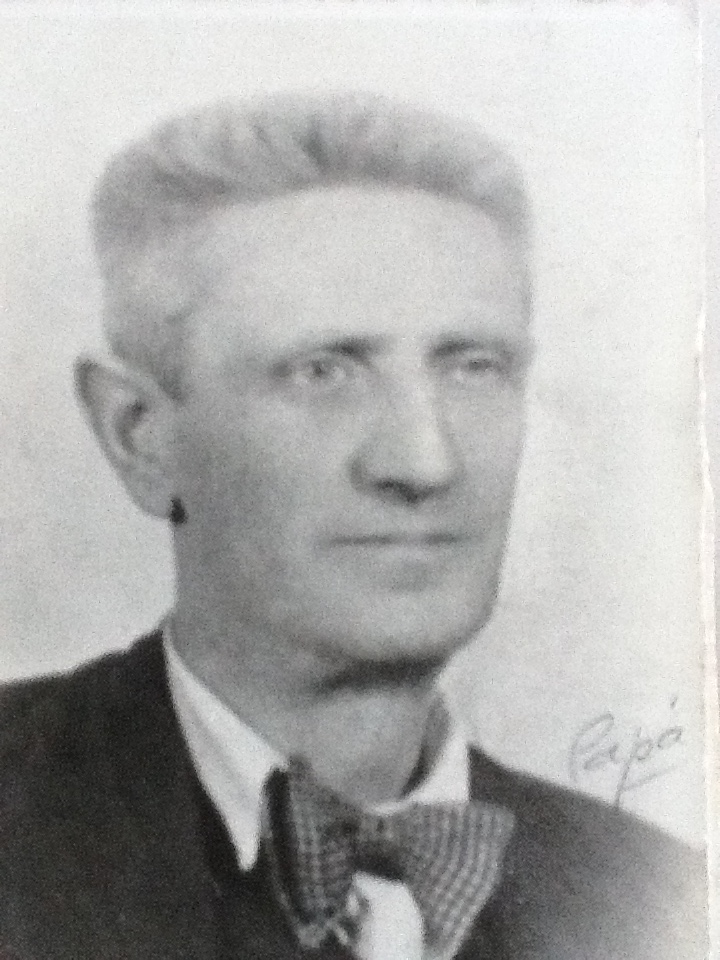
José Brocca as a young school-teacher.

== Viator ==
As with many families, civil war meant uncertainty, movement and separation; but José Brocca's children regarded their formative years as having been spent in the small town of Viator, near Almería, and it is to Viator that family members have returned in order to visit the area with which they feel Brocca is most closely associated. Brocca was a school director at Viator in the early 1930s, and he earned a reputation as a respected community leader. For example, he was instrumental in defying local commercial interests who wanted to prevent a project to bring water to a public fountain in the village. There was once a plaque at the water fountain in Viator commemorating this event, but it has since disappeared. A lifelong internationalist and political activist, Brocca was involved in setting up Escuelas Laicas (secular schools), an initiative which became part of the Republican policy programme.

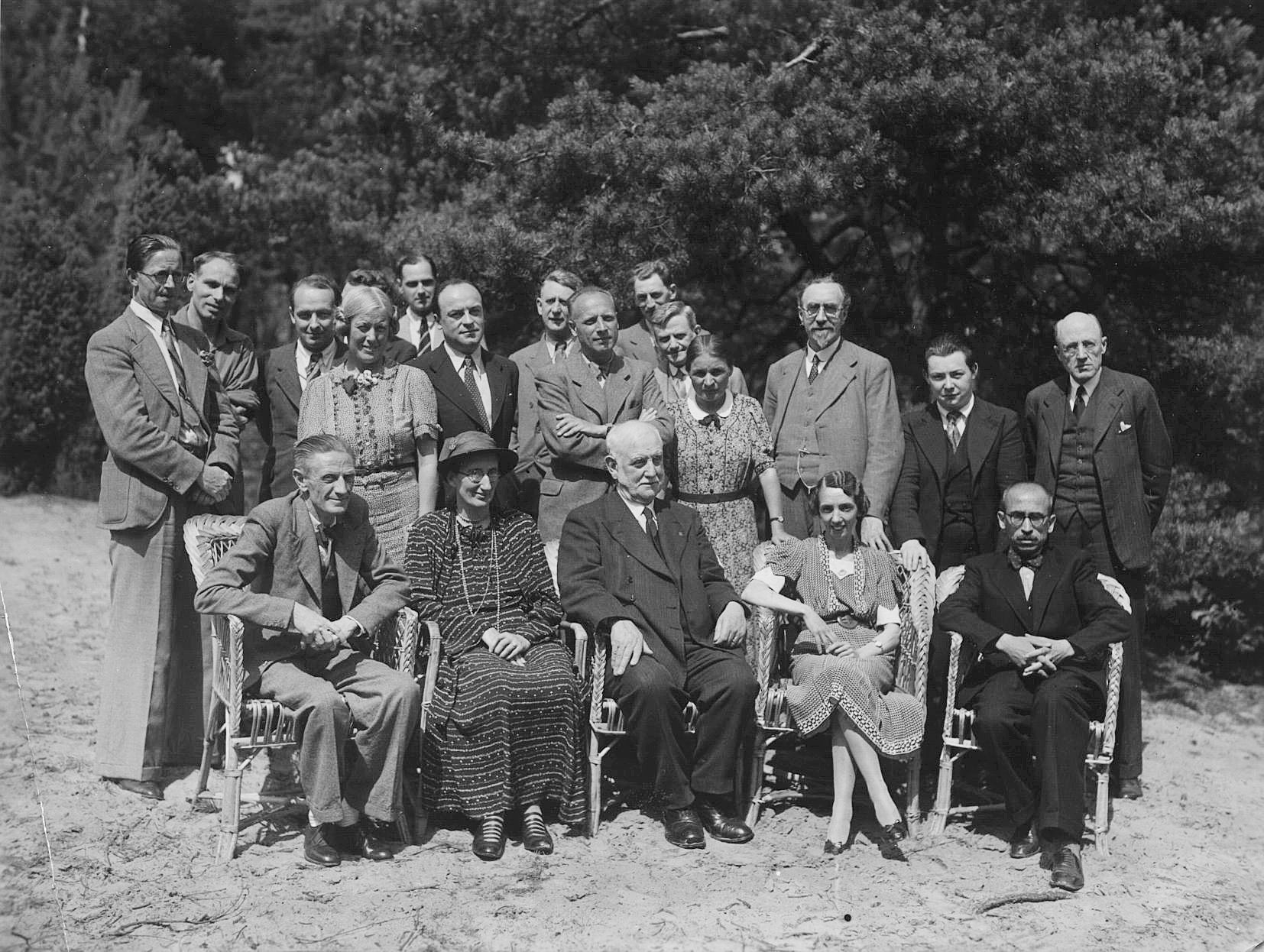
The International Council of the WRI, meeting in Broederschapshuis (The Brotherhood House), Bilthoven, Netherlands in July 1938. Prof. Brocca is seated, far left of the photograph. Among the others pictured are George Lansbury, M.P. (seated, centre); Grace Beaton (seated, second from right); and Herbert Runham Brown (standing, third from right). During this conference of the council, Prof. Brocca was interviewed by American writer Allan A. Hunter for his book White Corpuscles in Europe. The work of the council is documented in Prasad, 2005 (see reference, below). Click on the image for further details of people in the photograph.

Andalucia was quickly caught up in the violence and confusion of the Civil War, and one infamous incident was the shelling of the port of Almería by the Kriegsmarine. As is both metaphorically and literally the way with civil war, brother fought against brother. Brocca's five children were: Arnulfo, Helio, Irma Leticia, Olga Teresa and Humberto. Arnulfo, the eldest, found himself on the rebel side, rose quickly through the ranks, and eventually had a distinguished post-war career as a senior officer in the regular Spanish army, mainly in La Coruňa, before retiring to Huelva then Seville to live with his daughter and family. Humberto was drawn in on the Republican side and died of wounds and sickness contracted on the battlefields.

In spite of the horrors of war and the divisive nature of this war in particular, the four surviving brothers and sisters held warm memories of their childhood in Viator, and kept in touch in the post-war years.

Throughout his life Arnulfo spoke of his father as the 'greatest man who ever lived'. Helio died in 1968, Olga in 2004, Arnulfo in 2005 and Irma in 2009.

Brocca aligned himself with the socialist segment of the complex political spectrum in Spain, and represented Spanish pacifists at international meetings of the peace movement (the Orden del Olivo and War Resisters' International). He was a colleague of anarcha-feminist doctor Amparo Poch y Gascón. He believed that pacifists had to support the Republican cause, but he was first and foremost a humanitarian. There is a local story in Viator which suggests that he helped a Catholic priest escape assassination by giving him his car. From 1933 to 1937 Professor Brocca was in Madrid, where his work included being a school inspector and teaching at the university, while the family home continued to be in Viator. It is believed that at one stage Brocca also spent some time in Buenos Aires, Argentina, where his brother was living.

== A challenge to pacifism ==
Many active pacifists in Europe and the USA found it difficult or impossible to take a neutral view of the Spanish Civil War (Prasad, 2005). Some prominent members of pacifist organisations, like Dr. Albert Einstein, had already renounced pacifism altogether, as a reaction to Hitler's rise to power in Germany. Fenner Brockway resigned from WRI in the early days of the Spanish Civil War (although after World War II with the onset of the Cold War and the nuclear threat he re-affirmed a commitment to pacifism). José Brocca's opinion of the position in Spain was that:

'...the people have had no alternative but to meet violence with violence. It is regrettable, but the entire responsibility for the tragic and bloody days we are enduring lies with those who...have let loose destruction and slaughter to defend, not ideals, but out-of-date and hateful privileges, tending to a set-back to medieval barbarism' (quoted in Brown, 1937).

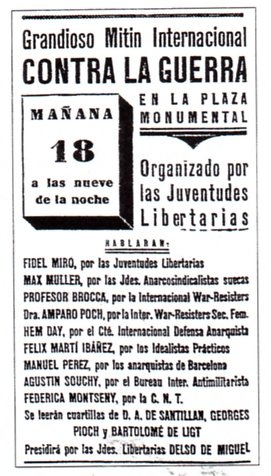
Publicity for an anti-war meeting in the bull ring at Barcelona, with José Brocca as one of the speakers. This was scheduled for 18 July 1936, but was cancelled when the army revolt broke out over the previous night.

Brocca's activism in response to the armed insurrection in Spain was widely quoted by pacifists in the UK and elsewhere as representing a role model. Herbert Runham Brown, Hon. Secretary of the WRI, asked 'What should I do if I were in Spain?' and in answer reproduced parts of a letter from Brocca in which he stated:

'In Barcelona, in Valencia, in the province of Cáceres and in Madrid I have acted, and continue to act, in such interesting tasks as stimulating, directing and organising the peasants so that instead of abandoning their agricultural work, even in those areas abandoned by the fascists in their flight, they work to avoid interruption in production and provision of supplies for the towns; in establishing and organising schools and homes for the children of those citizens who have fallen or who are fighting on the various fronts, and in general taking advantage of all opportunities to spread among the combatants our humanitarian ideals and our repugnance to oppression and cruelty' (Brown, 1937).

Brocca relinquished his government post in Madrid in order to dedicate himself to organising activities such as the purchase and distribution of food and clothing, which was imported through a dock at Valencia financed by the WRI for this purpose; and in Madrid he organised a women's committee to distribute food and collect information on people who were not able to reach relief centres (Bennett, 2003).

== War children ==
During the war the French Catalan town of Prats-de-Mollo-la-Preste (near Perpignan) in the Pyrenees was the location of a refuge financed by the War Resisters' International and run by Professor Brocca and his wife. Helio, Irma and Olga were also there for a time, but were then sent, in the care of Brocca's sister-in-law, to stay with sympathisers in Rouen, until the defeat and occupation of France during the Second World War necessitated their escape from Normandy back to the south.

The Prats-de-Mollo refuge housed children separated from their families, orphans and widows who had escaped from Spain; according to Hunter (1939), at any one time approximately forty people were in residence, and the care of an extra person would always take priority over the purchase of any little 'luxuries'. During his time there Professor Brocca became expert in finding pathways through the Pyrenees and crossed the border many times on various missions which took him in both directions. In effect, the refuge became part of an 'underground railroad' (Agirre, April 1996).

According to Bennett (2003) Brocca disliked traditional orphanages and children's institutions, which to him resembled prisons. Before the war he and Amparo Poch presented the Republican government's Ministry of Health with a plan for 'homes' that would be designed to shelter twenty-five children in the care of a surrogate mother and father. Under wartime conditions, the number of twenty-five was often exceeded, but Bennett records that as well as establishing several children's colonies in southern France, with WRI support Brocca settled five hundred children in Mexico. While the majority of the children came from Republican families, there is evidence in the Sayre Papers (Swarthmore College Peace Collection) that Brocca did not turn away orphans or lost children whose parents were Nationalists.

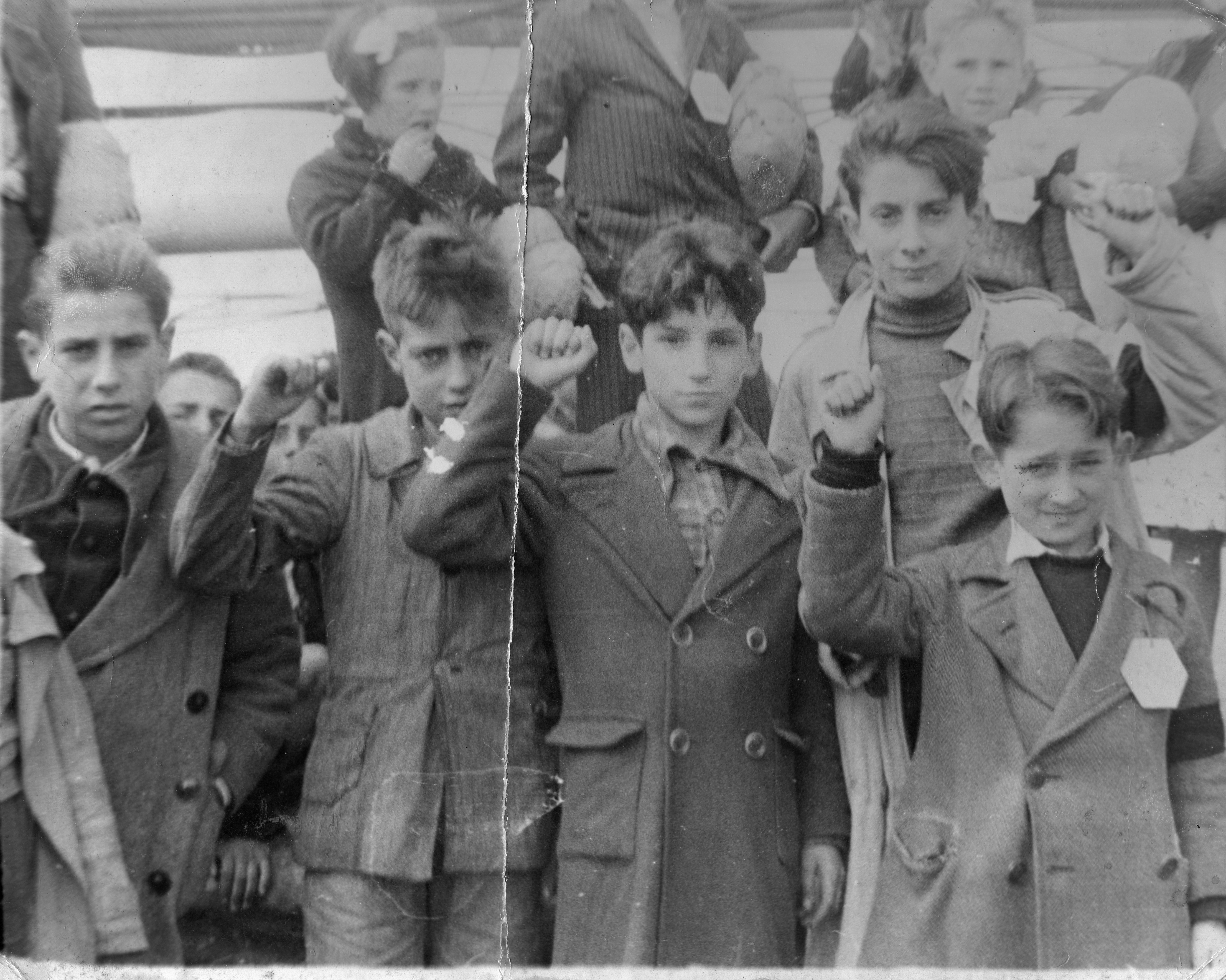
Children preparing for evacuation from Spain.

== Escape and exile ==
After the Civil War had officially ended Professor Brocca refused to leave Prats-de-Mollo until all the children in his care had been returned to safety with their families in Spain. By this time his own life was seriously threatened by the occupying Nazis and their collaborators in Vichy France.

The Prats-de-Mollo refuge was near the route of one of the four main frontier crossings now being used by hundreds of thousands of Spanish refugees as the Republican collapse became inevitable. It was not an easy journey, involving mountain tracks impassable to motor transport. Amparo Poch y Gascón was one who used this route (Rodrigo 2002). She stayed at Prats-de-Mollo for some time before finally reaching Toulouse, where she was to live the rest of her life in exile, and it is reasonable to assume that she was given shelter at the WRI's refuge.

Since Prats-de-Mollo was also the location of one of the large concentration camps set up by the Nazis in this part of occupied France, and since Brocca had been crossing the frontier repeatedly to contact and make possible the flight of anti-militarists and other threatened people out of Spain (Agirre, April 1996), it was clear that his life was now in even greater danger than ever before, and an offer of asylum in the UK was made at the instigation of prominent British pacifists such as Runham Brown, George Lansbury, Grace Beaton, Ruth Fry, and Lord Ponsonby. Brown and Lansbury had initiated a unique arrangement with the British Home Secretary whereby the WRI as a body could act as sponsor for refugees it wished to bring over from Spain and other continental countries where there was a risk of persecution, the WRI itself being underwritten by a panel of guarantors whose names and standing were accepted by the Home Office (Prasad, 2005). However, before Brocca could respond to this offer he was arrested and imprisoned.

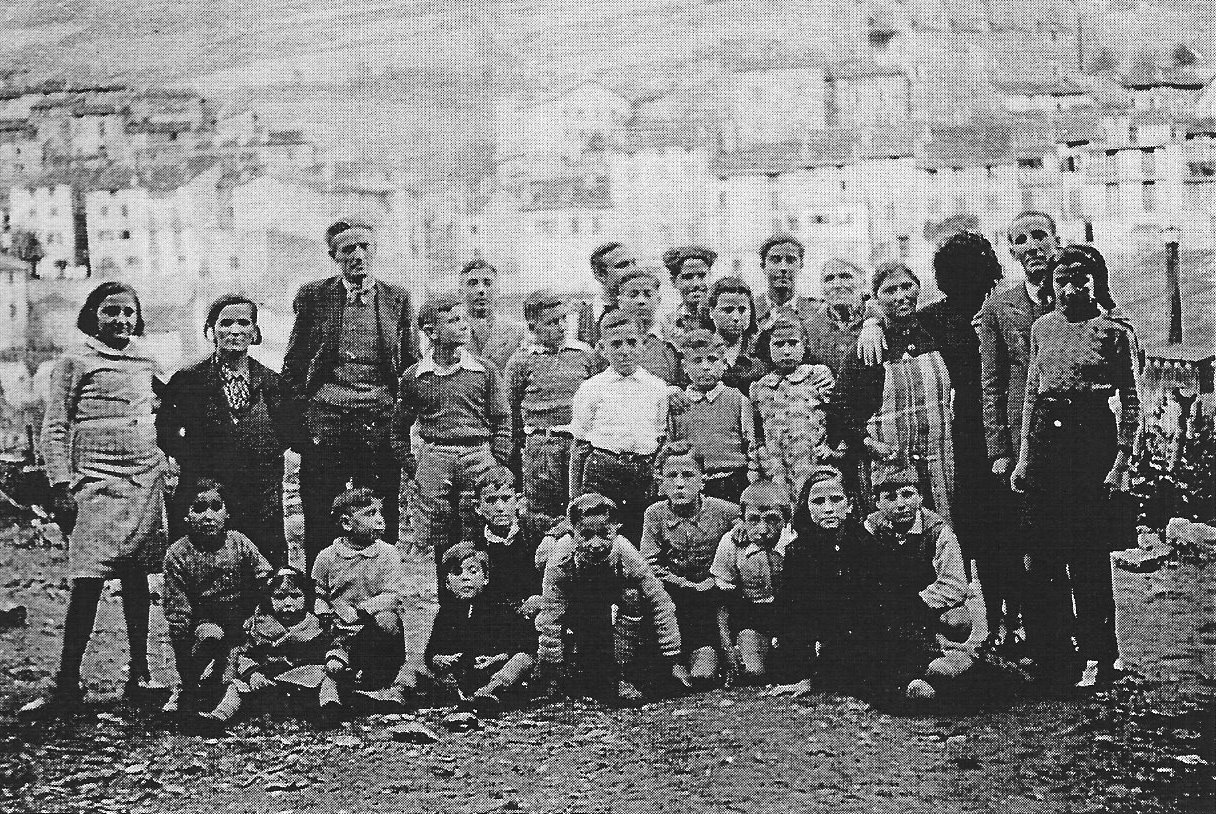
Professor Brocca, standing third from left of picture, with residents of the WRI refuge at Prats-de-Mollo, some time between 1937 and 1939.

Eventually, thanks to the influence of WRI, and with the active help of the French Resistance, Brocca escaped from the concentration camp and left France, finally arriving in Mexico on 17 October 1942 aboard the Portuguese vessel SS Nyassa, a ship well known to many refugees of both the Spanish Civil War and World War II. Evidence in the written archives is sketchy about the period between Brocca's escape from arrest and his arrival in Mexico, but family testimony suggests that for some considerable time neither he nor his wife knew whether the other had survived. The Nazi occupation meant that making enquiries was extremely difficult, despite the best efforts of WRI to establish contact via agencies such as the Red Cross. After many further severe difficulties his wife and one of his sons (Helio) later joined him, having been separated from him for some years. They settled in San Luis Potosí and Mexico City where members of Helio's family still live. Funds towards their airline and boat fares were raised by supporters in the UK, and there was also considerable support from the USA coordinated by John Nevin Sayre of the Fellowship of Reconciliation in New York State. Brocca's other children settled in Wales (Olga), Sweden (Irma) and Spain (Arnulfo).

Professor Brocca never saw Spain again, but died suddenly in June 1950 at the age of 59. He is buried in Mexico City.

== Democracy and optimism ==
In the early 1970s, with the gradual liberalisation that preceded the death of Franco in 1975, and Spain's subsequent transition to democracy, Brocca's widow Rosa García López was able to return to Spain, living for part of that time with relatives in Madrid and with her sister Maria García López who ran a small newspaper and magazine shop in Calle Ecuador, in the 'Casablanca' district of the port city of Vigo, Galicia. Rosa was also able to spend some time reunited with her daughter Olga Brocca Smith and her family in the village of Pyle, near Bridgend, Wales. Olga and her husband were peace activists to the end of their lives.

In his book White Corpuscles in Europe (1939) the American writer Allan A. Hunter views the close of the Spanish Civil War and the opening of World War II from across the Atlantic, and despite the desolate outlook in Europe sees some grounds for optimism in the work of humanitarians including Philippe Vernier (France), Friedrich Siegmund-Schultze (Germany), Pierre Ceresole (Switzerland), Muriel Lester (England), George Lansbury MP (former leader of the UK Labour Party) - and José Brocca, Spain. On page 76, Hunter states:

'Professor Brocca seems to recognise that to fight fascism with the weapons fascists use is self-defeating. If we do as the fascists do then we only endorse fascism. To prevent fascism we have to prevent the desperation, the poverty, the chaos and the ignorance out of which fascism is produced'.

Scott H. Bennett writes of him:

'Brocca's story demonstrates that pacifist courage is no less heroic than the military kind'.

== See also ==
- List of peace activists

== Sources and references ==
=== Books and pamphlets ===
- Bennett, Scott H. (2003) Radical Pacifism: The War Resisters League and Gandhian Nonviolence in America, 1915-1963, Syracuse NY, Syracuse University Press, ISBN 0-8156-3028-X, pp. 67–68.
- Brown, Herbert Runham (1937) Spain: A Challenge to Pacifism, pamphlet, London, War Resisters' International/ The Finsbury Press, pp. 5–6.
- Hunter, Allan A. (1939) White Corpuscles in Europe (foreword by Aldous Huxley), Chicago and New York, Willett, Clarke and Company, pp. 71–82.
- Poch, Amparo, et al., (1938) Notre Travail en France, pamphlet (in French), London, War Resisters' International.
- Prasad, Devi (2005) War is a Crime Against Humanity (foreword by George Willoughby), London, War Resisters' International, ISBN 0-903517-20-5, pp. 167, 179, 198, 205, 207, 212, 217, 230, 260, 462, 463, 482, 504. Prof. Brocca is pictured seated, far left, in photographs 7 and 8 on pp. 522 and 523, and standing, far left, in photograph 27 on page 531.
- Sanchez, Antonio Molina (1990) Cuevas del Almanzora y Garrucha, 1880–1890, Apuntes Para Su Historia, Almeria, Grafika Ediciones. The bibliography cites a report by Professor J. Brocca dated 1921.
- Romeu Alfaro, Fernanda, and Rahona Saure, Alexia (2017) Memoria en Sombra: La Internacional de Resistentes a la Guerra (IRG/WRI) y La Guerra Civil Espanola, (Prologo de Stasa Zajovic), ISBN 978-84-16995-23-3, Barcelona, Ediciones de Intervencion Cultural / El Viejo Topo.

Also of interest is the Spanish language biography of Amparo Poch y Gascón, an anarchist and feminist doctor who worked with Professor Brocca. She was co-founder of the famous Mujeres Libres organisation and sometime member of the Republican government:

- Rodrigo, Antonina (2002) Una Mujer Libre: Amparo Poch y Gascón: Médica Anarquista (A Free Woman - Amparo Poch y Gascón : Anarchist Doctor), Barcelona, Flor del Viento Ediciones (see, in particular, pages 78, 79, and 105).

This book contains a reproduction of an advertisement from the journal Solidaridad Obrera (17 July 1936) for a 'grand international meeting against war' on 18 July at the Plaza Monumental (bull ring), Barcelona, organised by Las Juventudes Libertarias (The Libertarian Youth). The speakers were to be: Fidel Miro, for Libertarian Youth; Max Muller, for the Swedish Young Anarcho-Syndicalists; Professor Brocca, for the War Resisters' International; Dra. Amparo Poch, for the War Resisters' Feminine Section; Hem Day, for the International Committee for Anarchist Defence; Dr. Félix Martí Ibáñez, for the Practical Idealists; Manuel Perez, for the Anarchists of Barcelona; Augustin Souchy, for the International Anti-Militarist Bureau, and Federica Montseny for the CNT. Cuartillas (notes) were to be read from: Diego Abad de Santillán, Georges Pioch and Bart de Ligt, with Delso de Miguel presiding, for the Libertarian Youth.

In the 1937 pamphlet by Runham Brown (see reference above), it is mentioned that this peace rally was cancelled because Franco flew to the mainland from Canarias on the very day of the proposed rally, and the Spanish Civil War began.

=== Articles and external links ===
- Article by Xabi Agirre in Peace News (April 1996)
- Article in Green Peace News (May 1996)
- Article by Xabi Agirre in Peace News (Aug./Sept. 1996)
- Article from The Wise Elephant (La Elefanta Sabia)
- Article in German
- Movimiento de Objección de Conciencía (2002) 'En Legítima Desobedencia: Tres Decadas de Objección, Insumisión y Antimilitarismo'
- El Mundo, article in Spanish mentioning Brocca's work, by the prominent British historian and Hispanic specialist Professor Henry Kamen
- Article in German, quoting Jose Brocca
- Bart de Ligt: El Gran Olvidado (Bart de Ligt: The Great Forgotten One); article (in Spanish) by Cthuchi Zamarra, mentioning, in passing, Jose Brocca's work in Spain.
- Un Brigadista de Paz (A Brigader of Peace); Article by Andres Bedia.
- WRI archives at the International Institute of Social History, Amsterdam
- Papers of John Nevin Sayre, held in the Swarthmore College Peace Collection, Pennsylvania; Series B, Box 42, Spain
- Academic paper by Scott H. Bennett, presented to the International Conference on the Spanish Civil War, Madrid 2006 (in Spanish)
- Fernanda Romeu Alfaro, Memoria en sombra: los pacifistas en la guerra civil Espanola, El Viejo Topo n 287, Dec. 2011
- Housman's Bookshop, Caledonian Road, London
- War Resisters' International
- Spanish language article on Wikipedia.Es
