= Amparo Ballivián =

Bolivian economist

María Amparo Ballivián Valdés
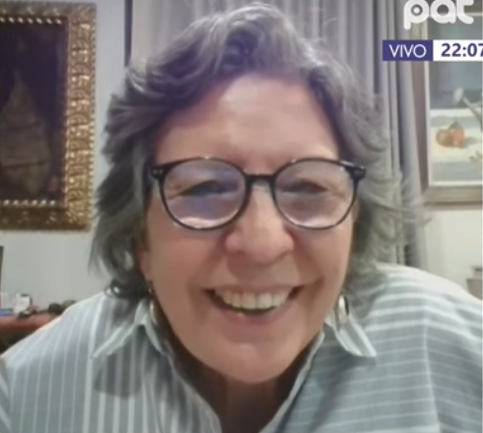
- In a 2025 interview
- Born: 1960 (age 65–66); La Paz, Bolivia
- Education: Rice University
- Spouse: Miguel Zalles Denegri
- Parent: Amparo Valdés Hertzog y Félix Ballivián Calderón

María Amparo Ballivián Valdés (born 1960) is a Bolivian economist. She has served as Minister of Housing and Basic Services, Vice Minister of Investment and Privatization and President of the National Customs of Bolivia. In February 2024, she presented herself as a pre-candidate for the Unity Bloc for the 2025 Bolivian general election.

== Biography ==
María Amparo Ballivián Valdés was born in La Paz, Bolivia in 1960. She was born into a family that belonged to the elite of the city of La Paz since the late 18th century. Through her father she is descended from the Spanish colonel Jorge Ballivián and from Governor Sebastián de Segurola, who became famous by fighting against the indigenous uprising of Túpac Katari. Therefore, she is related to former Bolivian presidents José Ballivián, Adolfo Ballivián and Hugo Ballivián. Through her maternal side, she also happens to be a great-niece of another former president, Enrique Hertzog.

She studied at Rice University in Houston, US, where she earned a doctorate in econometrics, and a master's degree in mathematical economics. She was appointed Minister of Housing and Basic Services on August 4, 1998, during the second government of Hugo Banzer. Then, on August 3, 1999, she was appointed president of the National Customs of Bolivia. She worked at the World Bank Group, from where she retired in 2017.

== See also ==
- Hugo Banzer
