= Pacifism in Spain =

In the 1930s Spain became a focus for pacifist organisations including the Fellowship of Reconciliation and the War Resisters' International whose president was the British MP and Labour Party leader George Lansbury. Prominent Spanish pacifists such as Amparo Poch y Gascón and José Brocca supported the Republicans in the Spanish Civil War. Brocca argued that Spanish pacifists had no alternative but to make a stand against what he viewed as fascism. He put this stand into practice by various means including organising agricultural workers to maintain food supplies and through humanitarian work with war refugees.

Pacifism was proscribed in Francoist Spain, and several Spanish pacifists, such as the Tolstoyan Esteban Pallarols (1900–1946), were executed by the regime.

== See also ==
- Insubordinate movement in Spain
