= Sebastián de Segurola =

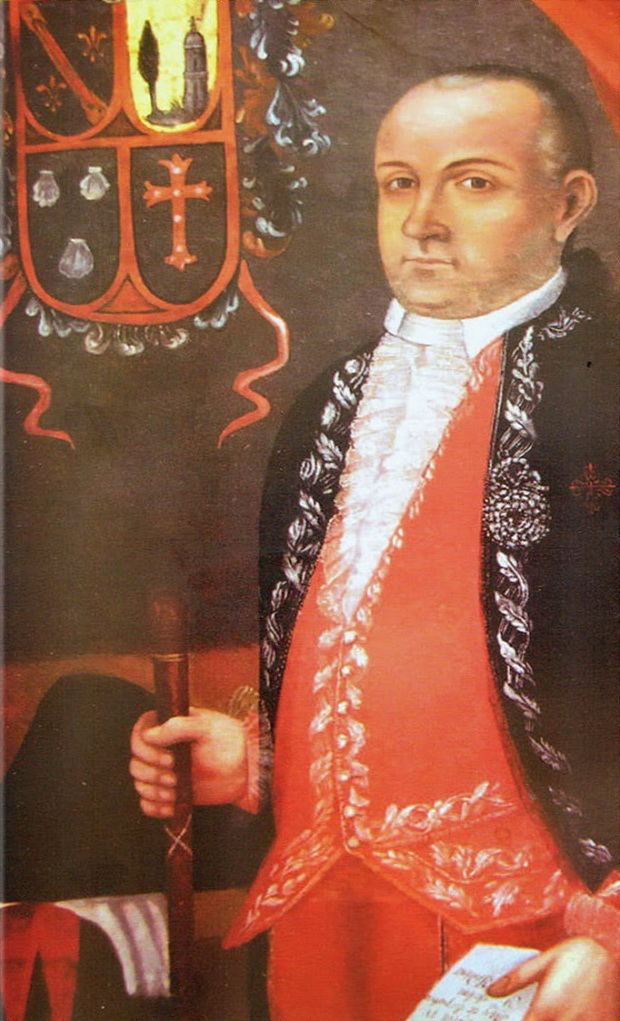
Sebastián de Segurola y Oliden. Oil painting by an anonymous artist, preserved in the La Paz Museum, Bolivia.

Sebastián de Segurola y Olidén (Azpeitia, province of Guipúzcoa, Spain,27 January, 1740 – La Paz, Audiencia de Charcas, 1 October, 1789) was a nobleman from the Basque Country, and a Knight of the Order of Calatrava.

Sebastián de Segurola was missioned in Upper Peru since 1777, and reached the rank of brigadier. He was a military man who held important political positions and participated in the repression of indigenous rebellions of the end of the 18th century. He was named interim viceroy of Buenos Aires, a few days before his death. His grandson was Marshal José Ballivián Segurola, who became President of Bolivia from 1841 to 1847.

== Biography ==
Sebastian de Segurola Zelayaran y Oliden Egaña, was born in Azpeitia, province of Guipuzcoa, Spain, on 27 January, 1740, son of Maria Clara de Oliden and Egaña and Rafael Ygnacio de Segurola and Çelayaran.

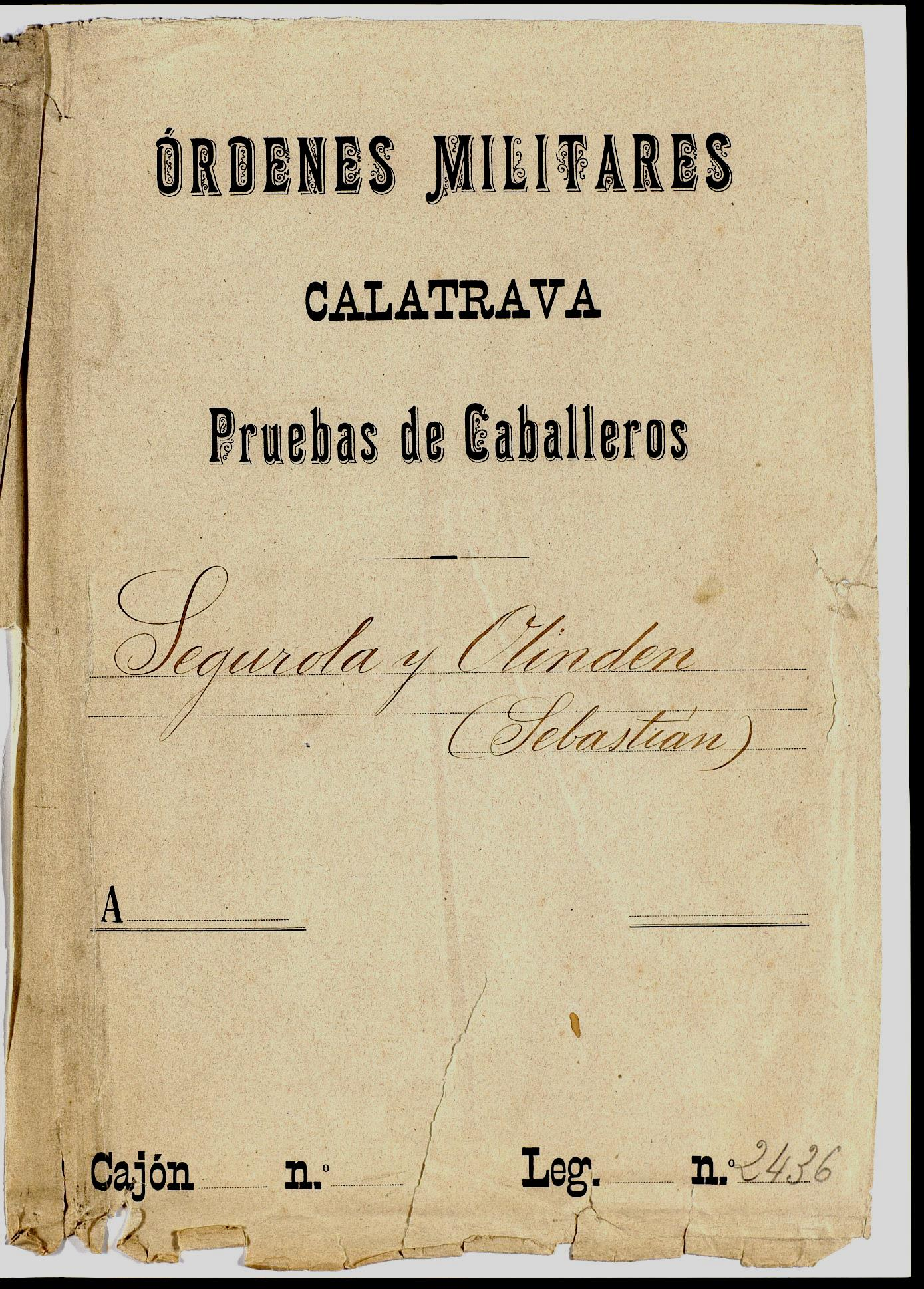
File cover of Sebastián de Segurola y Oliden to cross into the Order of Calatrava.

=== Military Commander of La Paz ===
He was appointed mayor of Larecaja, replacing the Count of the Oselle Valley, on November 19, 1776. (General Archive of Simancas. Dir.Tes. Inv. 2 Leg.60-7 Appointment of mayor of Larecaja).

=== Brigadier ===
In 1788 he obtained the rank of brigadier, retaining the governorship of La Paz.

=== Interim Viceroy ===
By Royal Decree dated in Madrid on September 26, 1789, His Majesty the King appointed as interim 1st Joaquín del Pino; 2nd Antonio de Olaguer Feliú and 3rd Sebastián de Segurola to occupy the viceroyalty of Buenos Aires in the event of the absence or death of Nicolás Antonio de Arredondo, viceroy of Buenos Aires.
