= Amparo Garcia-Crow =

American writer, director and actress

Amparo Garcia-Crow is an American writer, director and actress, based in Austin, Texas. Garcia-Crow identifies herself as an "inter-disciplinary artist who acts, directs, sings, writes plays, screenplays and songs" as well as a film artist, with a "strong focus...for the last few years...in storytelling and the development of solo work" as she currently directs performance artists and storytellers.

== Career ==
Amparo Garcia-Crow has been a Master Acting Teacher for MFA Acting Program at University of Texas in Austin, and is currently an Assistant Professor of Drama at Austin Community College. She is the founder and current host of THE LIVING ROOM: Storytime for Grownups in Austin, Texas. She developed as a playwright at South Coast Repertory Theatre and Mabou Mines, and has world premieres Off-Broadway, Actor's Theatre of Louisville, Latino Chicago, and at various Southwest theaters and universities.

Garcia-Crow was in residence with NYC's Mabou Mines, creating and developing a musical, Strip. She is also working on the screenplays, Appeal and Unknown Soldier: The New American Musical of Mexican Descent with i25 Productions in Los Angeles. Some of her recent self-written-and-produced plays include, Death Rattle, Loves and Fishes, and Territories.

=== THE LIVING ROOM: Storytime for Grownups ===
The Living Room was initially conceived as a fundraiser for her monthly trips to New York City, as an artist-in-residence with Mabou Mines theater company.

Garcia-Crow found inspiration for THE LIVING ROOM: Storytime for Grownups in her own experience working with the original show, In The West, which featured “monologues written and performed by the members” of the independent Big State Productions and ran for six years from 1985 to 1991.

Starting in 2010, Garcia-Crow developed the “monthly storytelling series” THE LIVING ROOM: Storytime for Grownups. Garcia-Crow created this series as a "renaissance" of her own "artistic development ... of the deep exploration ... about the power of story at its most stripped down and most human interactive possibility", with the heart of the production to be "about brave living and the hero’s journey for living". The performance consists of three men and three women, for a total of six storytellers, with Garcia-Crow performing her own piece last.

== Works ==
Garcia-Crow's collection of works titled Between Misery and the Sun: The South Texas Plays is published by No Passport Press.

The book is described as: "Four plays by US Chicana dramatist Amparo Garcia-Crow that chart the violent, beautiful, hard-bitten lives of characters in South Texas. Cross-cultural collisions abound in the spirited geographies of her incandescent prose for the stage. With preface by acclaimed dramatist Octavio Solis and introduction by scholar Jose Limon of the University of Texas-Austin, this quartet of plays is a vital addition to published works of Chicana literature."

Plays included in the book:

- Cocks Have Claws and Wings to Fly
- Under a Western Sky
- The Faraway Nearby
- Esmeralda Blue

Her musical play, "The Unknown Soldier" about the tragic life of Gus Garcia, a lawyer who worked on civil rights for Latinos is one of the few plays to depict the life of a lawyer. The play was one of two finalists representing the National Association of Latino Independent Producers in ABC and Walt Disney Studio's Talent Development Scholarship Grant Program.

Garcia-Crow's short film, Loaves and Fishes was made with cinematographer, Nancy Schiesari in 2001. The film tells the story of a single mother and a family's prejudice against Latino day laborers. Loaves and Fishes, which is about a half-hour long, was shown on the PBS series, Territories.

== Acclaim ==
Garcia-Crow has had her works premiered at Los Angeles Latino International Film Festival, Cine las Americas, SXSW Film Festival, and on the television network, PBS.

Garcia-Crow received the Larry King Playwriting Award for her play, Cocks Have Claws and Wings to Fly, as well as the "Best Female Protagonist” award at the Mae West Festival: for her play, Blue: La Mujer Moderna.

Garica-Crow has been part of the NEA/TCG Director's Fellowship and she was a James Michener Fellow.

== Acting ==
Garcia-Crow has performed at the Kennedy Center as well as regional theaters in the Southwest. Her more recent films include Love in the Sixties (2014), in which she served as writer, director, producer, and actress. She appeared in the film Straight A's (2013).

Along with having roles in independent films, commercials, and industrials, Garcia-Crow also had a reoccurring role as "Mrs. Hernandez" on the PBS children's show, Wishbone.
