= Amparo Alvajar =

Spanish journalist and dramatist (1916–1998)

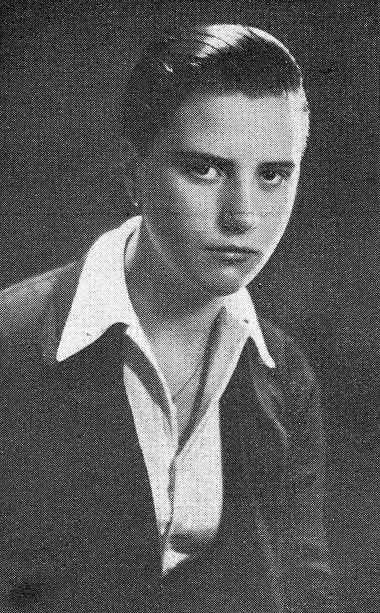
Amparo Alvajar (1932)

María del Amparo Alvajar López Jean, most commonly known as Amparo Alvajar, (August 11, 1916 – May 1998) was a Spanish journalist, dramatist, and writer from Galicia, as well as a translator for international organizations.

Amparo Alvajar was born in A Coruña on August 11, 1916. She was the daughter of Republican politician César Alvajar and Amparo López Jean. Her siblings included Ana María Alvajar L. Jean, María Teresa Alvajar López, and Javier Alvajar López. She excelled in musical and intellectual pursuits from a young age. She studied commerce in A Coruña.

In the Second Republic, she worked in the city of A Coruña and was secretary of Casares Quiroga. With the victory of the Popular Front, she relocated to Madrid to work for the Secret Services of the Ministry of the Interior which was under the direction os Casares Quiroga. After the revolt of July 18, 1936, she moved to Valencia where she married Arturo Cuadrado. Later, she moved with the government to Barcelona where her only daughter, Silvia, was born. She went into exile in France, then traveling from Bordeaux to Buenos Aires. Amparo lived in Argentina in 1955, where she published articles and essays on the theater and Galicia, as well as working on Spanish translations. She also published the dramatic comedies Amada y Tu and Un balcón para los Lester. She later married an Argentine lawyer with whom she moved to Mexico. Years later, she moved to New York City, working as a translator at the United Nations. Afterwards, she relocated to Paris, where she worked as a translator for Correo da UNESCO. In 1961, she was the director of the translation team at the International Labour Organization in Geneva, and was also a translator in the Disarmament Committee, the Atomic Energy Organization and during the conference on European security. She retired in Monção where she died in May 1998.

== Work ==
In Buenos Aires, she performed in two plays, El Balcon de los Lester (The Balcony of the Lesters) and Amada y tú (Amada and you) which she wrote in Spanish in collaboration with Agustín Caballero. Amada y tú consists of three acts that take place in an old house where three men fall in love with the ghost of a teenager.

In Geneva, she directed plays including El mejor alcalde, el Rey (The Best Mayor, The King) by Lope de Vega, Las cartas boca abajo (Cards Face Down) by Antonio Buero Vallejo, and El sí de las niñas (The Maidens' Consent) by Leandro Fernández de Moratín.

== Acknowledgments ==
In 1961, Alvajar was named Knight of the Order of the Spanish Republic, which is why he was called "Knight".
