= Amparo do Serra =

Brazilian city in the state of Minas Gerais

Coordinates: 20°30′25″S 42°48′10″W

- Municipality
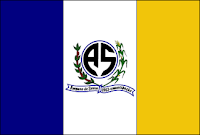
- Flag Coat of arms
- Interactive map of Amparo do Serra
- Country: Brazil
- State: Minas Gerais
- Region: Southeast
- Time zone: UTC−3 (BRT)

Location of Amparo do Serra within Minas Gerais

Amparo da Serra (formerly called Amparo do Serra) is a Brazilian municipality in the state of Minas Gerais. As of 2020 its population is estimated to be 4,678.

== See also ==
- List of municipalities in Minas Gerais
