= Amparo High School =

Location
- 95 Marang Street; Amparo Subd. Caloocan; Philippines; 14°45′6″N 121°4′19″E

Information
- Type: Public
- Established: 1979
- Authority: Schools Division Office of Caloocan City
- Principal: Amorzosimo V. Cortez
- Grades: 7 to 12
- Enrollment: 2636 (2004–05)
- Website: Official site

Amparo High School (AHS) is a public secondary school located in Caloocan, Philippines. The school operates under the Schools Division Office of Caloocan City.

Amparo High School was established in 1979. An annex was constructed in 2005 and opened in 2008, which later became an independent school named Horacio de la Costa High School.
