= Amparo Rubiales =

Spanish politician

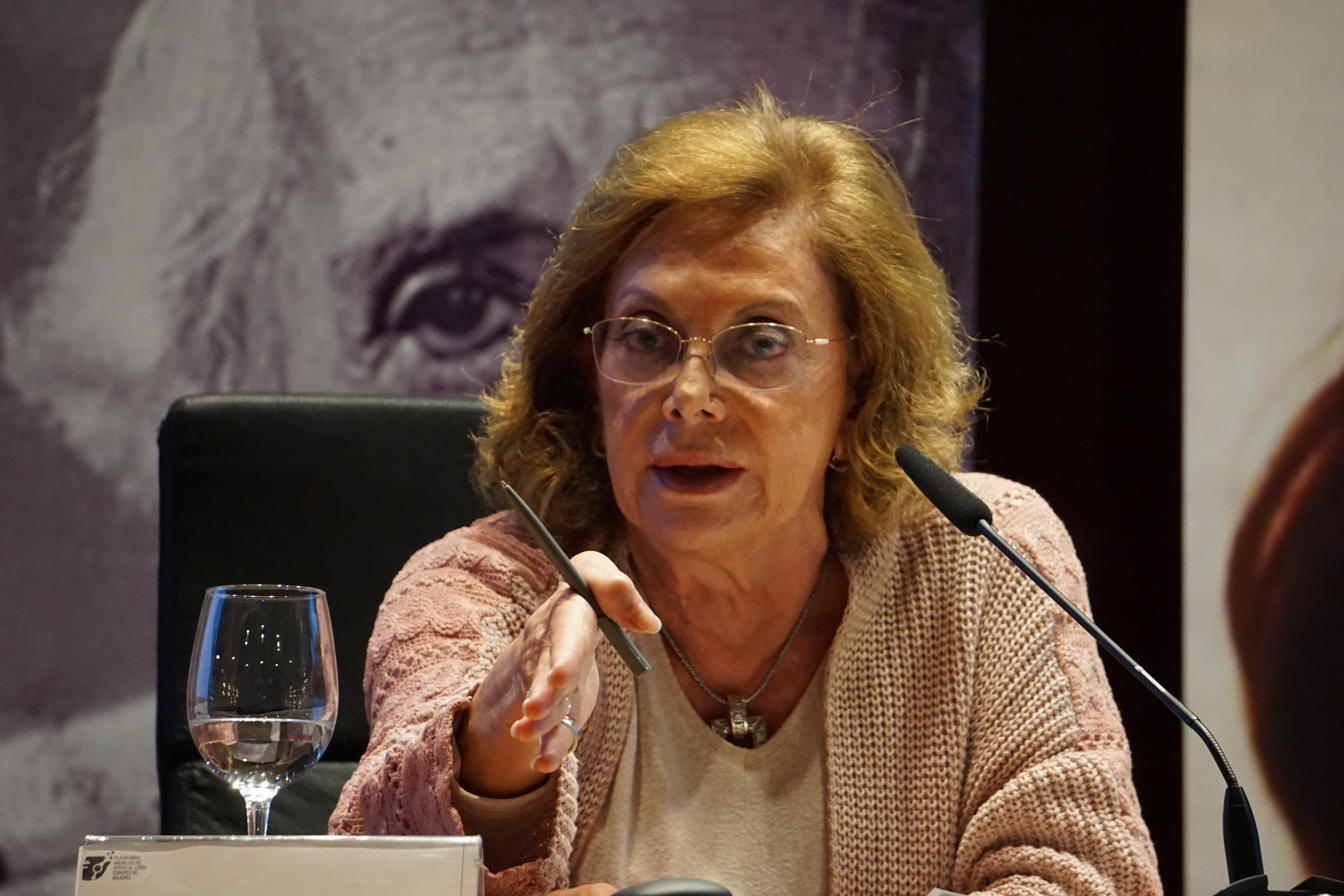
Amparo Rubiales Feminario 2017

Amparo Rubiales Torrejón (Madrid, 20 October 1945) is a Spanish politician who belongs to the political party PSOE and is ex-counsellor of the Junta de Andalucía. She holds a PhD in Law, and is a lawyer and Senior Lecturer of Administrative Law at the University of Seville.

== Political Career and Activism ==
As a young woman, Rubiales was involved in a political activist work against Franco's dictatorship. After that, she started a political career which lasted thirty years and finished in 2004.

Rubiales belonged to the Communist Party from 1975 until 1982, and was a councilor in the council of Seville and vice-president of the Provincial Deputation of Seville from 1979 to 1981. In 1982 she joined the PSOE and was a member of the Parliament of Andalusia from 1982 to 1986.

Throughout her thirty-year career in politics, Rubiales has worked as a councilor, vice-president of the council, vice-president of the Congress, senator and deputy, and she was the first female member of the Andalusian Government and the first woman to work as a deputy of the central government. As of April 2017, she was still a member of the Council of State and a feminist activist for PSOE. Its mission is to promote equality between men and women.

In 2015, the Minister of Economy and Knowledge proposed to the Governing Council to approve the nomination of the presidents of the Universities' Social Councils. That gave Amparo Rubiales Torrejón the opportunity to preside the organ of Pablo de Olavide University as the principal responsible of the Social Council. The following year, and still working in the Social Council, La Asociación de Mujeres Investigadoras y Tecnólogas awarded Rubiales for her contributions to promote the position and visibility of women in science and technology.

== Personal life ==
In 1971, she married Manuel Ramón Alarcón. The couple had two children, Ramón and Clara. The marriage broke up in 1981.

== Politics ==
Amparo was the first female member working in the Andalusian Government as the councilor of Presidency in the first Andalusian Government (1982-1984). She was named to take part in the Spanish Senate on 22 June 1986, when she belonged the Socialist Parliamentary Group. She was in the organs of the Permanent Deputation, as a deputy (from 15 June 1986 to 20 November 1989) and four times as a spokesperson in committees: in the Committee of Autonomies, Organization and Territorial Administration (from 16 September 1986 to 2 September 1989), the Justice Committee (from 17 September 1986 to 2 September 1989), the Committee of the Government Presidency and the Interior (from 17 September 1986 to 30 September 1989) and in the monitoring committee of the Interterritorial Compensation Fund (from 17 September 1986 to 2 September 1989). In 1991, Rubiales came back to Seville as a councilor and a spokesperson of the Socialist Municipal Group. She was National deputy in 1993 and between 1996 and 2000, Civil governor of Seville and delegate of the Andalusian Government between 1993 and 1996 assuming the Deputy Secretary-General of the Socialist Parliamentary Group. Between 2000 and 2004, Amparo was the second vice-president of the Congress of Deputies. She was a member of the Advisory Council of Andalusia (2005-2008) and also an elective State Councilor from 2008 to 2012. In addition, she was a member of the World Interparliamentary Union and the president of the Parliamentary Friendship Group with Italy, Greece and Argentina.

== Controversies ==
In July 2012 she was appointed president for the PSOE-A, a position from which she resigned on June 8, 2023, after calling the general coordinator of the Popular Party Elías Bendodo a "Nazi Jew". She admitted she used someone's religion, origin, or ethnicity for political criticism. No other politician was identified with his origin or religion.

== Works ==
Title	Editorial	Publication date	No.. of Pages
Una mujer de mujeres	Aguilar	1-09-2008	200
La región: historia y actualidad	Universidad de Sevilla. Secretario de Publicaciones	1-02-1973	430
Mujeres, derecho y sociedad	Fundación El Monte (Seville)	10-01-1996	344

== Conferences ==
'La mujer frente al derecho' took place in Seville on 8 February 1968.

'La conquista de los derechos de las mujeres' at Centro de la Información a la Mujer in San Roque on 6 March 2014.

'Del derecho al voto a la democracia paritaria 'as president of the Clara Campoamor forum at Casa de la Provincia, Seville, on 4 April 2006.

'Saber pactar': the possible coalitions at the Faculty of Law at the University of Sevilla on 4 February 2016.
