= Amparo Acker-Palmer =

Molecular biologist from Spain

- Born: 10 September 1968 (age 58); Sueca, Spain
- Education: University of Valencia
- Occupations: scientist; cell biologist; neuroscientist
- Employer: Goethe University Frankfurt Rhine-Main Neuroscience Network
- Spouse: Till Acker
- Children: 2
- Awards: The Paul Ehrlich and Ludwig Darmstaedter Prize (2010)

Amparo Acker-Palmer (born 10 September 1968) is a German-based Spanish cell biologist and neuroscientist. Her research focuses on the similarities of the mechanism of nerve and blood vessel development. She has worked alongside her husband, Till Acker, who is a neurobiologist, in researching tumor therapies. In her career, she has won several awards, including the Paul Ehrlich & Ludwig Darmstaeder Prize for Young Researchers in 2010. In 2012, Amparo Acker-Palmer was elected as member of the German Academy of Sciences Leopoldina.

== Education and career ==
Originally from Sueca, Valencia, Spain, Acker-Palmer obtained a B.A. in biology and biochemistry in the University of Valencia in 1991. After graduating, she completed a postdoctoral fellowship at the European Molecular Biology Laboratory (EMBL) in Heidelberg, Germany in 1996 after obtaining a PhD in biology in the University of Valencia in the same year.

In 2001, she moved to Martinsried to take the position as a junior group leader at the Max Planck Institute for Neurobiology for six years. At Goethe University, she was nominated as Professor of Cluster of Excellence "Macromolecular Complexes" in 2007.

In 2011, she became the head of the Department of Molecular and Cellular Neurobiology at Goethe University, while working on research in a specialized program known as the Focus Program Translational Neurosciences (FTN). During this time she was a faculty member at the Johannes Gutenberg–University Mainz through her GFK Fellowship. In 2014, she was then elected as a Max Planck Fellow at the Max Planck Institute for Brain Research, where she conducted research focused on the mechanics of nerve and blood vessel communication.

== Research ==
Acker-Palmer's work focused on the mechanism of the development of nerve and blood vessel at the molecular level. Alongside her colleagues, she published her work in Nature in 2010, as "EphrinB2 regulates VEGFR2 function in developmental and tumour angiogenesis". She won the Paul Ehrlich & Ludwig Darmstaeder Prize for Young Researchers for discovering the similarities between nerve and blood vessel development.

Ephrin is one of the axon's guiding molecules during the development of the central nervous system. Her research examines the role of one of Ephrin's receptor's transmembrane ligand, Ephrin-B2 in particular, in developmental angiogenesis. However, the validity of the study's data was placed under scrutiny by Nature's readership due to its questionable figures.

To clarify the situation, a letter along with supplementary information was issued by the authors explaining the errors made. According to Nature, although several images were incorrectly labelled, the errors have no effect on the experiment's original conclusion. The authors have also conducted another experiment for further verification, which confirmed their results.

== Honours and awards ==
- Received a Doctoral Fellowship from the Spanish Government (1992–1996)
- Received a Doctoral Extraordinary Award from the University of Valencia, Spain (1997)
- Elected as the EU Fellow in the "Training and Mobility of Researchers Programme" (1997–1999)
- Won €60,000 from the Paul Ehrlich & Ludwig Darmstaeder Prize for Young Researchers for her research in discovering the similarities between nerve and blood vessel development (2010)
- Received the Gutenberg Research Fellowship Award (2012)
- Elected as a Max Planck Fellow at the MPI for Brain Research (2014)
- Received a €2.5 million award from the European Research Council (ERC) (2015)

== Selected publications ==
- Senturk, A; Pfennig, S .; Weiss, A .; Burk, K. (2011). "EphrinBs are functional co-receptors for Reelin to regulate neuronal migration." Nature (in English) (Band 472): 356–360. doi:10.1038/nature09874.
- Sawamiphak, S .; Seidel, S .; Essmann, CL; Wilkinson, G .; Pitulescu, ME; Acker, T. (2010). 'EphrinB2 regulates VEGFR2 function in developmental and tumor angiogenesis'. Nature (in English) (Band 465): 487–491. doi: 10.1038/nature08995.
- Sawamiphak, S .; Ritter, M. (2008). "Preparation of retinal cultures to study ex vivo tip endothelial cell responses". Nature Protocols ( Band 5 edition): 1659–1665. doi:10.1038/nprot.2010.130.
- Essmann, CL; Martinez, E .; Geiger, J .; Zimmer, M .; Traut, M .; Stein, V .; Klein, R. (2008). 'Serine phosphorylation of ephrinB2 regulates trafficking of synaptic AMPA receptors'. Nature Neuroscience ( Band 11): 105–1043. doi:10.1038/nn.2171.
- Segura, I .; Essmann, CL; Weinges, S. (2007). "Grb4 and GIT1 transduce ephrinB reverse signals modulating spine morphogenesis and synapse formation". Nature Neuroscience ( Band 10): 301–310. doi:10.1038/nn1858.

== See also ==
- List of Spanish inventors and discoverers
