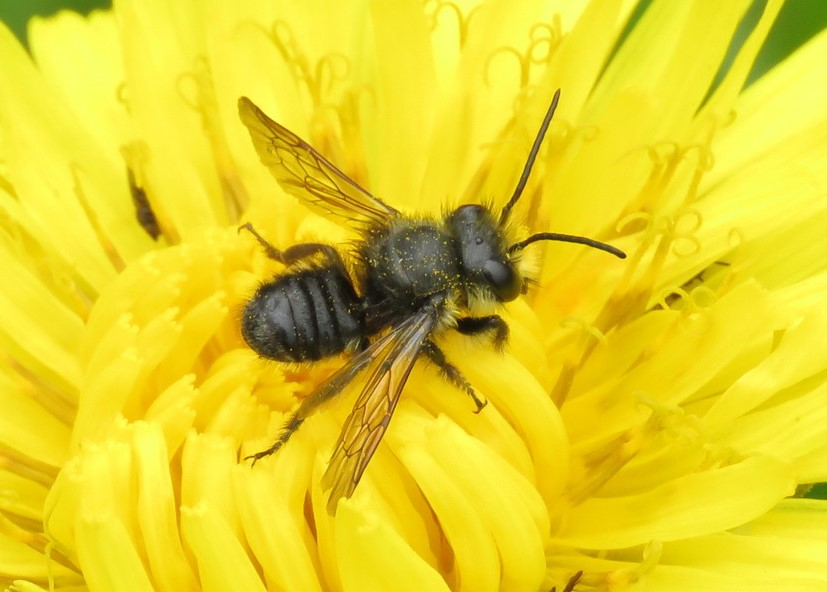

Scientific classification
- Kingdom: Animalia
- Phylum: Arthropoda
- Class: Insecta
- Order: Hymenoptera
- Family: Megachilidae
- Genus: Megachile
- Species: M. amparo

Binomial name
- Megachile amparo Gonzalez, 2006

= Megachile amparo =

Species of leafcutter bee (Megachile)

Megachile amparo is a species of bee in the family Megachilidae. It was described by Gonzalez in 2006.
