= Amparo Cuevas =

Luz Amparo Cuevas Arteseros (13 March 1931 - 17 August 2012) was a Spanish Roman Catholic seer. She claimed that the Virgin of the Sorrows appeared to her in Prado Nuevo estate in the Madrilenian municipality of El Escorial on 14 June 1981. Following these statements arose a religious movement that has mobilized thousands of people who go to the place of Marian apparitions. She was called "El Escorial seer" referring to the village where Amparo claimed to have seen the apparitions.

These apparitions have not yet been recognized by the Catholic Church and have created controversy that has reached the courts. All that after 1981 came around these events has been described by some people as «business and destructive sect».

== Biography ==
Luz Amparo Cuevas Arteseros was born in a poor family on 13 March 1931 in the hamlet Pesebre of Albaceteño municipality of Peñascosa, Castile-La Mancha, Spain. Her parents were María Dolores Arteseros and Jacinto Cuevas Ruiz. She married Nicasio Barderas Bravo and had seven children.

She was a humble and non-student woman but a good communicator. On June 14, 1981, she stated that on the Prado Nuevo estate, from the Madrilenian municipality of El Escorial, the Virgin of Sorrows had appeared to her on an ash, saying she was "the instrument chosen by the Lord and the Virgin to communicate their messages". Since November 1980 had some previous manifestations.

The fact of the appearance of the Virgin, which would be repeated several times until 2002, attracted thousands of people from different parts of Spain and countries like Portugal, France, Argentina, Mexico and Italy.

Amparo Cuevas put voice messages which claims received by the Virgin. These speeches were recorded and reproduced by loudspeakers.

The 1985, the then Archbishop of Madrid, Angel Suquía, following due process, decided not to endorse the nature of the supposed supernatural apparitions and revelations in Prado Nuevo. In April 2012 Archbishop of Madrid Antonio María Rouco Varela authorized to celebrate Easter Triduum at the site of the apparitions and the construction of a chapel, while always keeping the resolution of its predecessor. This chapel was built after April 2012, the Archbishop of Madrid, Cardinal Rouco Varela, give approval and the council in June, permit for construction.

Beside the number of devotees also came a movement of family and ex-devotees who accused Luz Amparo Cuevas and the organization that had formed around her to be a destructive sect and physical and psychological abuses.

On May 26, 1983, she suffered an attack by three unknown men.

On Friday, August 17, 2012, Luz Amparo Cuevas Arteseros died at her home in El Escorial, after a long illness. Her funeral opened the chapel dedicated to the Mother of God that was raised on the site of the apparition, chapel which was one of the requests which the Virgin performed "for the measurement of the Passion of her Son" and where she was buried.

== The apparitions ==
Although in October 1980 Luz Amparo Cuevas had already a strange experience, on June 14, 1981, said she saw the Virgin of Sorrows on an ash on the estate "Prado Nuevo." Virgin gives her the following message:

Soy la Virgen Dolorosa. Quiero que se construya en este lugar una capilla en honor a mi nombre; que se venga a meditar de cualquier parte del mundo la pasión de mi Hijo, que está muy olvidada. Si hacen lo que yo digo, el agua de esta fuente curará. Todo el que venga a rezar aquí diariamente el Santo Rosario será bendecido por mí. Muchos serán marcados con una cruz en la frente. Haced penitencia. Haced oración. I am the Virgin of Sorrows. I want it built here a chapel in honor of my name that comes to meditate anywhere in the world the passion of my Son, who is largely forgotten. If you do what I say, water from this source will heal. Everyone who comes here to pray the Rosary daily will be blessed by me. Many will be marked with a cross on the forehead. Do penance. Make prayer.

On 24 June 1983 the Virgin reappears and asks to establish "houses of love and mercy to the poors.".

The Virgin appears giving different messages repeatedly, and appears on 18 September 1983, 25 and 31 May 1984. According itself Amparo get to see the Virgin to 376 times.

At the beginning of the 1990s, the then mayor of El Escorial, the socialist Mariano Rodríguez, the rector, Pablo Camacho Becerra, and the administrator of the estate Prado Nuevo, Tomas Leyún, tried to end the movement closing with support of the City Council, the estate. On 15 September 1995 Prado Nuevo reopens, losing Spanish Socialist Workers' Party the mayoralty. The Rector, Don Pablo Camacho Becerra, never mobilized either for or against, following the instructions of Cardinal Archbishop of Madrid-Alcalá, Vicente Enrique Tarancón, who ordered him to ignore phenomena.

== The work ==
Around the Marian apparitions in Prado Nuevo, a network of foundations and religious institutions is created and developed. This is known as "the Work of the Mother of God of El Escorial."

In 1994 is created the "Foundation Pia Independent Lady of Sorrows" and "Public Association of Faithful and Repairers of Our Lady the Virgin of Sorrows." The "Public Association of Faithful and Repairers of Our Lady the Virgin of Sorrows" has over 132 properties.

Directly related to Prado Nuevo three priests were ordained in 2000 and then four more. Also over 80 novices are kept.

== See also ==
- Our Lady of Sorrows
- Marian apparition
