= Hugo Ballivián =

President of Bolivia from 1951 to 1952

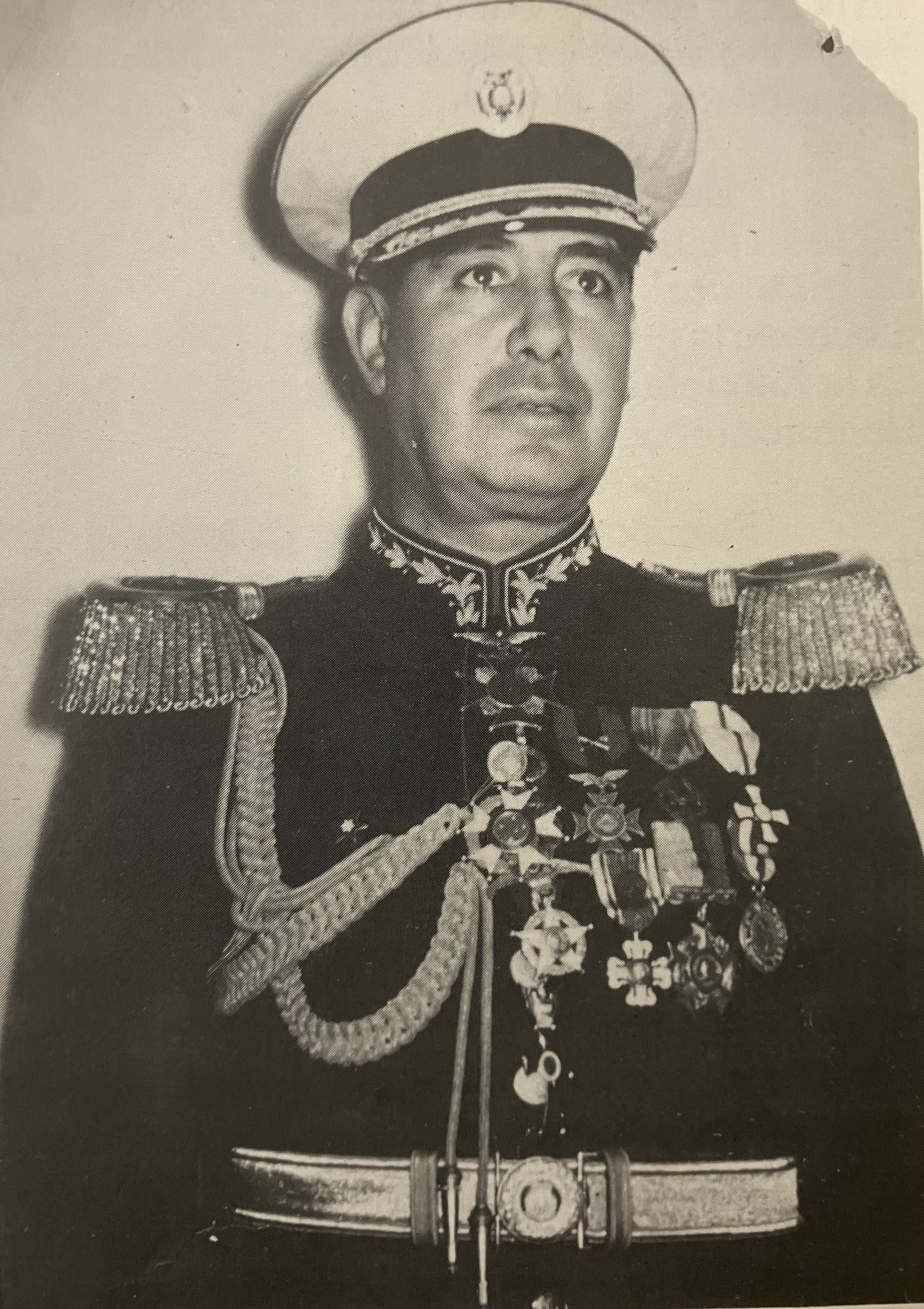

44th President of Bolivia
- De facto
- In office 16 May 1951 – 11 April 1952
- Vice President: Vacant
- Preceded by: Mamerto Urriolagoitía
- Succeeded by: Hernán Siles Zuazo (interim)

Personal details
- Born: Hugo Ballivián Rojas; 7 June 1901 La Paz, Bolivia
- Died: 15 July 1993 (aged 92) La Paz, Bolivia
- Spouse: Maria Hortensia Oropeza
- Parent(s): José Ballivián Yanguas; Concepción Rojas
- Education: Military College of the Army

Military service
- Allegiance: Bolivia
- Branch/service: Bolivian Army
- Rank: General
- Battles/wars: Chaco War

Hugo Ballivián Rojas (7 June 1901 – 15 July 1993) was a Bolivian politician and military officer who served as the de facto 44th president of Bolivia from 1951 to 1952. A career military officer, he was Commander of the Bolivian Armed Forces when President Mamerto Urriolagoitía called upon him to take over as extra-Constitutional chief executive to prevent the swearing-in of the reform-minded President-elect, Víctor Paz Estenssoro. This was a self-coup that became popularly known as the Mamertazo. Installing himself in the Palacio Quemado, Ballivián was the oligarchy's last hope to "turn back the hands of the clock," but the situation was apparently beyond repair. Despite declaring a nationwide curfew and exiling and imprisoning some opposition leaders, the demonstrations, work stoppages, and uprisings continued.

Matters came to a head when Ballivián's Minister of Government, General Antonio Seleme, secretly pledged his support to the plotters, then led by Hernán Siles Zuazo (since Paz Estenssoro was at the time exiled in Argentina). This catalyzed the events of April 9–11, 1952, that have come to be known as the Bolivian National Revolution, or the 1952 Revolution. They mark an important watershed in the history of Bolivia, routing the supporters of Ballivián, which included large sectors of the Bolivian armed forces. Defections to the rebel camp tilted the scales, and following various days of violent armed confrontation the President sought asylum in the Chilean Embassy. Thus at long last expired the last government of the 1880-1952 period.

Vilified by many as the last leader of the Old Regime, and seen in more benign terms by others as a general doing his duty as he was entrusted to at an extremely difficult time in Bolivian history, Hugo Ballivián Rojas died in 1993, long retired from any political activity. He was 92 years old.

== Sources ==
- Mesa José de; Gisbert, Teresa; and Carlos D. Mesa, Historia de Bolivia, 3rd edition., pp. 584–587.

Political offices
Preceded by Mamerto Urriolagoitía	President of Bolivia; 1951–1952	Succeeded by Hernán Siles Zuazo; Interim
