= Amparo Poch y Gascón =

Spanish anarchist, pacifist, doctor, and activist (1902–1968)

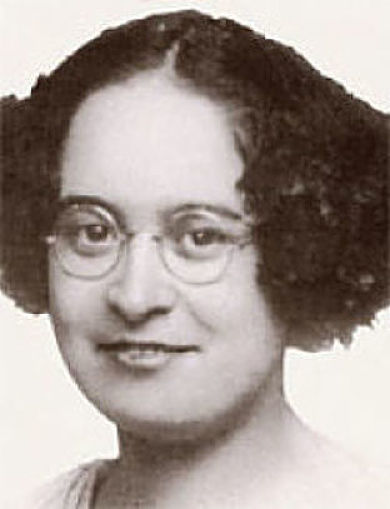
- Born: 15 October 1902; Zaragoza, Spain
- Died: 15 April 1968 (aged 65); Toulouse, France
- Occupations: Doctor, activist, journalist,

Amparo Poch y Gascón (15 October 1902 – 15 April 1968) was a Spanish anarchist, pacifist, doctor, and activist in the years leading up to and during the Spanish Civil War. Poch y Gascón was born in Zaragoza.

She was one of the founding members of the Mujeres Libres and was appointed director of social assistance at the Ministry of Health and Social Assistance by Federica Montseny.

She was responsible for organizing the Mujeres Libres in Barcelona and used her government position to promote the establishment of liberatorios de prostitución (liberation homes for prostitutes, where prostitutes could receive health care, psychotherapy and professional training to enable them to acquire economic independence through socially acceptable means).

She worked to promote awareness about women's sexuality and advocated for sexual freedom and against monogamy and the sexual double standard. Unlike her co-founders in the Mujeres Libres, Lucía Sánchez Saornil and Mercedes Comaposada, she had been a member of the reformist treintista CNT before the war. She held a more essentialist view of women's nature, appealing to women as mothers and embracing motherhood as a natural, feminine state. She wrote extensively on the topic of motherhood, promoting an anarchist approach to child rearing.

Dra. Amparo Poch is also a name well known in pacifist circles. Poch y Gascón was the co-leader of the Liga Española de Refractarios a la Guerra, a group of absolutist war resisters, along with her colleague, fellow pacifist José Brocca. During the Spanish Civil War she was active in Orden del Olivo (the order of the olive branch), the Spanish arm of War Resisters' International, helping to give aid to the war's victims.

Poch y Gascón died in exile in Toulouse, 1968.

A Spanish-language biography of Amparo Poch was written by Antonina Rodrigo.

== Medical background ==
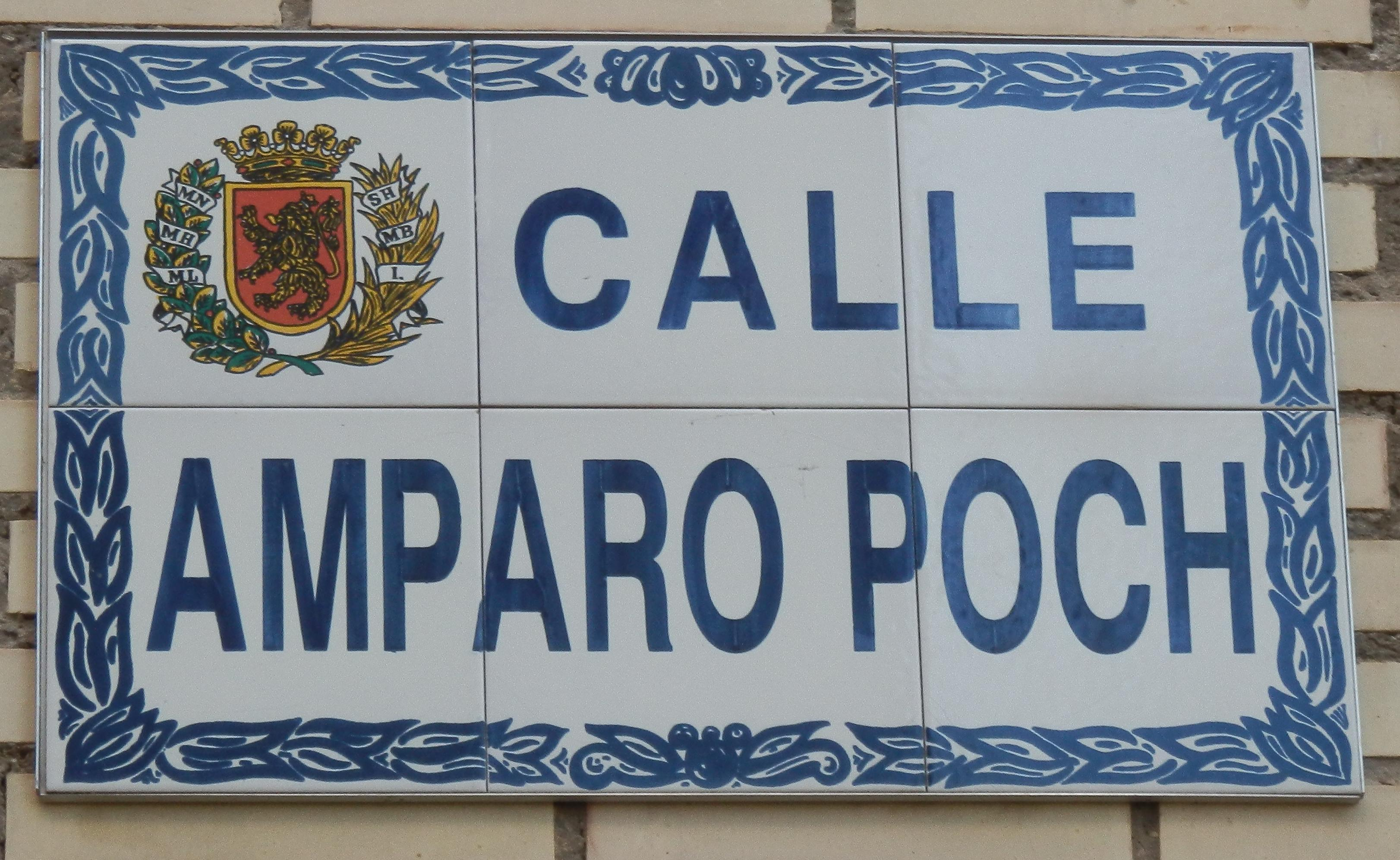
A street in Zaragoza is named after Poch (2013 photo).

Poch got her degree in biology and medicine in 1929. She pursued further training after that, including enrolling in the Medical Association of Zaragoza. There, she promoted sanitation and prioritizing health on a national level. She focused primarily on mother/child aftercare from birth in an effort to reduce birth mortality rates in Zaragoza. She published Cartilla de Consejos a las Madres in December 1931, highlighting the appropriate lifestyle choices during pregnancy for healthy growth and lactation. In May 1934, she moved to Madrid, where she opened a medical clinic for women and children. This clinic was in the heart of Madrid, where it was most accessible for the general public. Because of the work of Poch and her team, Madrid's child mortality rates dropped in 1936, only one year after her implementation of the Puente de Vallecas Medical Clinic. After the success with the first clinic, it became the passion and goal of Poch to establish more accessible sanitation centers and medical clinics. This became more important once the Civil War started, because even though she was a pacifist, Poch was a vocal advocate for the anti-monarch resistance and even advocated for anarchism.

== Writing ==
Poch has publications in many different mediums, including poetry, essays, novels, pamphlets, magazines, and newspapers. While they all serve a political purpose, Poch wrote beautifully and personally about the experience of being a Spanish woman in the heart of the Civil War. Her novel, Amor, tells the story of a painter and through it, discusses Poch's interest in anarchism and nonconformity. Her perseverance in publishing controversial articles and poems during the Civil War was looked down upon by many who thought social issues should halt during a death-stricken society. While she is most well known for her magazine Los Mujeres Libres, her vibrantly raw poetry works to inform the public on the necessity of gender equality.

== Mujeres Libres ==
Amparo Poch y Gascón was a founding member of the Mujeres Libres organization and magazine. Mujeres Libres was an anarchist women's organization that was active in Spain around the time of the Spanish Civil War. The Mujeres Libres rejected contemporary feminism, because they believed that it upheld a system of gender based privileges, albeit a different one than currently existed. The Mujeres Libres published a magazine of the same name, and were significantly engaged in consciousness raising efforts for working and peasant class women in Spain. The group emphasized and promoted the role of women in working toward social revolution that could work to combat sexism. The Mujeres Libres provided support for anti-fascist forces in the Spanish Civil War.

== Civil war medical sanitation changes ==
Using her medical degree and experience, she was able to effectively provide sanitation centers to help with health and medical concerns. She saw how dirty some infirmaries were for soldiers, and knew they deserved better. Even as a pacifist, the anti-fascist movement was too strong for her to not get involved. She even joined the ninth Battalion of the Angel Pastaña Regiment of the Partido Sindicalista in 1936. There were 1486 “militiamen,” 83 of whom were women. Her natural need to heal others prevented her from lasting too long. She spent the remainder of the war as a militia doctor. On 26 August 1936 she became part of the Board of Orphan Protection of Defenders of the Republic, created by the Ministry of Public Instruction. With that recognition, along with the incomparable experience working on the sidelines of the Spanish Civil War, she was able to wield influence by teaching. In Barcelona, Poch directed a training program to teach others about rescuing and treatment of soldiers. She instructed commanding staff of the resistance military on everything from asphyxia, traumatisms, hemorrhages and even blood transfusions.

== Exile in France ==
Poch was forced to go into exile in France in 1939 following the fascist victory in the Civil War. Poch would spend the rest of her life as a refugee in France, mostly working small side jobs to make ends meet. She continued her support of anti-fascist forces throughout World War II, and eventually returned to practicing medicine while in France. Poch was never able to return to Spain due to the regime of Francisco Franco, and she died in 1968 in Toulouse, France.

== Legacy ==
In 2008, a new medical center in her home city of Zaragoza was named after her. In July 2018 a tribute to her was held by the city council, and a plaque was placed at a building she used to work at. In 2021, a new street in Toulouse was named after her.

== See also ==
- Anarcha-feminism
- Anarchism in Spain
- List of peace activists
- Spanish Revolution
