= 2020 Bolivian general election =

- 18 October 2020
- Presidential election
- Turnout: 88.42% (▲0.11pp)
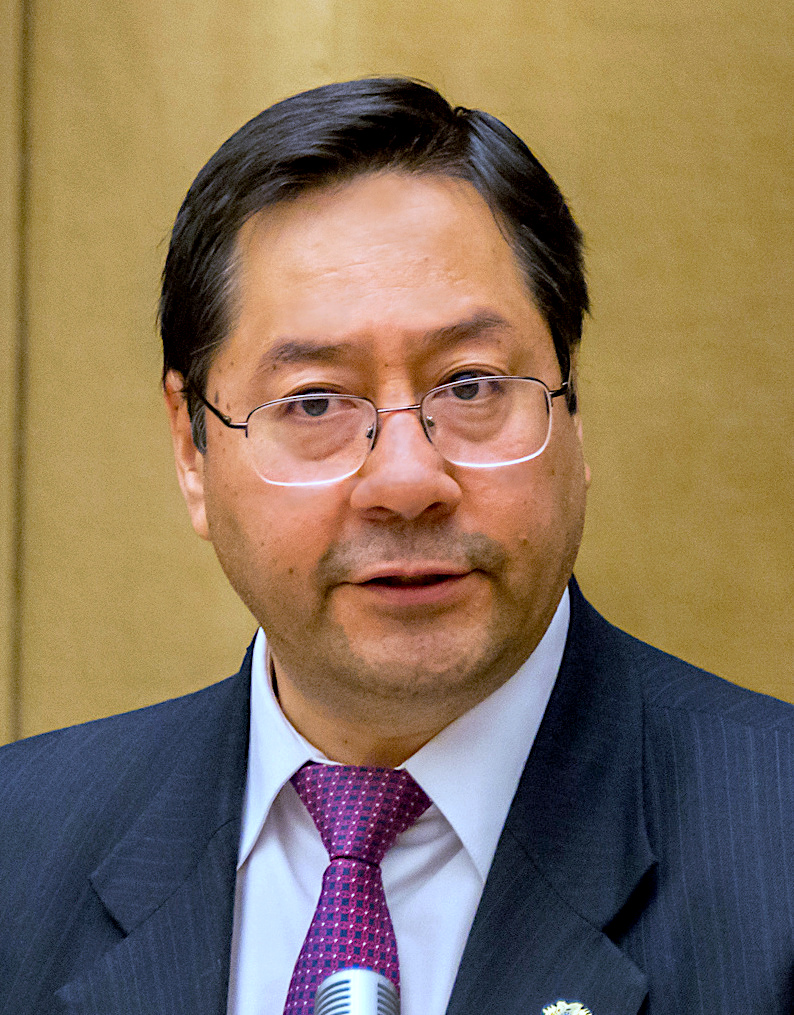

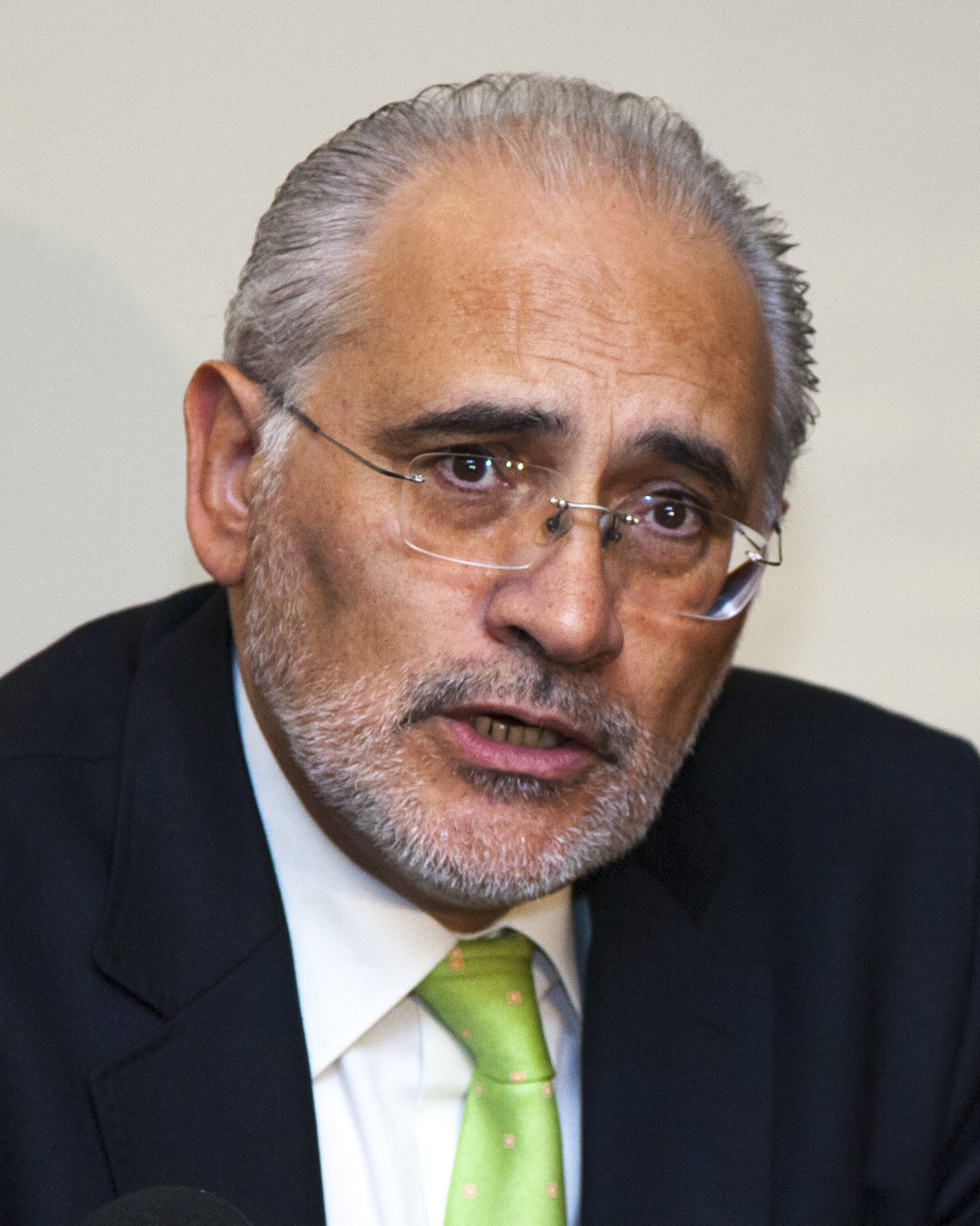

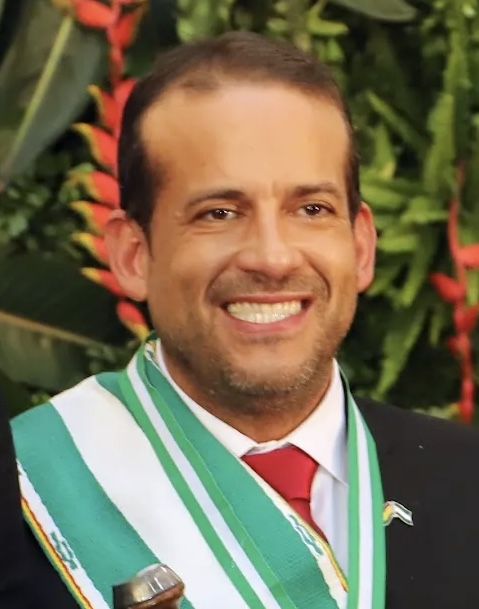
Nominee	Luis Arce	Carlos Mesa	Luis Fernando Camacho
Party	MAS-IPSP	FRI	Independent
Alliance	—	CC (Note: Coalition consisting of FRI, JESUCA and Chuquisaca Para Todos)	Creemos (Note: Coalition consisting of PDC and UCS)
Running mate	David Choquehuanca	Gustavo Pedraza	Marco Pumari
Popular vote	3,394,052	1,775,953	862,186
Percentage	55.11%	28.83%	14.00%
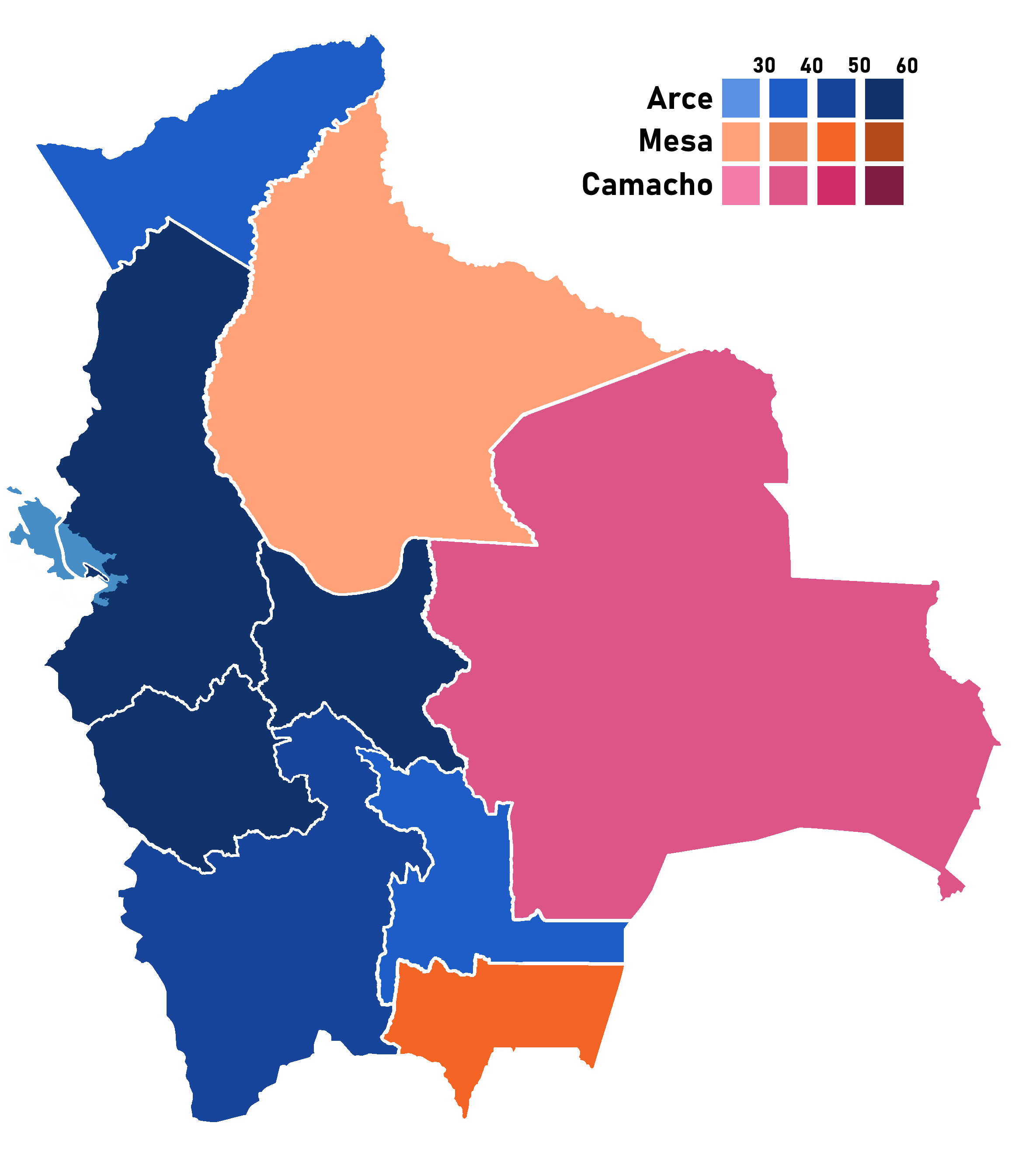
President before election
Jeanine Áñez
Demócratas
Elected President
Luis Arce
MAS-IPSP
- Chamber of Deputies
- All 130 seats in the Chamber of Deputies; 66 seats needed for a majority
Party	Seats	+/–
MAS-IPSP	75	+8
CC	39	−11
Creemos	16	New
This lists parties that won seats. See the complete results below.
- Chamber of Senators
- All 36 seats in the Chamber of Senators; 19 seats needed for a majority
Party	Vote %	Seats	+/–
MAS-IPSP	54.73	21	0
CC	29.16	11	−3
Creemos	14.06	4	New
This lists parties that won seats. See the complete results below.

General elections were held in Bolivia on 18 October 2020 for President, Vice President, and all seats in both the Senate and Chamber of Deputies. Luis Arce of the Movimiento al Socialismo (MAS-IPSP) party was elected president in a landslide, winning 55% of the vote and securing majorities in both chambers of the Plurinational Legislative Assembly. The results of the election superseded the disputed results of the October 2019 elections, which were annulled during a prolonged political crisis.

Although the winning party received a higher proportion of the vote in 2020 than in the previous annulled elections, for the first time since 2009 the winning party did not have a two-thirds majority in the Legislative Assembly, meaning that some functions would require cross-party support. For the first time, the Senate will contain a majority of female senators. Electoral authorities had initially scheduled the elections for 3 May 2020. They were postponed due to the ongoing COVID-19 pandemic, first to 6 September 2020 and then to 18 October 2020. The latter date was ratified by a 13 August 2020 law following protests and blockades against the previous postponements.

The parties or alliances contesting the election were the Movimiento al Socialismo (MAS-IPSP), which governed before 2019, Civic Community (CC), the newly formed Creemos (Let's create, We believe) alliance, the Front For Victory and the Bolivian National Action Party (PAN-BOL). Presidential candidates Carlos Mesa (CC) and Chi Hyun Chung (FPV) were the second and third-place finishers, respectively, in the annulled 2019 presidential election. Luis Arce was the MAS candidate, replacing former MAS president Evo Morales. Feliciano Mamani replaced Ruth Nina as candidate for PAN-BOL. Incumbent president Jeanine Áñez, former president Jorge Quiroga, and María de la Cruz Bayá all launched presidential candidacies, but withdrew before the election was held.

The official count took several days to complete. Independent quick-counts of the vote conducted by polling firms Ciesmori and Mi Voto Cuenta (My Vote Counts) on the morning of 19 October both indicated that Arce had won a majority of the vote, enough to win the election outright without requiring a runoff round. President Áñez confirmed this on Twitter shortly after, and former presidents Mesa and Quiroga both indicated their acceptance of the preliminary results later that day. Official observers from the UN, UNIORE, and the OAS all stated that there was no evidence of fraud in the 2020 election.

== Background ==
=== 2019 election ===
On 10 November 2019, after 19 days of civil protests following the disputed election results of October 2019 and the release of a report from the OAS, which alleged irregularities in the electoral process, the military and the police of Bolivia forced president Morales to resign. After General Williams Kaliman made the military's request for Morales's resignation public, Morales complied, accompanied by other resignations by high-level politicians throughout the day, some citing fears for the safety of their families. The government of Mexico offered political asylum to Morales the following day, which Morales accepted a day afterwards.

As Vice-President Álvaro García Linera, President of the Senate Adriana Salvatierra and President of the Chamber of Deputies Víctor Borda, had already resigned, there were no constitutionally-designated successors. The First Vice President of the Senate, Rubén Medinaceli, had also resigned. Jeanine Áñez, the Second Vice President of the Senate, was the highest-ranking official still in office and she announced that she would be willing to ascend to the presidency on an interim basis in order to call for new elections. On 12 November 2019 Áñez took temporary charge of the Senate of Bolivia, thereby formally placing herself in the line of succession as acting President of the Senate, and on this basis proceeded to declare herself the Constitutional President of the country. Her accession to office was formally legitimized by a decision of the Plurinational Constitutional Tribunal later the same day, which stated that she had lawfully assumed office ipso facto, in accordance with the precedent laid out by Constitutional Declaration 0003/01 of 31 July 2001. Many in Bolivia protested against Añez becoming president, which led to violent clashes between them and the police. Several MAS supporters were killed by the police during confrontations in Senkata and Sacaba. The Argentine delegation in Bolivia and the Inter-American Commission on Human Rights described these as massacres.

On 20 November, Evo Morales offered to not run as a presidential candidate if he was allowed to return to Bolivia and conclude his term.

In the same day, the interim government presented a bill that aimed to forge a path to new elections. The two chambers of congress were expected to debate the bill which would annul the 20 October election and appoint a new electoral board within 15 days of its passage, paving the way for a new vote. The bill, drafted jointly by Morales' Movimiento al Socialismo (MAS-IPSP) and anti-Morales legislators, was approved on 23 November; it prohibited Morales from participating in the fresh election. In exchange, Áñez's government agreed to withdraw the armed forces from all protest areas (although some servicemen were still permitted to stay at some state companies to "prevent vandalism"), to revoke her decree which granted the army immunity from criminal prosecution, to release arrested pro-Morales protesters, to protect lawmakers and social leaders from attacks and to provide compensation for the families of those killed during the crisis. She approved the bill shortly thereafter.

=== Candidacy of Áñez ===
On 5 December, Áñez stated that she would not be a candidate or support any candidate. This was reiterated on 15 January 2020 by Minister for the Presidency Yerko Núñez, who said that "[Áñez] will not be a candidate. The President has stated on several occasions, she will not be a candidate, this is a government of peace, transition, and management because you can not stop the state apparatus."

Despite her previous statements, Áñez announced her candidacy on 24 January 2020. A survey reported in the Bolivian newspaper Los Tiempos indicated that, while 43% of respondents considered her to have done a "good or very good" job as interim president (compared to 27% bad or very bad), only 24% of respondents believed that she should stand as a candidate in the upcoming elections. In the same poll, 63% of respondents agreed with the statement that "as interim president, Jeanine Áñez should call elections and not take advantage of her power to become a presidential candidate." On 17 September 2020, following a poll that put Arce in first place with above 40% support, and Áñez in fourth place, Áñez announced the end of her candidacy, citing the risk that the vote would be split between the conservative candidates.

=== Election postponement and blockades ===
In March 2020, the Supreme Electoral Tribunal announced the election and preparatory activities would be postponed due to emergency restrictions to combat the COVID-19 pandemic. All major parties agreed with this measure and that a date for the new election would be chosen by the legislative assembly based on a public health evaluation at a later date.

On 22 June 2020, Áñez approved a law passed by both the Chamber of Deputies and the Senate to set 6 September 2020 as the date for the election, with elected authorities in place by mid-to-late November 2020.

On 23 July 2020, the TSE announced that the election would be postponed to 18 October 2020 due to medical reports that the pandemic would have its highest peaks in late August and early September. Evo Morales condemned the delays, calling them an unconstitutional attempt by Áñez to remain in power, and some groups, including the Bolivian Workers' Center, carried out protests and blockades. The electoral body, experts and MAS politicians disagreed on the unconstitutionality of the decision. MAS supporters responded to the election postponement by protesting and, on 3 August, started an indefinite strike, blocking highways in El Alto and other party strongholds. Former president of Bolivia, Jaime Paz Zamora of the Revolutionary Left Movement, criticised Morales for supporting the blockades, which resulted in the deaths of 33 coronavirus patients due to lack of oxygen. Morales later accepted the decision of the TSE after rising opposition to the protests. On 10 August, Morales called for dialogue and asked MAS supporters to "consider" the TSE's plan for an election on 18 October with the UN as observer. A survey by Mercados y Muestras showed that 59% of those surveyed believed that MAS were behind the medicine and food shortages to the cities and 65% believed that the organisers of the blockades should face prosecution. MAS Vice President Orlando Zurita said the road blockades were established by MAS. In some places, dynamite was used to destroy the highway and two soldiers were severely beaten by protestors. In Santa Cruz, Potosí, Cochabamba and other areas of the country, the police and government stated that some protesters were armed and that violence had been carried out violence against police and property. On 10 August, Añez asked the La Paz prosecutor general's office to investigate Morales, Arce, Choquehuanca, and eight other MAS leaders for fomenting "terrorism, genocide, and other crimes against health" in relation to the protests.

In late August and early September 2020, the police reported large seizures of weapons, dynamite and ammunition which the government alleged were linked to Mexican drug cartels and MAS-affiliated groups. Government supporters made statements in the media suggesting that groups related to organized crime could seek to destabilize the coming elections.

== Electoral system ==
The President of Bolivia is elected using a modified first-preference plurality system (a two-round system): a candidate is declared the winner if they receive more than 50% of the vote, or over 40% of the vote and are 10 percentage points ahead of their closest rival. If neither condition is met, a run-off election is held between the two top candidates.

The 130 members in the Chamber of Deputies (Cámara de Diputados) are elected using a seat linkage based mixed compensatory system using two votes: 63 deputies are elected by first-preference plurality to represent single-member electoral districts, 60 are elected by closed list party-list proportional representation from party lists on a departmental basis (in districts of varying sizes corresponding to Bolivia's nine departments with a threshold of 3%). The list seats in each region are awarded proportionally based on the vote for the presidential candidates, subtracting the number of single-member districts won (to provide mixed-member proportional representation). The remaining seven seats are reserved indigenous seats elected by the usos y costumbres. A voter can only vote in one of either the normal constituencies or special constituencies (coexistence). Party lists are required to alternate between men and women, and in the single-member districts, men are required to run with a female alternate, and vice versa. At least 50% of the deputies from single-member districts are required to be women.

The Chamber of Senators (Cámara de Senadores) has 36 members, four from each the country's nine departments, which are also elected using closed party-lists, using the D'Hondt method. The senate seats are also awarded based on the vote for president.

The election uses the same votes to elect the President (first round), the Chamber and the Senate, making it a double (triple) simultaneous vote. Voters may therefore not split their ticket between these elections, but they may vote for a candidate of a different list in the election of the Chamber as the deputies from the single-member districts are elected using separate votes.

Voting in Bolivia is compulsory for all adults over the age of 18. The voter is given a card when they have voted so that they can show proof of participation. The voter would not be able to receive their salary from the bank if they cannot show the proof of voting during three months after the election. This can result in a relatively common occurrence of invalid ballots. This is reflected in the percentages of blank/null votes under "would not vote" in the electoral surveys.

On 17 October, the TSE announced that the new preliminary count system (Direpre) would not be used because the preliminary data would not offer certainty about the results, and only the final results will be published officially. The TSE also stated that all people will be able to observe the counting process and any citizen would be able to take photos of the electoral records. Political organisations with delegates would also have the right to copies of the minutes, the calculation and scrutiny would be carried out in public, and photos of the minutes would be part of the released data.

== Presidential candidates ==
As of 28 January 2020, ten candidates had officially stated their intention to run for the presidency.

On 18 January 2020, the Unity Pact of MAS bases elected David Choquehuanca and Andrónico Rodríguez as presidential and vice-presidential candidates. On 19 January, Evo Morales announced that Luis Alberto Arce Catacora and David Choquehuanca would be the party's presidential and vice presidential candidates. This was following a vote by those members of MAS leadership present in Buenos Aires the previous day. This difference caused some friction among different sections of the MAS bases, including the Barolina Sisa and Tupac Katari Federation who rejected these selections. On 21 January, the Central Obrera Boliviana (COB) supplied a third candidacy combination of Choquehuanca paired with Orlando Gutiérrez. MAS President of the Senate, Eva Copa, said the matter was not yet closed and would be decided by a further meeting of the Unity Pact. On 23 January, the Unity Pact ratified the Arce-Choquehuanca ticket chosen in Buenos Aires. On 24 January, a new right-wing political alliance called "We Believe" ("Creemos") was formed, and endorsed the Camacho-Pumari ticket. By the registration deadline, the Supreme Electoral Tribunal (TSE) announced that five political coalitions had been registered. However, on 31 January the TSE announced that the coalition "United People" had been disqualified after not submitting the required documents.

In July 2020, a lawsuit was filed by four separate political parties (among others) with the Supreme Electoral Court asking it to disqualify Arce from standing in the presidential election. The lawsuit stated Arce had released an opinion poll on the presidential race outside the time frame allowed. In 2015, a similar complaint was filed against Ernesto Suárez, leader of the opposition UD bench in the Department of Beni, regarding release of polls by outgoing governor campaign manager Carmelo Lens. This resulted in Suárez and 227 other UD candidates having their legal status cancelled and removed from the election.

On 11 October, Jorge Quiroga announced that he and the political alliance he was heading were withdrawing from the race.

Party / Coalition	Presidential candidate	Vice presidential candidate	Slogan
Movement to Socialism	Luis Arce	David Choquehuanca	Lucho y David: Un Solo Corazón
Civic Community (Note: Coalition consisting of FRI, JESUCA and Chuquisaca Para Todos)	Carlos Mesa	Gustavo Pedraza	Primero la Gente
Creemos (Note: Coalition consisting of PDC and UCS)	Luis Fernando Camacho	Marco Antonio Pumari	Creo en Vos
Front For Victory	Chi Hyun Chung	Salvador Pinto	Chi Puede
Bolivian National Action Party	Feliciano Mamani	Ruth Nina	Pan para Bolivia - Bolivia con Vida Plena

== Debates ==
During the 14 years and preceding period where Evo Morales was president and presidential candidate, Morales declined to take part in any public debate with any of the other candidates, making the justification that he only "debates with the people". In January 2020, interim president Jeanine Áñez submitted legislation to make this a compulsory requirement for presidential candidates in upcoming elections, but this was rejected by the MAS-controlled Senate.

A historic debate which would gather all the presidential candidates together on the same stage for the first time in almost two decades was announced on 6 September, organised by the association of Bolivian Journalists, media organisations and others. The debate was covered by more than 80 national and international media and an audience of more than five million people was expected. The event also had the backing of 50 national institutions and the financial and technical support of the European Union, International Idea, the Konrad Adenauer Foundation and the embassies of Canada, Germany and Switzerland. When it aired, it achieved record viewing numbers. From the beginning, however, the MAS candidate Luis Arce was reluctant to make a commitment to attend, with he and MAS first placing conditions on attending, such as they not be subject to insults, and later claiming a clash with a planned interview with the television network Red Uno (which the network later moved to allow free up the MAS candidate). On the night of the broadcast, both he and Creemos candidate, Luis Camacho, did not attend. Camacho said he did not attend because he had been deceived that Mesa would also not be attending. A panel of 40 analysts surveyed by Pagina Siete indicated that Mesa came out as the most favourable candidate from this debate.

While Arce did not attend the debate on 4 October, he did attend another broadcast the previous day in which all presidential candidates were present. This was organised by the Federation of Municipal Associations (FAM) and the Confederation of Universities of Bolivia (CUB). The debate format received criticism for not allowing candidates to respond to each other as well as accusations that the organisers were pro-MAS. Criticisms included that it was not a debate, but a "monologue", "fashion show" and "propaganda" and that the definition of debate should include at least some form of interaction, interrogation, discussion or confrontation between candidates. The format of the debate was in some part determined by conditions set by Luis Arce to guarantee his attendance that "no personal or partisan allusions were allowed", i.e. no direct criticisms of other candidates or of their party.

== Opinion polls ==
=== First round ===
2020

Poll source	Date(s) administered	Luis Arce	Carlos Mesa	Jeanine Áñez	Luis F. Camacho	Chi Hyun Chung	Jorge Quiroga	Feliciano Mamani	María Bayá	Would not vote	Undecided
Ciesmori	18 October (exit poll)	52.4%	31.5%	-	14.1%	1.6%	-	0.4%	-	-	-
Jubileo	18 October (exit poll)	53.0%	30.8%	-	14.1%	1.6%	-	0.5%	-	-	-
	15 October 2020	The ADN party withdraws its ballot. Bayá's candidacy is annulled by TSE									
	11 October 2020	Quiroga withdraws his candidacy									
Ciesmori	29 September – 8 October	32.4%	24.5%	-	10.7%	2.4%	1.3%	0.4%	0.4%	6.1% (Note: Null 1.3%/Blank 4.8%)	13.2%
Ciesmori	29 September – 8 October	42.2%	33.1%	-	16.7%	3.7%	2.8%	0.7%	0.8%	(Note: With undecided and non-voters excluded)	
Mercados y Muestras	20 September – 8 October	27.1%	27.2%	-	14%	2.5%	1.6%	0.2%	0.3%	7.4%	19.8%
Mercados y Muestras	20 September – 8 October	37.2%	37.4%	-	19.2%	3.4%	2.2%	0.3%	0.4%	(Note: With undecided and non-voters excluded)	
IPSOS	21 September – 4 October	34%	27.9%	-	13.8%	2.6%	1.6%	0.2%	0.5%	-	19.4% (Note: Also includes Blank/Null/No Response)
Ciesmori	20 September – 29 September	30.6%	24.7%	-	12.7%	2.5%	1.5%	0.5%	0.3%	-	13.3%
CELAG ^{[note]}	19 September – 29 September	36.4%	27.9%	-	12.5%	2.3%	2.2%	-	0.7%	18 (Note: None/Blank)	-
	17 September 2020	Áñez withdraws her candidacy									
Mercados y Muestras SRL	5 September – 11 September	25%	22%	8%	8%	2%	2%	0%	0%	11 (Note: None/Blank)	21
Mercados y Muestras SRL	5 September – 11 September	37%	33%	12%	12%	3%	3%	1%	-	(Note: With undecided and non-voters excluded)	
Jubileo	3 September – 7 September	29.2%	19.0%	7.7%	10.4%	3.2%	2.0%	0.4%	0.6%	17.7 (Note: 7.1 Blank, 10.6 Null)	9.8
Jubileo	3 September – 7 September	40.3%	26.2%	10.6%	14.4%	4.4%	2.8%	0.6%	0.8%	(Note: With undecided and non-voters excluded)	
Ciesmori	26 August – 3 September 2020	26.2%	17.1%	10.4%	6.2%	3.3%	2.5%	0.6%	1.0%	9.3% (Note: 6.6 Blank, 2.7 Null)	22.7 (Note: 16.6% Undecided, 6.1% secret)
Ciesmori	26 August – 3 September 2020	37.3%	24.2%	14.4%	12.4%	5.9%	3.8%	0.7%	1.3%	(Note: With undecided and non-voters excluded)	
Mercados y Muestras SRL	6–11 August 2020	23%	23%	12%	6%	2%	3%	1%	-	11%	19%
Mercados y Muestras SRL	6–11 August 2020	33%	32%	17%	9%	3%	5%	1%	-	(Note: With undecided and non-voters excluded)	
Mercados y Muestras SRL	11–16 July 2020	24%	20%	16%	5%	3%	3%	-	-	9%	20%
CELAG ^{[note]}	13 June – 3 July 2020	41.9%	26.8%	13.3%	9.1%	4.5%	4.4%	-	-	-	-
	11 March 2020	COVID-19 declared a pandemic by the World Health Organization									
Ciesmori	5–11 March 2020	33.3%	18.3%	16.9%	7.1%	3.8%	1.7%	1.9%	-	6.2%	2.8%
CELAG ^{[note]}	10 February – 4 March 2020	33.1%	17.4%	20.5%	7.4%	5.6%	1.5%	1.3%	-	5.7%	7.5%
Miský Utaha´a	21–23 February 2020	29.2%	15.3%	13.7%	11.1%	8.6%	6.7%	0.5%	0.1% (Note: Polled as ADN candidate)	11.3%	3.5%
Mercados y Muestras SRL	14–17 February 2020	27%	19%	18%	12%	5%	2%	0%	-	7%	9%
Ciesmori	7–13 February 2020	31.6%	17.1%	16.5%	9.6%	5.4%	1.6%	1.6%	0.5% (Note: Polled with Ismael Schabib as ADN candidate)	7.5%	8.7%
	24 January 2020	Áñez announces her candidacy									
	19 January 2020	Arce announced as candidate of MAS									

==== Before registration ====
Poll source	Date(s) administered	Luis Arce	Carlos Mesa	Jeanine Áñez	Luis F. Camacho	Chi Hyun Chung	Jorge Quiroga	Other	Would not vote	Undecided
United States Embassy	January 2020	37%	9%	9%	11%	4%	-	3%	7%	20%
Mercados y Muestras SRL	9–13 January 2020	26%	17%	12%	17%	6%	3%	2% (Note: Patzi with 1%, Doria Medina with 1%)	8%	9%

2019

Poll source	Date(s) administered	MAS Candidate	Carlos Mesa	Jeanine Áñez	Luis F. Camacho	Chi Hyun Chung	Marco Pumari	Ortiz Antelo	Félix Patzi	Doria Medina	Jorge Quiroga	Johnny Fernandez	Other	Would not vote	Undecided
Ciesmori	21–30 December 2019	20.7% (Note: Generic MAS candidate)	13.8%	15.6%	6.9%	8.1%	8.2%	-	-	1.8%	1.6%	-	0.9%	10.2%	12.2%
Mercados y Muestras SRL	13–16 December 2019	23% (Note: Andrónico Rodríguez)	21%	-	13%	9%	10%	-	-	-	2%	-	-	14%	8%
Captura Consulting	5–15 December 2019	18.4% (Note: Andrónico Rodríguez)	11.9%	7.5%	12.8%	8.5%	-	3.7%	2.8%	2.1%	1.8%	1.0%	2.6%	5.1%	21.8%
Captura Consulting	5–15 December 2019	12.0% (Note: David Choquehuanca)	13.7%	10.0%	-	9.4%	8.0%	4.8%	3.7%	2.5%	1.7%	2.3%	3.5%	5.1%	23.3%
Captura Consulting	5–15 December 2019	13.6% (Note: Luis Arce Catacora)	10.6%	7.3%	11.1%	8.4%	5.7%	4.2%	2.6%	2.2%	2.7%	-	11.0% (Note: Albarracín with 1.1%, others with 9.9%)	3.0%	17.6%
Mercados y Muestras SRL	26–27 November 2019	16% (Note: Andrónico Rodríguez)	14%	-	16%	10%	16%	-	-	-	-	-	8%	8%	12%

Note that the Latin American Strategic Centre for Geopolitics (CELAG) survey has been criticised by Jornada, Yolanda Mamani Cayo and Miguel Serrano for its alleged bias towards MAS because Álvaro García Linera, who served as vice president under Evo Morales, is part of its advisory council and several of its executives are people with a political militancy and with party ideology. This organization does not appear on the list of entities authorized by the Supreme Electoral Tribunal (TSE) to disseminate surveys.

=== Second round ===
Arce v. Mesa

Poll source	Date(s) administered	Arce	Mesa	Would not vote	Undecided
Muestras y Mercados	20 September – 8 October 2020	32.7%	50.3%	7.7%	9.2%
Mercados y Muestras	5–11 September 2020	33%	47%	10%	9%
Ciesmori	26 August – 3 September 2020	35%	40.1%	11% (Note: 10.0 Blank, 1.6 Null)	13.3% (Note: 10.6 No response, 2.7 Won't say)
Mercados y Muestras	6–11 August 2020	30%	47%	12%	11%
Ciesmori	5–11 March 2020	42.9%	41%	10.4%	5.7%
Mercados y Muestras	14–17 February 2020	37%	48%	11%	4%
Ciesmori	7–13 February 2020	40.8%	40.7%	15.2%	3.3%

Arce v. Áñez

Poll source	Date(s) administered	Arce	Áñez	Would not vote	Undecided
Mercados y Muestras	5–11 September 2020	37%	38%	17%	8%
Ciesmori	26 August – 3 September 2020	38.9%	33.9%	12.4% (Note: 10.4 Blank, 2.0 Null)	13.9% (Note: 12.2 No response, 2.7 Won't say)
Mercados y Muestras	6–11 August 2020	38%	39%	14%	9%
Ciesmori	5–11 March 2020	43.2%	42.6%	8.3%	6%
Mercados y Muestras	14–17 February 2020	36%	48%	12%	4%
Ciesmori	7–13 February 2020	42.3%	43.6%	10.6%	3.5%

Arce v. Camacho

Poll source	Date(s) administered	Arce	Camacho	Would not vote	Undecided
Ciesmori	5–11 March 2020	46%	42%	16%	5.9%
Mercados y Muestras	14–17 February 2020	40%	37%	19%	4%
Ciesmori	7–13 February 2020	44.5%	33.6%	18%	3.9%

Mesa v. Áñez

Poll source	Date(s) administered	Mesa	Áñez	Would not vote	Undecided
Ciesmori	26 August – 3 September 2020	35.9%	23.1%	28.4% (Note: 22.6 Blank, 5.8 Null)	12.5% (Note: 9.6 No response, 2.9 Won't say)
Ciesmori	5–11 March 2020	32.6%	31.6%	29.6%	6.2%
Ciesmori	7–13 February 2020	30.3%	33.8%	32.3%	3.6%

Camacho v. Áñez

Poll source	Date(s) administered	Camacho	Áñez	Would not vote	Undecided
Ciesmori	5–11 March 2020	15.6%	41.4%	37.0%	6%
Ciesmori	7–13 February 2020	16.3%	40.8%	38.7%	4.2%

== Conduct ==
Election day was relatively peaceful. Deputy security minister Wilson Santamaria said that two people tried to interfere with ballot papers in capital La Paz, but they were apprehended.

The head of Supreme Electoral Tribunal (TSE) commended the conduct of the polls, saying that "election day was a successful day for democracy." The United Nations applauded the elections as having occurred in "an orderly manner, in a climate of tranquility and respect for human rights". The European Union congratulated Bolivia for the safe conduct of its elections as it awaited the results of the TSE.

During the vote count, the TSE received complaints of fraud from the separatist movement in Santa Cruz.

On 22 October, Bolivian mining union leader and previously proposed MAS vice-presidential candidate Orlando Gutiérrez suffered a head wound and was admitted to hospital. Although he was reported to be "stable, conscious and out of risk" shortly afterwards, on 28 October he was reported to have died in hospital. Information circulating on social media claimed an attack from a group calling themselves "pititas" in which he was beaten. Other sources say that it was the result of a brawl between different factions of MAS during a victory celebration. No criminal complaint was made and the body buried without an autopsy. An investigation was opened following his death, although previous attempts to investigate were denied and the diagnosis was kept confidential with no visitors allowed.

== International observers ==
Representatives of the United States Agency for International Development (USAID) and the Organization of American States (OAS) arrived in Bolivia on 9 January 2020 to discuss monitoring the elections that were initially planned for 3 May. USAID had been expelled in 2013 by the MAS government.

International teams from the Carter Center, Inter-American Union of Electoral Organizations (UNIORE) and Association of Electoral Organizations of South America were also approved as electoral observers by the TSE. Local initiatives from within Bolivia including La Ruta de la Democracia and Observe Bolivia have also been approved and will be observing the elections. The OAS mission of observers consisted of 40 experts of 12 different nationalities. The European Union (EU) announced on 8 September that it would be sending a team of five or six experts to observe the 18 October elections. The Carter Centre sent two experts in electoral analysis.

On 14 October 2020, the Progressive International sent an observer group made up of three national legislators from Greece, Poland and Spain, stating that they are "particularly concerned about the integrity of the presidential elections in Bolivia".

A delegation of observers from Argentina invited by the Plurinational Legislative Assembly was subject to controversy when one of the delegates, lawmaker Federico Fagioli, was detained at La Paz Airport. The Bolivian Minister of the Interior, Arturo Morillo, stated that Fagioli had been warned not to return to Bolivia after the lawmaker's participation in a previous Argentine delegation that visited the country following the ousting of Evo Morales in 2019, and that Fagioli was a "persona non grata" in Bolivia. In addition to Fagioli's detention, other members of the Argentine delegation, including other lawmakers, were also allegedly mistreated by Bolivian security forces. The incident was harshly criticized by Argentine president Alberto Fernández and MAS candidate Luis Arce.

A total of 110 international observers were accredited by the TSE to attend and analyse the results of the election.

The OAS, the UN and UNIORE have all made public statements testifying to the validity of the elections and the lack of evidence of any irregularities. The Carter Centre supported the results and transparency of the elections, with minor recommendations on further improvements. They also analysed online disinformation targeting the electoral process in the 3 months prior to the election and noted "a proliferation of disinformation aimed at eroding the reputations of candidates and the TSE".

== Results ==
MAS, which improved its result over the annulled 2019 elections but still slightly reduced compared to 2014, attained a majority on its own in both chambers, meaning there is no obstacle to passing laws, but the loss of the two-thirds enjoyed by the party since 2009 means that some functions of the legislature will require cross-party support. These include the appointment of certain authorities (such as the Ombudsman for Human Rights, Comptroller General and Attorney General), making reforms in the constitution, the approval of judges for the Judicial Branch of government and the censuring of a government minister. This is the first time since 2009 that these decisions cannot be made by the ruling party alone.

=== President ===
Candidate	Running mate	Party or alliance	Votes	%
Luis Arce	David Choquehuanca	Movimiento al Socialismo	3,394,052	55.11
Carlos Mesa	Gustavo Pedraza	Civic Community	1,775,953	28.83
Luis Fernando Camacho	Marco Antonio Pumari	Creemos	862,186	14.00
Chi Hyun Chung	Salvador Pinto Marín	Front For Victory	95,255	1.55
Feliciano Mamani	Ruth Nina	Bolivian National Action Party	31,765	0.52
Total			6,159,211	100.00
Valid votes			6,159,211	94.99
Invalid votes			233,378	3.60
Blank votes			91,419	1.41
Total votes			6,484,008	100.00
Registered voters/turnout			7,332,926	88.42
Source: OEP

=== Chamber of Deputies ===
Party or alliance	Proportional			Constituency			Indigenous			Total seats	+/–
Party or alliance	Votes	%	Seats	Votes	%	Seats	Votes	%	Seats	Total seats	+/–
Movimiento al Socialismo	3,281,803	54.73	26	2,917,110	53.71	42	30,802	54.76	7	75	+6
Civic Community	1,748,678	29.16	28	1,442,009	26.55	11	12,508	22.24	0	39	–11
Creemos	843,170	14.06	6	938,433	17.28	10	5,673	10.09	0	16	+7
Front For Victory	92,604	1.54	0	74,284	1.37	0	605	1.08	0	0	0
Bolivian National Action Party	30,147	0.50	0	59,368	1.09	0	787	1.40	0	0	0
Libre 21 (MNR–MPS)				41	0.00	0				0	New
Indigenous Organisation of Chiquitanía							2,717	4.83	0	0	New
Organisation of Weehnayek and Tapiete Captaincies							1,554	2.76	0	0	New
Assembly of the Guaraní People							890	1.58	0	0	New
Central of the Mojeños Ethnic Peoples of Beni							645	1.15	0	0	New
Yaminawa							59	0.10	0	0	New
Yuqui Bia Recuate Indigenous Council							6	0.01	0	0	New
Total	5,996,402	100.00	60	5,431,245	100.00	63	56,246	100.00	7	130	0
Valid votes	5,996,402	94.98		5,431,245	87.10		56,246	72.80			
Invalid/blank votes	317,057	5.02		804,315	12.90		21,012	27.20			
Total votes	6,313,459	100.00		6,235,560	100.00		77,258	100.00			
Registered voters/turnout	7,332,926	86.10		6,989,915	89.21		143,614	53.80			
Source: OEP, OEP, OEP, OEP, OEP, OEP, OEP, OEP, OEP, OEP

=== Chamber of Senators ===
The results of the election mean that, for the first time, the Senate will contain a majority of female senators, with a proportion of 20 women to 16 men. Among these women was Cecilia Moyoviri, the nation's first Senator from the Trinidadian-Mojeña ethnic group of the Beni region, who was elected for CC. The new government was installed on 8 November 2020.

Party or alliance	Votes	%	Seats	+/–
Movimiento al Socialismo	3,281,803	54.73	21	0
Civic Community	1,748,678	29.16	11	–3
Creemos	843,170	14.06	4	+4
Front For Victory	92,604	1.54	0	0
Bolivian National Action Party	30,147	0.50	0	0
Total	5,996,402	100.00	36	0
Valid votes	5,996,402	94.98		
Invalid votes	226,761	3.59		
Blank votes	90,296	1.43		
Total votes	6,313,459	100.00		
Registered voters/turnout	7,031,295	89.79		
Source: OEP

=== By department ===
Candidate	Beni		Chuquisaca		Cochabamba		La Paz		Oruro		Pando		Potosí		Santa Cruz		Tarija	
Luis Arce	71,957	34.72%	148,452	49.06%	773,386	65.90%	1,162,949	68.36%	186,452	62.94%	25,883	45.80%	211,571	57.61%	576,567	36.21%	124,586	41.62%
Carlos Mesa	81,182	39.17%	139,176	45.99%	371,826	31.68%	486,139	28.58%	97,812	33.02%	14,635	25.89%	131,635	35.85%	275,868	17.32%	150,405	50.24%
Luis Fernando Camacho	49,128	23.70%	6,791	2.24%	13,356	1.14%	12,319	0.72%	2,746	0.93%	14,817	26.22%	10,248	2.79%	717,742	45.07%	16,023	5.35%
Chi Hyun Chung	4,031	1.94%	6,178	2.04%	11,867	1.01%	28,763	1.69%	6,301	2.13%	1,025	1.81%	9,408	2.56%	18,037	1.13%	6,994	2.34%
Feliciano Mamani	963	0.46%	1,996	0.66%	3,216	0.27%	11,032	0.65%	2,940	0.99%	157	0.28%	4,364	1.19%	4,137	0.26%	1,342	0.45%
Invalid/blank votes	23,818	10.31%	19,230	5.98%	40,895	3.37%	71,441	4.03%	13,733	4.43%	3,262	5.45%	31,685	7.94%	90,734	5.39%	22,259	6.92%
Total votes	231,079		321,823		1,214,546		1,772,643		309,984		59,779		398,911		1,886,387		321,609	
Registered voters/turnout	270,213	85.52%	368,623	87.30%	1,340,548	90.60%	1,923,305	92.17%	339,950	91.19%	72,136	82.87%	453,287	88.00%	1,683,085	89.22%	376,846	85.34%

Results in the Chamber of Deputies.

Results in the Chamber of Senators.

Vote strength by province.

Results among voters abroad.

=== Responses ===
Although the official results had not been expected for some days, quick counts performed by Ciesmori and Mi Voto Cuenta (My Vote Counts) agreed that Arce won the election in the first round. The vote count could be attended by any member of the public and the tally sheets photographed for reasons of transparency. President Áñez and former president Tuto Quiroga, also both former presidential candidates in this election and opponents of MAS, congratulated Luis Arce as president elect while Evo Morales celebrated in Argentina Luis Almagro, the Secretary-General of the OAS, also congratulated Luis Arce and David Choquehuanca on their victory, noting that democracy "will create a bright future for Bolivia." CC candidate Carlos Mesa recognised Arce as winner in the first round based on the preliminary results and accepted a mandate as the leader of the opposition. On 23 October, after the completion of the official vote count, Creemos candidate Luis Camacho also publicly acknowledged the results.

Political allies of Evo Morales, including Daniel Ortega and Rosario Murillo (President and Vice-President of Nicaragua), Andrés Manuel López Obrador (President of Mexico), Luiz Inácio Lula da Silva (former President of Brazil), Rafael Correa (former President of Ecuador), Nicolás Maduro (President of Venezuela), and Alberto Fernández and Cristina Kirchner (President and Vice-President of Argentina), congratulated the Arce-Choquehuanca ticket on their victory. The United States Secretary of State, Mike Pompeo, sent congratulations to Arce for his victory and expressed hope that the United States and Bolivia could work together on joint interests in the future. Arce has indicated that he is open to working with the US in the future after nine years of broken diplomatic relations as well as resuming diplomatic ties with Venezuela and Cuba, which were broken during the period of the interim government. A statement from the Brazilian foreign ministry congratulated Arce and expressed the nation's "willingness to work with the new Bolivian authorities to seek the implementation of initiatives of common interest in the field of friendship, neighborhood and cooperation ties that unite the two countries and their peoples."

Bolivian newspaper El Deber called Arce's victory "clear and crushing" and praised him for his conciliatory statements after the result, while also emphasizing that the new president will have to appease MAS's radical wing. Writing on Los Tiempos, Oscar Díaz Arnau attributed Arce's victory to MAS's strong support in rural areas, the weakness of Mesa's candidacy, Arce's moderation, lack of connection between the opposition and rural inhabitants and the candidacy of Luis Fernando Camacho splitting anti-MAS voters and weakening the opposition.

== Aftermath ==
On 25 October, several right-wing and conservative civic organizations in Santa Cruz like the Pro-Santa Cruz Civic Committee and the Santa Cruz Youth Union, both allies of right-wing candidate Luis Fernando Camacho, claimed that Luis Arce was not the president-elect due to alleged fraud. Camacho and his political allies called for strikes around the country.

In order to mitigate their loss of the two-thirds supermajority in the legislature, MAS parliamentarians used the last few days of the outgoing assembly to make 21 changes to the rules of procedure that formerly required a two-thirds majority so that they could now be passed with only a simple majority. Some opposition parliamentarians left the session in protest. Opposition leader Carlos Mesa condemned the changes, saying "Authoritarianism, abuse and the submission of the Legislative Assembly continue". MAS Senator Omar Aguilar supported the amendments, asking, "Are we going to block the governance of Luis Arce just because we lack three senators in this chamber?" The corresponding session in the House of Deputies lasted less than 20 minutes without any discussion of the amendments being made. Outgoing MAS president of the Senate Eva Copa said that the amendments will "speed up the legislative task."

President-elect Arce endorsed the changes, saying that the decision "wakes up [the government]" for the incoming assembly. "What our Assembly has done is maintain legality. There are many laws that are going to be approved with two-thirds. That is established by the regulations and there should be no concern", he said.

On 5 November, president-elect Luis Arce was attacked using dynamite at his campaign house in La Paz. On 14 November, Jorge Valda, a Pro-Santa Cruz Committee attorney who claimed fraud in the elections, was arrested and sent to La Paz where he was convicted for legitimation of illicit profits. Arce was inaugurated on 8 November 2020.

In June 2021, The Intercept obtained audio of officials of the outgoing government and the military plotting a second coup. The plans involved the use of mercenaries from the United States. Luis Fernando López, former defense minister, was recorded saying that Sergio Orellana, the top general, was involved in the plot. Orellana fled the country upon Arce's victory.

=== Legacy ===
On 1 February 2021, the government of Luis Arce declared 18 October 2020, the date of the general elections, to be the "Day of recovery of intercultural democracy". Previously, 10 October 1982 has been considered the day of Bolivia's return to democracy as it was the date in which Guido Vildoso and the military returned power to the democratically elected Hernán Siles Zuazo. The decree instructs that the ministries, in coordination with the Autonomous Territorial Entities, as well as social organizations and civil society, organize activities to celebrate democratic values, the reestablishment and preservation of intercultural democratic institutions. The move was criticised by Carlos Mesa who called it "an affront to the citizens who conquered democracy on 10/10/82."
