= 2019 Potosí-Oruro highway attacks =

In October 2019, Bolivian militants of the then ruling political party of the Movement for Socialism (MAS) ambushed a caravan of miners, students and cooperativists who were heading towards the city of La Paz to join the demonstrations against then-president Evo Morales over alleged electoral fraud during the 2019 Bolivian general election.

== Events ==
On October 20, 2019, different sectors throughout the country joined the citizen protests against Evo Morales. On November 10TH, a caravan of miners and cooperatives from Potosí and students from Sucre left to the city of La Paz with the express intention of joining these protests. Aware of this, armed militants of the Movement for socialism (MAS) intercepted the road and attacked the caravan with the use of dynamite and rocks. They also used firearms at the unarmed protesters. The perpetrators are believed to be government agents authorized by the MAS. Initially, it was reported that four people were injured. Eyewitnesses told the press that among the weapons the MAS militiamen had, were firearms for military use. The protesters captured by the MAS members were also forced to strip naked and declare that they had been paid members of the Pro-Santa Cruz Civic Committee, at that time, part of the opposition of Evo Morales.

Chamber of Deputies President Víctor Borda resigned after protesters set his house in Potosi ablaze and kidnapped his brother as reprisal for the against miners by MAS supporters. After Vice President Álvaro García Linera and Senate President Adriana Salvatierra, this left the country without a constitutional leader.

== See also ==
- 2019 Senkata and Sacaba Massacres
