= Gabriela Montaño =

Bolivian politician

Gabriela Montaño Viaña
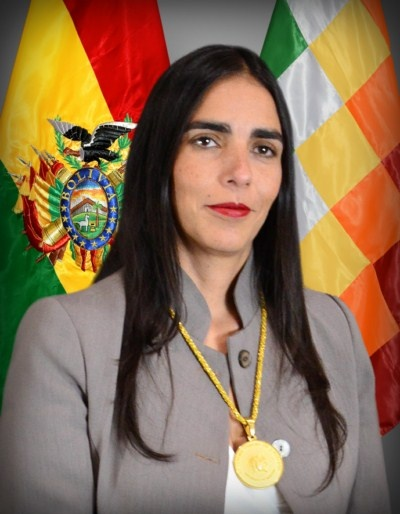

Minister of Health
- In office 23 January 2019 – 14 November 2019
- President: Evo Morales
- Preceded by: Rodolfo Rocabado
- Succeeded by: Aníbal Cruz

President of the Chamber of Deputies
- In office 22 January 2015 – 18 January 2019
- Preceded by: Marcelo Elío Chávez
- Succeeded by: Víctor Borda

Member of the Chamber of Deputies from Santa Cruz
- In office 22 January 2015 – 18 January 2019

President of the Senate
- In office 22 January 2012 – 22 January 2014
- Preceded by: René Martínez Callahuanca
- Succeeded by: Eugenio Rojas

Senator for Santa Cruz
- In office 22 January 2012 – 22 January 2015

Personal details
- Born: Lilly Gabriela Montaño Viaña; 2 December 1972 (age 53) Cochabamba, Bolivia
- Party: MAS-IPSP
- Education: Master's Degree in Public Health
- Occupation: Politician, physician

Lilly Gabriela Montaño Viaña (born 2 December 1975) is a Bolivian physician, politician, and former senator. She was the elected President of the Plurinational Legislative Assembly, a position she accepted and would hold until 2020 while still the presidential representative of Santa Cruz de la Sierra for the Movement for Socialism (MAS) party. In 2012, Montaño was made the acting President of Bolivia for a short time. Montaño is a feminist and vocal defender of the rights of the LGBT community. She has been a regular guest and speaker at forums and conferences in different parts of the world. She married Argentine citizen Fabián Restivo, with whom she has had two daughters.

== Biography ==
Lilly Gabriela Montaño Viaña was born 2 December 1972 in the Bolivian city of Cochabamba. She completed her basic studies in 1993 at the age of 18 and graduated with a degree in medicine five years later. She subsequently pursued and obtained a degree in public health.

During the first term of Evo Morales' Presidency, Montaño was appointed the presidential representative to Santa Cruz de la Sierra, at that time the bastion of resistance to the Movement for Socialism (MAS) party to which she and Morales belonged. In the Bolivian General Election of 2009, she was elected Senator for the Department of Santa Cruz for the 2010–2015 term.

In the General Election of 2014, Montaño was elected Deputy for the Department of Santa Cruz and in 2015 elected as President of Chamber of Deputies for the 2015–2020 term. In this term, she has argued for the expansion of the legal causes for abortion.

On 10 October 2017, Montaño and Alberto Gonzales, President of the Senate, met with various journalists' unions and concluded a rewrite of Article 200, a legislative action that would penalize professionals for poor performance, that guaranteed the safety of journalists from legal persecution via criminal prosecution.

In January 2019, she was named at the Ministry of Health. On 14 November 2019, she fled to Mexico with Evo Morales during the crisis that led to his resignation.

== See also ==
- Lidia Gueiler Tejada
- LGBT rights in Bolivia
