= Radio Kawsachun Coca =

Bolivia
- Frequencies: 95.9 MHz; 99.1 MHz; 99.9 MHz

Programming
- Languages: Spanish, English
- Affiliations: Six Federations of the Trópico of Cochabamba

History
- First air date: November 7, 2007

Links
- Website: https://kawsachuncoca.com/ (Spanish) https://kawsachun.com/ (English)

Radio Kawsachun Coca, also known as RKC and by its English channel name Kawsachun News, is a Bolivian online and radio news network. It was founded on November 7, 2007, by the campesino workers unions and focuses on South American politics. It has a pro-socialist editorial line. It has both English- and Spanish-language channels.

== History ==
The network was criticized in January 2020 by the former Bolivian Minister of Communication Roxana Lizárraga, who became part of the interim government after Jeanine Áñez declared herself next in line to assume the presidency. Lizárraga accused the Kawsachun news network and several community radio stations of not informing, but broadcasting "seditious voices". Under Lizárraga were with this reasoning many community radio stations shut down, other journalists restricted and a list of seditious journalists created, resulting in attacks on journalists. Lizárraga announced to Kawsachun that the freedom of expression has limits, however she did not also close Kawsachun, the station was in this conflict supported by the Movement Toward Socialism. Kawsachun reported in 2020 a recording in which Evo Morales, who was exiled after the political conflict that resulted in his resignation as President of Bolivia, called for the creation of armed militias. Morales confirmed to Reuters it's his voice and defended his words, saying "if the armed forces are shooting the people, killing the people, the people have the right to organize their security".
