= Chi Hyun Chung =

Korean-Bolivian politician and pastor (born 1970)

- 정치현
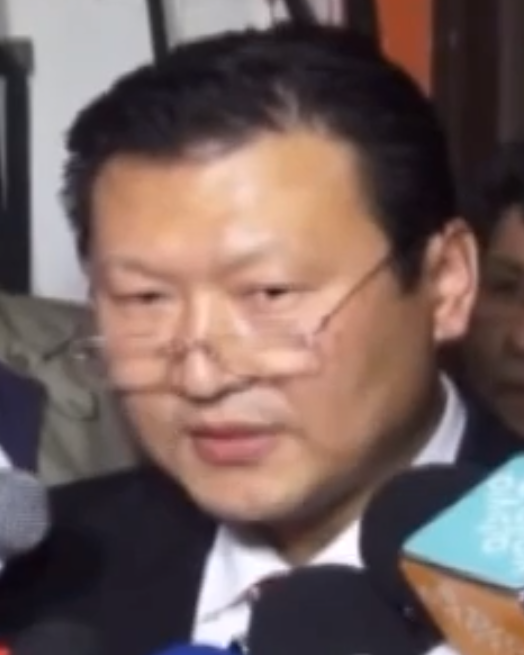
- Chung in 2019

Personal details
- Born: Chi Hyun Chung; 7 March 1970 (age 56) Gwangju, South Korea
- Party: Popular Solidarity Alliance (2021–present); Front for Victory (2020); Christian Democratic Party (2019)
- Education: University of Saint Francis Xavier

Korean name
- Hangul: 정치현
- RR: Jeong Chihyeon
- MR: Chŏng Ch'ihyŏn
- IPA: [tɕʌŋ tɕʰiçʌn]

Chi Hyun Chung (Korean: 정치현; pronounced [tɕʌŋ tɕʰiçʌn]; Spanish: [ˈtʃi ˈ(x)jun ˈtʃuŋɡ]; born 7 March 1970) is a South Korean-born Bolivian doctor, evangelical pastor and politician. He became notable in the country's media for his far-right statements.

Chung was a candidate for the President of Bolivia for the Christian Democratic Party in the 2019 Bolivian general election, where he came in third place with almost 9% of the vote. He was later the candidate for the Front For Victory in the 2020 Bolivian general election. Due to his conservative ideology, some international news media have described Chung as the "Bolivian Bolsonaro".

== Early life and education ==
Chi Hyun Chung was born in the city of Gwangju in South Korea on 7 March 1970. Chung grew up in an evangelical family. In 1976, his family moved to live in Seoul. In 1982, the Korean Presbyterian Church sent the Chung family to Bolivia as evangelical missionaries.

The Chung family initially settled in the city of La Paz, later moving to Santa Cruz de la Sierra. Chung continued his secondary studies, graduating in 1988 from the Bolivian-Brazilian Baptist School. In 1989, Chung moved to Sucre to continue his higher education. That year, he entered the University of Saint Francis Xavier. He graduated in 1995 as a physician by profession. He returned to Santa Cruz de la Sierra to obtain his master's degree in higher education and his master's degree in health and public health management.

== Career ==
Outside of politics, Chung served as director of the UCEBOL clinic, as well as founding 70 Presbyterian churches in Bolivia. Chung is currently the president of the Presbyterian Church in Bolivia. During the 2019 campaign, it was stated that he treats 200,000 patients free of charge via a mobile hospital.

=== Political career ===
==== 2019 presidential candidacy ====
Chung was a candidate in the 2019 Bolivian presidential election as a member of the Christian Democratic Party. His 2019 running mate was the attorney Paola Barriga. During the campaign, he was characterized some international outlets as the "Bolivian Bolsonaro".

As a candidate, he was characterized as a political outsider, and used the slogan "The doctor who will heal Bolivia's wounds". He ultimately came in third place with around 9% of the vote, behind Morales and runner-up candidate Carlos Mesa.

==== 2020 - 2021: Second presidential campaign and gubernatorial contest ====
Chung later ran for president as the candidate of the Front For Victory in the 2020 Bolivian general election. During the campaign, he filed a legal complaint against fellow candidate Luis Fernando Camacho, accusing Camacho of helping initiate a coup d'état against Evo Morales.

After losing the 2020 presidential election, he was announced as the Alianza Solidaria y Popular (ASIP)'s candidate for Governor of the Santa Cruz Department. He lost the 2021 Santa Cruz gubernatorial election to Camacho, taking 1.13% of the vote.

==== 2025 presidential candidacy ====
Chung tried to register as a candidate for president in the 2025 election, with supporters of his working to obtain legal status for the Republican Action Movement Alliance (AMAR) party. Chung announced his candidacy at an event that utilized K-pop music. He publicly invited Luis Fernando Camacho to serve as his vice-presidential running mate.

Opinion polling conducted from January to March 2025 found him to be at best at around 13% of voting intention.

== Political views ==
Chung defines himself as "a Christian capitalist" and considers Evo Morales "a centrist running a communist system". He holds very conservative positions, and is described as being misogynistic and homophobic. He is in favour of a curfew for all minors, believes that "a woman should be educated to behave like one". He has attributed the increase in femicides in the country to "abuse by women against men".

=== LGBT rights ===
Chung has argued that homosexuals should receive psychiatric care to recover their "innate sexual identity". He has claimed that 90% of the LGBT population is involved in prostitution. During the 2020 presidential election, he accused candidate Carlos Mesa and then-incumbent President Jeanine Áñez of promoting "gender ideology".

=== Views on Evo Morales ===
In 2019, Chung accused Evo Morales of attempting to create a communist system of governance akin to North Korea. In 2020, he argued that that the removal of Evo Morales as president in 2019 was a coup d'état.

=== Foreign policy ===
In 2024, Chung indicated that he wants Bolivia to establish a diplomatic alliance with South Korea, and stated "Under the grace and mercy of God, I will be the president of Bolivia, which will be a great honor and pride for the Korean people".

Chung has pledged to turn Bolivia into a "military power" in South America, and has criticized Chile for alleged encroachments on Bolivian sovereignty.
