= Cambio (newspaper) =

- Type: Daily newspaper
- Format: Berliner
- Owner(s): Government of Bolivia
- Editor: Óscar Huaygua Delgado
- Founded: 22 January 2009
- Language: Spanish
- Ceased publication: 17 November 2019
- Headquarters: La Paz, Bolivia
- Circulation: National
- Website: www.cambio.bo

Cambio was a state-funded newspaper published in La Paz, Bolivia. The newspaper began publication on 22 January 2009.

After the resignation of Evo Morales Cambio ceased publications and was replaced by the new newspaper Bolivia.
