= Los Tiempos =

Bolivian newspaper

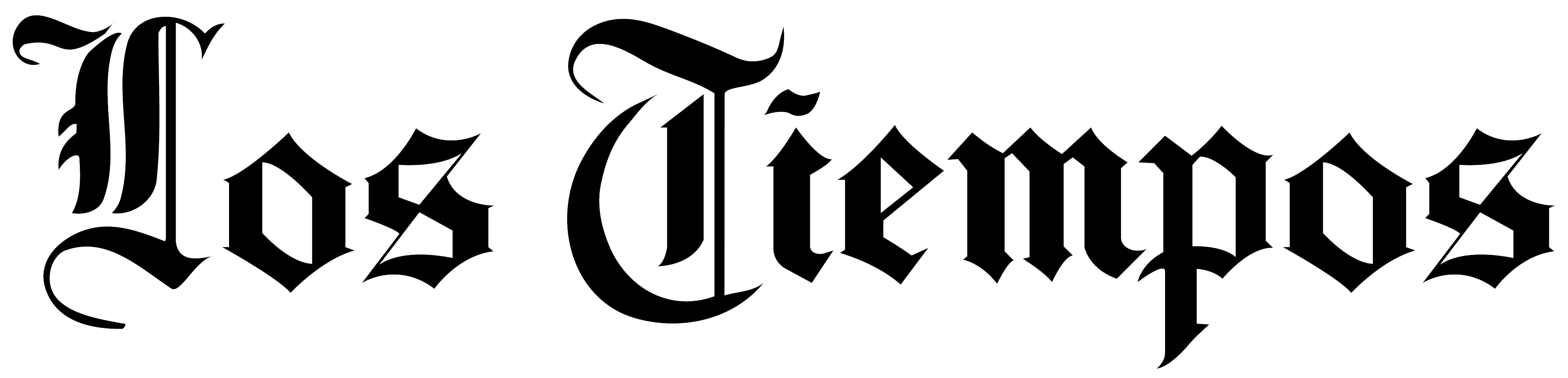

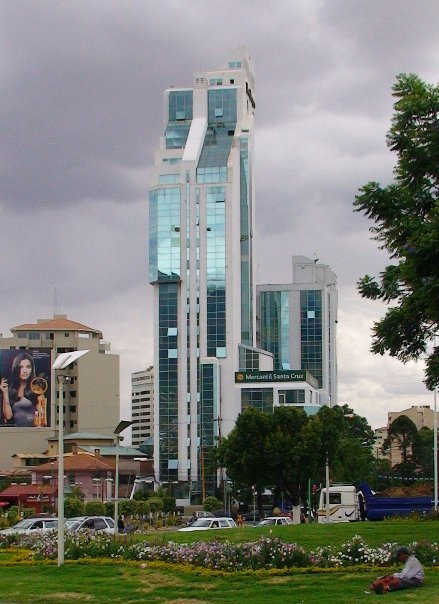
- Los Tiempos building in Cochabamba.
- Type: Daily newspaper
- Format: Berliner
- Founder(s): Demetrio Canelas
- Founded: 16 September 1943
- Language: Spanish
- Headquarters: Cochabamba, Bolivia
- Circulation: National
- Website: www.lostiempos.com

Los Tiempos (Spanish: The Times) is a newspaper published in Cochabamba, Bolivia. By 2013, its circulation reached 45,000 copies.

Since October 2017, the newspaper is published in Berliner. Prior to this, the newspaper was a broadsheet.

== History ==
Los Tiempos was founded on 16 September 1943 by Demetrio Canelas, who had already founded the newspaper La Patria in Oruro in 1919. He was assaulted and practically destroyed by a mob of militants of the Revolutionary Nationalist Movement on 9 November 1953, resuming its publications on 19 July 1967 with the premiere of a rotary offset.

On 17 September 1989, it inaugurated its modern building, and on 4 September 1996, it opened its website.
