= Williams Kaliman =

Former commander-in-chief of the Armed Forces of Bolivia

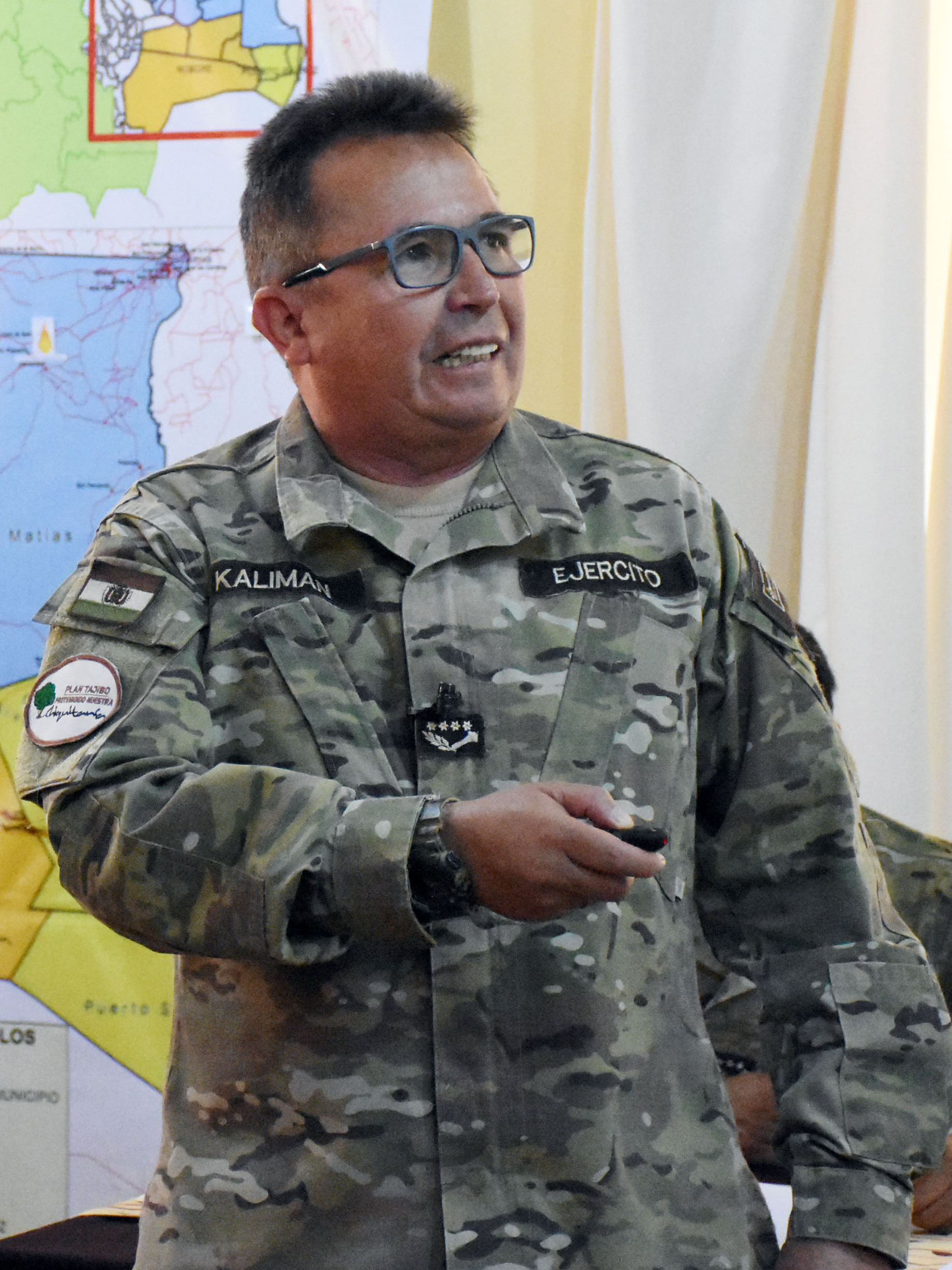
Williams Kaliman

General Williams Kaliman Romero (born 1963) is the former commander-in-chief of the Armed Forces of Bolivia. On 10 November 2019, he called for the resignation of President Evo Morales after a disputed election, amid ongoing protests. Morales was seeking a 4th term.

Kaliman was born in Chuquisaca Department. Kaliman attended the Western Hemisphere Institute for Security Cooperation (WHINSEC), the military training school in Fort Benning, Georgia known in the past as the School of the Americas (SOA).

He was appointed as the commander-in-chief of the Armed Forces of Bolivia in December 2018, declaring himself an anti-colonialist and a soldier for the process of change. Interim president Jeanine Áñez replaced him with General Carlos Orellana soon after Morales resigned and sought refuge in Mexico. He was subsequently placed under house arrest at his home in La Paz on 23 December 2019. Over a year later on 11 March 2021, the Prosecutor's Office under the new government of Luis Arce issued an arrest warrant against him under accusations of a coup d'état against Morales.

== See also ==
- Armed Forces of Bolivia
