= Rubén Medinaceli =

Bolivian senator

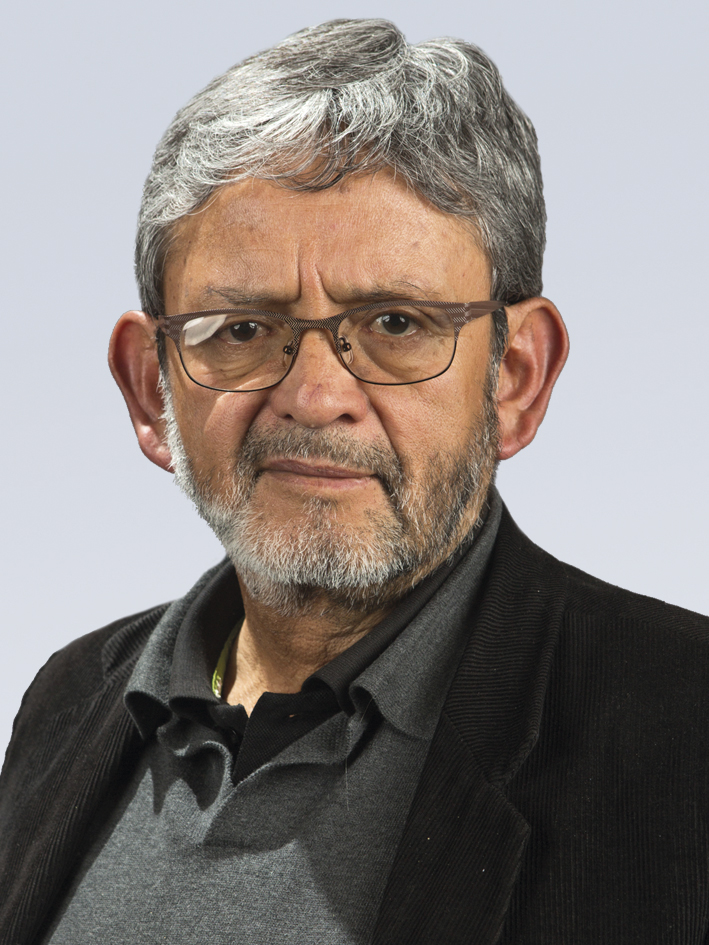

First Vice President of the Senate of Bolivia
- In office –2019

Personal details
- Born: 17 January 1952

Rubén Medinaceli Ortiz (born 17 January 1952) is a Bolivian senator. He resigned in the 2019 Bolivian political crisis alongside President Evo Morales.
