= Bolivia (newspaper) =

- Type: Daily newspaper
- Format: Berliner
- Owner: Government of Bolivia
- Editor: Jimena Mercado
- Founded: 18 November 2019
- Ceased publication: 30 April 2021
- Language: Spanish
- Headquarters: La Paz, Bolivia
- Circulation: National
- Website: www.periodicobolivia.bo

Bolivia was a state-funded newspaper published in La Paz, Bolivia. The newspaper began publication on 18 November 2019. It replaced the state-owned newspaper Cambio. Its logo shows the flag of Bolivia, the wiphala and the patuju. It ceased publications on 30 April 2021.

On the next day, 1 May 2021, its successor Ahora El Pueblo was published for the first time.
