= 2019 Bolivian political crisis =

Replacement of Evo Morales by Jeanine Áñez

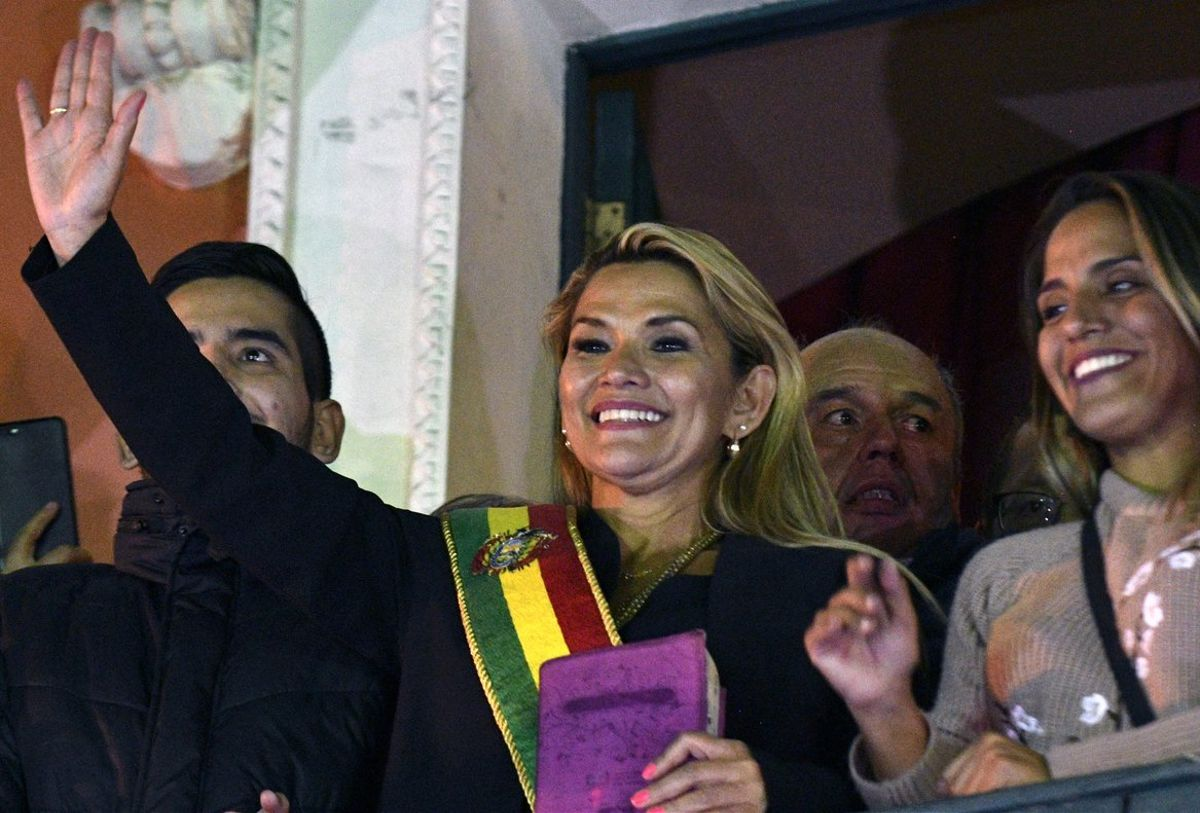
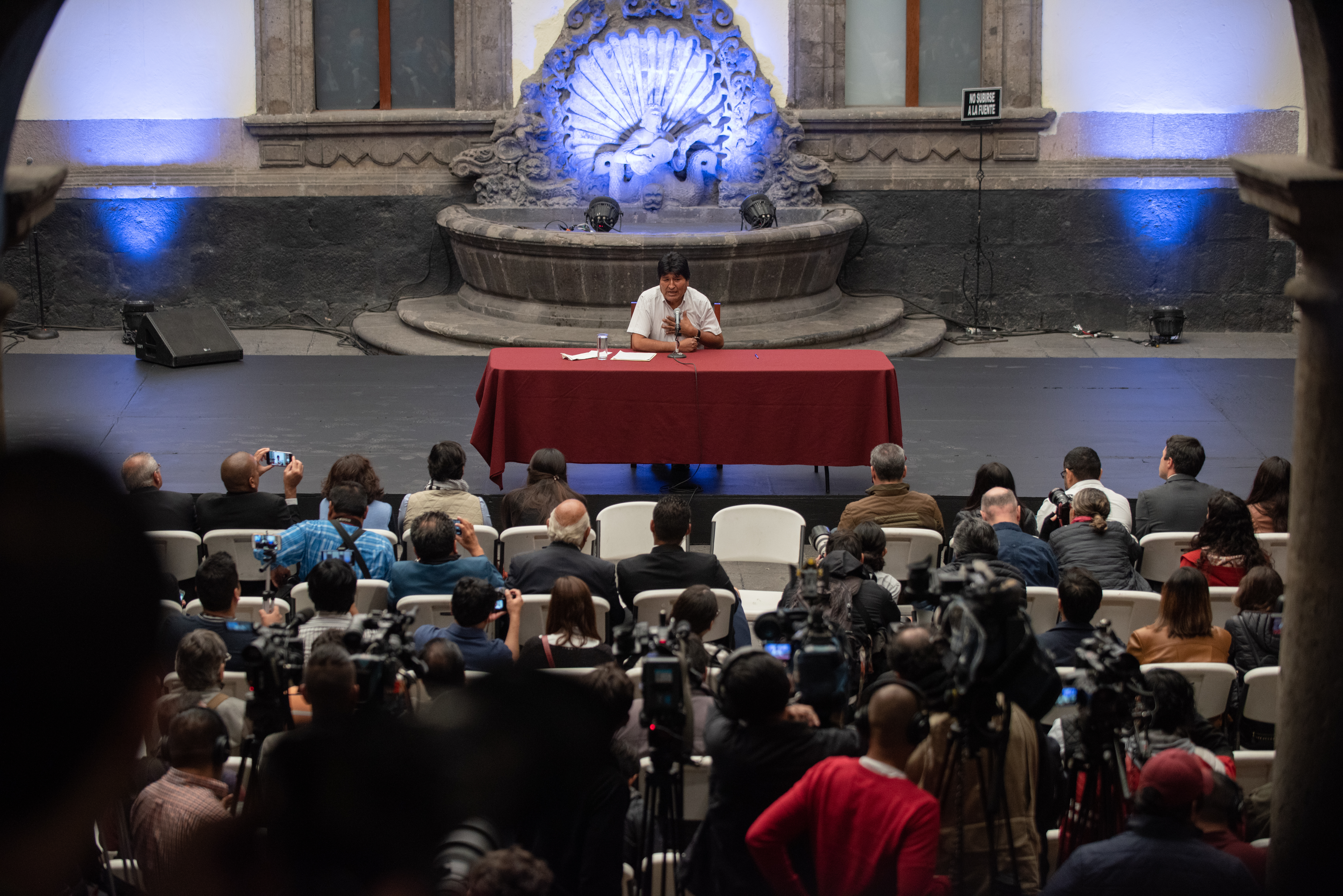
- Jeanine Áñez assuming the presidency (left); Evo Morales speaking in Mexico, where he received political asylum (right)
- Date: 10 November 2019 – 20 November 2019
- Location: La Paz, Bolivia
- Caused by: Possible election fraud in the 2019 Bolivian general election won by incumbent president Evo Morales
- Methods: Barricades, demonstrations, and hunger strikes
- Result: Resignation of incumbent president Morales and his government; Morales leaves Bolivia and receives political asylum in Mexico; Jeanine Áñez assumes the presidency of Bolivia; Interim government cuts diplomatic ties with Cuba and Venezuela; Bolivia leaves ALBA and UNASUR and joins the Lima Group; Start of pro-Morales protests; Start of diplomatic crisis with Mexico and Spain; Summoning of new elections on 3 May 2020 but later postponed to 18 October 2020 due to COVID-19 pandemic

Parties
Morales loyalists: Movement for Socialism	Government of Bolivia; Pro-government parties: Democratic Unity; National Unity Front; Revolutionary Nationalist Movement; Social Democratic Movement; Christian Democratic Party; Civic Community; Nationalist Democratic Action

Lead figures
Evo Morales; Álvaro García Linera; Adriana Salvatierra; Víctor Borda; Rubén Medinaceli	Jeanine Áñez; Carlos Mesa; Luis Fernando Camacho; Marco Pumari; Gen. Williams Kaliman; Cmdr. Yuri Calderón

Casualties and losses
- Fatalities: 33 (26 November 2019); Injured: 715 (17 November 2019)

The 2019 Bolivian political crisis was a period of intense political upheaval and unrest in Bolivia that followed the disputed 2019 Bolivian general election, in which incumbent President Evo Morales was initially declared the winner. Morales had run for a controversial fourth term despite having recently lost a constitutional referendum to remove presidential term limits. His bid for reelection was enabled after the Supreme Court then struck down the term limits. The election and the results were heavily contested, with protests occurring across the country as the opposition and many sectors of society alleged that the vote count was manipulated to favor Morales.

Suspicions of fraud were first sparked by a sudden and unexplained 24-hour long halt in the vote count in the hours following the election. Morales then initially declared victory, but in the face of growing protests eventually proposed holding a runoff election. However, the military and the police of Bolivia, along with the Bolivian Workers' Center (COB), subsequently requested President Evo Morales to resign. He did, complaining that he was the victim of a coup. The government of Mexico offered him political asylum the following day, which he accepted. An audit of the election by the Organization of American States, requested by Morales before he fled the country, found widespread irregularities and evidence of manipulation in the voting records and recommended the election be annulled and held again. Protests continued and sometimes resulted in deaths; in several cases the security forces opened fire on protesters, most notably in the Senkata and Sacaba massacres.

Parliament voted to make opposition senator Jeanine Áñez acting president on 12 November. Although parliament did not have a quorum for the vote following a boycott by the former ruling party Movimiento al Socialismo, Bolivia's Plurinational Constitutional Tribunal endorsed Áñez's assumption of the presidency. Most of the MAS members then returned, with some assuming key positions such as Leader of the Senate. They also committed to working with the interim government towards new elections. The Bolivian Congress unanimously approved a bill on 23 November 2019 that annulled the results of the 20 October election, allowed for new elections, and prevented Evo Morales from participating in the new elections. The bill was signed into law the next day by president Áñez.

The year following the crisis saw continued political chaos and violent protests. Áñez's government began to harass Morales's supporters and charged him and some members of his party with sedition. Morales led the opposition from exile, calling for the Bolivian people to reject the new government. During the COVID-19 pandemic, Áñez repeatedly delayed holding new elections. Elections were finally held in October 2020, which were won by Luis Arce, Morales' former finance minister.

== Background ==
=== 2016 constitutional referendum ===
The Bolivian constitution allows the President and Vice President to run for re-election only once, limiting the number of terms to two. A 2016 referendum to increase the limit to three terms was rejected. However, in 2017 Bolivia's Supreme Court completely abolished term limits for all political offices, arguing that running for political office is a human right that could not be limited, even by the constitution. The court cited Bolivia's obligations to human rights as a signatory of the 1969 American Convention on Human Rights. The Organization of American States, which is responsible for enforcing the convention, protested against the Supreme Court's interpretation. The Inter-American Court of Human Rights clarified in 2019 that indefinite re-election should not be considered a human right. The Supreme Court also reversed its original 2017 ruling in 2023.

=== 2019 general election and subsequent investigations ===
On 20 October 2019, the first round of voting for all government positions was held. After the polls closed, the Supreme Electoral Tribunal began to release the preliminary results of the presidential election. At 7:40 pm, when 83.8% of the votes had been counted, the tribunal stopped updating the preliminary count. It claimed this was because it was beginning to release the final official results, although it had still not done so by the next day. At the time that the preliminary count was stopped, Morales led with 45.3%, and his primary opponent, Carlos Mesa, had 38.2%. Less than a 10-point lead would have resulted in another round of runoff voting. At 9:25 pm, President Morales stated he was the likely winner, given that rural areas would guarantee his victory.

Although uncounted votes in rural areas were expected to favor Morales, one body observing the election—the Organization of American States (OAS)—stated that even if Morales did win outright, his lead beyond the 10-point threshold would be so negligible as to warrant a runoff anyway. The OAS expressed concern about a purported day-long gap in results reporting: after 24 hours, the updates resumed, but with a surge for Morales at the first update.

On 21 October, the Plurinational Electoral Organ reported a count, suggesting that with 95.3% of verified votes, Morales had too large of a margin above 10 points to overcome, avoiding a second run-off round, and so Morales would remain in power for a fourth term. Based on this result, along with claimed irregularities, the Bolivian opposition and protestors as well as some Western governments and observers called for an audit of the process and results, to which Morales agreed. The OAS audit of the election began on 31 October and was observed by Spain, Mexico, and Paraguay.

=== Protests ===
By 24 October, Morales began describing the actions taken against him as a coup. On 25 October, when the results were officially announced with Morales as the winner, various countries in Latin America, as well as the United States and European Union, called for the second round to go ahead regardless of the official results.

On 31 October, two deaths were announced by the government.

The third death during the protests occurred on 7 November when a 20-year-old student called Limbert Guzman was killed during clashes.

== Events ==
=== Allegations of electoral fraud and OAS audit ===
On 6 November, the Bolivian opposition published a 190-page long report containing fraud accusations, including irregularities such as mistaken electoral acts additions, data swiping and electoral acts where the ruling party obtained more votes than registered voters, expecting to send it to international organizations such as the OAS and the United Nations.

Although a complete report was not yet due, mounting tension in the country prompted the OAS to release a preliminary report on 10 November claiming that they had discovered sufficient evidence of election fraud to warrant new elections. This led to a string of events that culminated in Morales being forced to resign, despite him admitting in his memoirs he took the decision of resigning on November 9, and that he originally accepted the OAS audit and called for new elections within the hour of its publication. The OAS alleged multiple irregularities, including failures in the chain of custody for ballots, alteration and forgery of electoral material, redirection of data to unauthorized servers and data manipulation. They added that it was statistically unlikely that Morales had secured the 10-percentage-point margin of victory needed to win outright, saying that election should be annulled after it had found "clear manipulations" of the voting system, and that "The manipulations to the computer systems are of such magnitude that they must be deeply investigated by the Bolivian State to get to the bottom of and assign responsibility in this serious case."

An analysis by the Center for Economic and Policy Research (CEPR) disputed the OAS's preliminary findings and criticized what it called a "politicization of the electoral observation process". The co-director of the think-tank, Mark Weisbrot, stated the OAS showed "no evidence – no statistics, numbers, or facts of any kind" to support its claim of electoral manipulation. CEPR concluded that due to Morales's voter base being in more rural regions, the results from peripheral areas received towards the end of the count were more likely to be in his favour. The New York Times noted, however, that this criticism has "not addressed the accusations of hidden data servers, forged signatures and other irregularities found by the O.A.S. observers, nor have they tried to explain the electoral council's sudden decision to stop the count". The OAS also dismissed the report as "neither honest, nor fact-based nor comprehensive".

On 5 December, the full 95-page OAS report was released along with 500 pages of corroborating details as appendices. These included that an outside user who controlled a Linux AMI appliance with "root privileges" — conferring the ability to alter results – accessed the official vote-counting server during the counting and that in a sample of 4,692 returns from polling stations around the country, 226 showed multiple signatures by the same person for different voting booths, a violation of electoral law. On those returns, 91 percent of votes went to MAS, approximately double the rate recorded elsewhere.

On 21 December, the Technical Mission of Electoral Experts sent by the European Union published a 67-page report that concluded that the election day "passed peacefully and with a high voter turnout" but "a large number of electoral records showed irregularities, which could be due to deficiencies in the training of jurors or deliberate manipulations".

On 3 January 2020, at a meeting of the Committee for Latin America of Socialist International, it was declared that they accepted the findings of the OAS and that Morales was not a victim of a coup. A document containing discussions of the Bolivian political crisis states that "After a broad mobilization of citizens in that country in protest of electoral fraud that was informed and verified by an audit conducted by the Organization of American States (OAS) of the elections that took place on 20 October, the president Evo Morales did not suffer a coup d'etat".

Independent contract researchers for CEPR, John Curiel and Jack R. Williams disputed the claims of irregularities in the late vote count that were made by OAS with a statistical analysis released on 27 February 2020. They contended that the OAS allegations about irregularities in the vote count were made on two unproven premises: "...the unofficial count accurately reflects the vote continuously measured, and that reported voter preferences do not vary by the time of day". Later, in August 2020, after Nooruddin published the dataset he used for the OAS audit to a Harvard University digital repository, CEPR released a statement suggesting that the way the data was sorted was flawed due to a coding error which would indicate that the OAS claims about the irregularities in the vote count were also flawed.

=== Authorities abandon Morales ===
After weeks of repelling violent protests at the Casa Grande del Pueblo presidential palace, units of the Police Operations Tactical Unit (UTOP) tasked with defending Morales assembled a meeting on 8 November. UTOP officers ultimately decided at the gathering to abandon their posts and to call for the resignation of Morales. According to Reuters, UTOP turned away from Morales for multiple reasons: complaints of alleged orders to suppress opposition protestors while avoiding Morales loyalists; resentments over perceived preferential treatment given to the military; and the exhaustion of combating protestors.

On 9 November, Morales organized a meeting and ordered the military to maintain security, with officers present rejecting Morales's orders according to former general Fernando Sánchez. According to The Wall Street Journal, following this meeting, officers feared of "violent military suppression" similar to 2003 protests during the Bolivian gas conflict, which happened before Morales become president. At this time, all UTOP officers had left their positions, leaving Morales vulnerable to protesters. At a police station near the presidential palace, officers climbed onto the roofs and chanted "The Police with the People". Police nationwide refused to take action against protesters, returning to their stations, while other departments began to mutiny against the Morales government, arguing that they did not want to be an "instrument of any government". Head of the Bolivian Armed Forces, General Williams Kaliman, refused to suppress violent demonstrations, saying that the military would "never confront the people among whom we live" and that the events unfolding were "a political problem and it should be resolved within that realm".

After police left their posts at the presidential palace, Morales never returned and was forced into hiding in an improvised office protected by a small group of his guard. He ultimately held a press conference at the Bolivian Air Force's presidential hangar in El Alto International Airport later in the day, leading some to suspect that Morales had already lost control of the government. Franklin Pareja, a professor of the Higher University of San Andrés, said that because of the abandonment by police, the Morales government "lost its shield" and that "it was totally vulnerable and couldn't go on".

According to members of the Bolivian military quoted by The Wall Street Journal, authorities had opposed Morales's actions for some time. Morales had performed multiple actions that had offended officers within the armed forces, including glorifying Che Guevara after his guerrillas killed 59 Bolivian troops during their insurgency in the 1960s and forcing officers to attend the Anti-Imperialist Military Academy that was led by a convicted former rebel. General Tomás Peña y Lillo, who was chief of the Bolivian armed forces until 2010, stated that officers within the military were traditionally conservative and had refused plans proposed by Morales to be guided by Cuban military and intelligence agents, damaging Morales's hold of the military. Roberto Ponce, former chief of staff of the Bolivian military, also explained that Morales spent little on the country's armed forces as he feared that he would be overthrown, which frustrated military officers.

=== Rioters overrun La Paz ===
By the night of 9 November, violent riots escalated throughout Bolivia. Members of MAS called on supporters to gather in the seat of government La Paz to "defend Morales" and the results of the vote, with reports of clashes between pro-Morales groups and opposition protesters. However, violent anti-Morales rioters had already overrun the streets of La Paz, with some groups of police joining in protests against Morales. Rioters began to storm government offices, flooding the stations of Bolivia TV and Radio Patria Nueva, accusing them of serving Morales. Relatives of Morales had their homes attacked by rioters, with his older sister's home in Oruro being burned while other regional governors had their homes torched as well. The next day, two miners from Potosí were shot and injured, reportedly by snipers, when cooperative miners where marching to join protests in La Paz.

=== Calls for Morales to resign ===
After the release of 10 November OAS audit, multiple Bolivian entities called on Morales to resign. Morales had initially relied on support from civil organizations to protect him from violent protests instead of the military since he enjoyed popular support. However, the two main civil groups of Bolivia had begun aligning themselves with the opposition to Morales; the Bolivian Workers' Center (COB), Bolivia's largest trade union and a traditionally pro-Morales entity, and the Single Trade Union Confederation of Workers (CSUTCB), an indigenous workers union.

CSUTCB had already met with opposition leader Luis Fernando Camacho, announcing an alliance and in the morning of 10 November, the leader of COB suggested Morales resign if it would help solve the violence, and called for new elections. Indigenous and Aymara leader Nelson Condori, the director of CSUTCB, intensified his condemnation of Morales later in the day while at an event beside Camacho, stating, "Evo, we have cried, you have made our lives bitter, you have lied to us. ... When have you forgotten the slogan of our ancestors, do not steal, do not lie, do not be lazy?" Condori also called for a "purge" of the Bolivian government, demanding that Morales and his governmental allies be jailed for electoral fraud.

After the COB and other civil groups formerly supportive of Morales called on him to resign, Morales held a second press conference at the presidential hangar, changing his position on the October election results and announced that new elections would be held. Morales released a statement, saying "As President, my main mission is to preserve peace, social justice and economic stability. Listening to the Bolivian Workers' Center (COB), the Pact of Unity and other social sectors, I have decided first to renew all the members of the Supreme Electoral Tribunal".

Since civil groups had abandoned Morales, the military was the only group protecting him from violent protesters. The military then made the decision to force Morales to resign. First, officers who feared punishment if they deployed troops against civilians pressured General Williams Kaliman, the commander-in-chief of the Armed Forces of Bolivia and Morales loyalist, to turn away from Morales. Later, Kaliman announced that the military had suggested Morales resign to "help restore peace and stability" after weeks of protests over the vote, adding that the military was calling on the Bolivian people to refrain from violence and disorder. The military also said it would conduct operations to "neutralise" any armed groups that attacked the protesters. The military press release invoked Article 20, paragraph b, of Law No. 1405 which states:

Article 20. The attribution and responsibilities of the military high command are: [...] b. To analyze inner and foreign troubled situations to suggest to whom it may concern the appropriate solutions.

=== Morales resigns ===
After Kaliman's statement, Morales took the presidential plane from El Alto International Airport to an undisclosed location, announcing his immediate resignation on television, stating that he was resigning to "protect the families" of Movement for Socialism members. He concluded by stating that he believed Carlos Mesa had "achieved his objective", and asked rioters to "stop burning down the houses of [his] brothers and sisters". Vice President Álvaro García Linera also resigned after consulting with Morales.

Shortly thereafter, it was reported that Morales was on a plane to Argentina; however, the Argentine foreign minister, Jorge Faurie, said that Argentina would not grant him asylum. Commander Yuri Calderón assured that there was no warrant for Morales's arrest, though armed individuals had entered his home.

Later in the day, Adriana Salvatierra, the President of the Senate, Victor Borda, the leader of the Chamber, and Rubén Medinaceli, First Vice President of the Senate, also resigned. Mexico's foreign minister declared that twenty members of Bolivia's executive and legislative branches were at the official Mexican residence in the capital seeking asylum following the resignation. Following the resignation of Morales and his allied successors, protesters called for a board to be convened to oversee the government and new elections, though Mesa disagreed with the proposal, stating protesters should not "violate the Constitution so as not to give Evo Morales an excuse that he was the victim of a coup d'etat" and that the Legislative Assembly should determine the constitutional successor.

Later on 10 November, BBC Mundo published an article suggesting that five main reasons combined to force Morales to resign: the disputed OAS audit results, the opposition from the military and police, the ongoing protests, the growing radicalization of the political opposition, and public opposition towards Morales's move to end term-limits.

In August 2020, Morales would publish his memoirs book, titled Volveremos y seremos millones (We'll come back, and we'll be millions), in which he describes that he took the decision to resign the night before November 10, and before the suggestions by the police and military.

=== OEP detentions and TSE arrests ===
At 8:20 pm, the Associated Press reported that Bolivian police had detained 38 members of the Plurinational Electoral Organ (or Órgano Electoral Plurinacional (OEP)) on suspicion of falsification and other electoral crimes, including the former president and vice president of the Supreme Electoral Tribunal (TSE), Maria Eugenia Choque and Antonio Costas. According to police commander Yuri Calderón, Choque was apprehended whilst disguised as a man. The attorney general's office earlier announced that it was opening an investigation into allegations raised by the OAS report. An election official in Santa Cruz, Sandra Kettels, was arrested Monday morning, with arrest warrants issued for the remaining TSE officials.

== Succession of presidency ==
=== Assumption of presidency by Jeanine Áñez ===
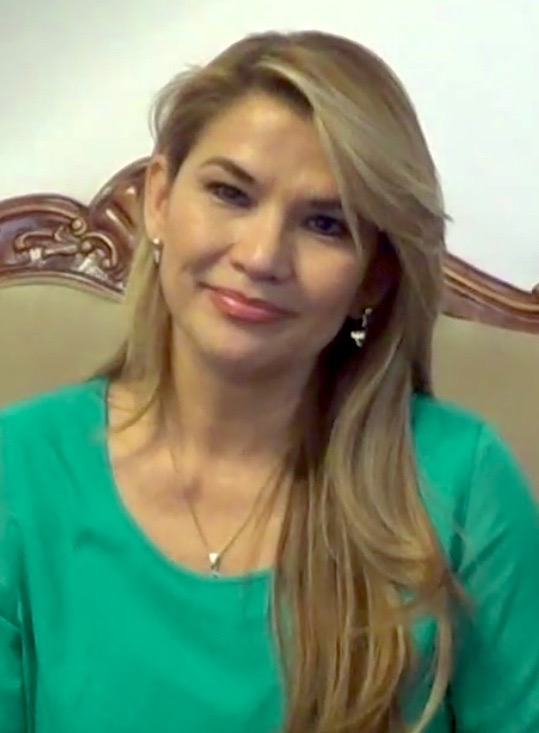
Jeanine Áñez in 2016

On the evening of 10 November, Jeanine Áñez, the second vice president of the Senate and highest-ranking official remaining, proclaimed herself President of the Senate following the resignation of the previous Senate president Adriana Salvatierra and the first vice president of the Senate Rubén Medinaceli. Moments later, Áñez declared herself President of Bolivia, claiming constitutional succession. She announced she would be assuming the presidency on an interim basis from 11 November onward, with the responsibility of calling new elections. She stated that she would assume the office once the Senate had formally recognized the previous day's resignations. Upon inauguration, Áñez would officially become the President of Bolivia.

The Bolivian Constitution had no provisions that would have allowed Áñez, as second vice president of the Senate, to legitimately succeed to the Presidency. Article 169 says that "In case of impediment or definitive absence of the president of the State, he will be replaced in office by the Vice President and, in his absence, by the President of the Senate, and in the absence of this by the President of the Chamber of Deputies. In the latter case, new elections will be called within a maximum period of ninety days." It also establishes the line of succession, which did not include Áñez.

The following day, Áñez arrived at La Paz-El Alto airport and was taken in a military helicopter to a nearby Air Force base; from here she traveled in convoy to the Senate.

On 12 November, despite lacking a quorum after Morales' Movement for Socialism (MAS) party boycotted the vote, Áñez declared herself as acting president of Bolivia while holding a large bible, proclaiming that "the bible has returned to the government palace". While she obtained the votes of the opposition parties, the absence of MAS meant only one-third of the parliament supported her elevation to the presidency.

Áñez's assumption of the presidential office was supported by Bolivia's Plurinational Constitutional Tribunal, which interpreted, citing articles referring to the presidential succession of the 2001 Constitutional Declaration, that the next person in the succession line assumes the presidency ipso facto despite not having the required quorum, stating that "the functioning of the executive should not be suspended".

=== Reactions and anti-Áñez protests ===
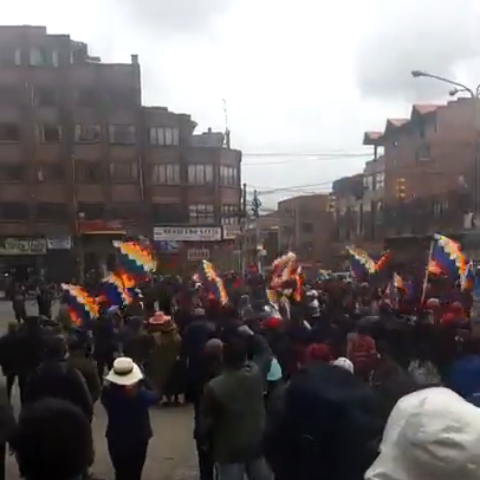
A demonstration in support of Morales in El Alto on 11 November 2019

Reactions to the transfer of power and to Ms Áñez's assumption of the presidency have been mixed, being met with both celebrations and protests. Demonstrators celebrating the removal of the government chanted "Yes, we can!" and set off fireworks. Hundreds of supporters of Morales made their way toward the center of La Paz from the mountains surrounding the city, some of them armed with sticks, chanting "Here we go, civil war!".

The police claimed that Morales supporters had vandalized police offices, inciting panic in some neighborhoods where people blocked their doors with furniture to protect stores and houses. After receiving requests for help from the national police and politicians, the armed forces announced that night they would mobilize to defend gas, water and electricity services around the capital, and also begin joint patrols with the police around the city.

On 13 November, a dozen MAS senators were blocked by police from entering the National Assembly building during the session.

The next few days were marked by protests and roadblocks on behalf of Morales's supporters. In Senkata and Sacaba, at least 19 pro-Morales protesters were killed in clashes with security forces in what was denounced as a massacre.

On 20 November, Evo Morales offered not to run for reelection if he was allowed to return to Bolivia and finish his presidential term.

==== Seat of Government shut down ====
The drinking water supplies to parts of both La Paz and El Alto, the second and third largest cities in Bolivia, were cut off. According to Gen. Williams Kaliman, it was the plan of insurgents to leave these cities without water or fuel and counteractions to guard public services were covered under the so-called "Sebastián Pagador" plan.

La Paz's legislature forced the seat of government's infrastructure, schools, and workplaces to close, claiming this was for reasons of public safety. Supporters of Morales also built barricades on roads that lead to the airport.

Barricades were placed around the Senkata refinery in El Alto by Morales supporters, cutting power and fuel to El Alto and La Paz. Pro-Morales demonstrators entered the refinery and set fire to vehicles within the compound. The Bolivian military launched a violent invasion of the site on 19 November using armored vehicles and helicopters, killing three protesters and injuring 22 in the process.

As a result of blockades from various protests surrounding the city, some goods were also not able to enter. Food supply was affected, leading to rationing and controlled prices in El Alto and La Paz.

=== Interim government response to protests ===
In the face of protests against the interim government, Áñez called for police to suppress the protests and maintain order and, on 14 November, issued a decree that would exempt the military from any type of criminal responsibility for killing or injuring protestors, when acting in a "legitimate defense or state of necessity". On 15 November, security forces fired upon coca farmers peacefully protesting against the government in Cochabamba. The massacre left nine dead and dozens injured.

==== Human rights concerns ====
José Miguel Vivanco, head of Human Rights Watch in the Americas, said that the decree "sends a very dangerous message to the military that they have carte blanche to commit abuses". The Inter-American Commission on Human Rights (IACHR) condemned Áñez's government for issuing the decree.

UN Human Rights Chief Michelle Bachelet issued a statement, saying that "while earlier deaths mostly resulted from clashes between rival protestors", the latest incidents appear to be due to the "disproportionate use of force by the army and police", stating that "in a situation like this, repressive actions by the authorities will simply stoke that anger even further and are likely to jeopardise any possible avenue for dialogue." Bachelet also expressed concern that "widespread arrests and detentions" were adding to the tensions; according to her office, more than 600 people had been detained since 21 October. Furthermore, Bachelet also declared being concerned that the situation could "spin out of control if the authorities do not handle it sensitively and in accordance with international norms and standards governing the use of force, and with full respect for human rights", stating that it couldn't be solved through "force and repression". The decree was later repealed by Áñez.

The Inter-American Commission on Human Rights expressed concerns over human rights violations that occurred after the 2019 Bolivian general election. Paulo Abrão, who heads the IACHR, declared that due to the "massive" number of human rights violations amid post-election violence, the country may need outside help to investigate the situation and recommended Bolivia coordinate with an international panel of experts to ensure findings are seen as credible. On 5 December 2019, Áñez approved an act to provide compensation to the families of those killed and injured during the conflict. On 10 December, the government and IACHR signed an agreement to investigate the acts of violence that occurred. On 30 Dec, Eva Copa, MAS head of the Senate, stated that a report had been filed with Arturo Murillo to give an account of the deaths in Sacaba and Senkata after the Assembly recess in the new year.

On 29 October 2020, the outgoing parliament approved a report on the "massacres of Senkata, Sacaba and Yapacani, which recommends a judgment of responsibility against Jeanine Anez for genocide and other offenses". Parliament also approved the criminal indictment of 11 of Anez' ministers.

On 17 August 2021, the human rights watchdog of the Organization of American States published their report on human rights during the Áñez administration. It observed that the interim government had come to power by sidestepping the constitutional rules for presidential succession, but stopped short of calling it a coup. The report documented the persecution of opponents with "systematic torture" and "summary executions", such as the use of lethal ammunition to suppress peaceful street protests by unarmed supporters of Morales.

==== Foreign participation ====
In July 2021, the Bolivian government accused Mauricio Macri's government in Argentina of having supplied arms used in the Senkata and Sacaba massacres. Bolivian Foreign Minister Rogelio Mayta said air force chief General Jorge Gonzalo Terceros had written a letter on 13 November 2019 thanking Argentinian ambassador Normando Alvarez Garcia for the delivery of 40,000 bullets, tear gas canisters and grenades. The Ecuadorian government of Lenin Moreno offered military aid to Bolivia in the same period. Gonzalo Terceros accused the letter of being a forgery, made with a signature not his own and at a point when he had resigned, and the former chancellor Karen Longaric pointed that the date in the letter would mean that the alleged shipment was prepared and sent when Morales was still president. Longaric also pointed that, although the letter describes the shipment as war weapons, they are actually police weapons, whose trade is not illegal. Terceros' lawyer pointed as well that his client belonged to the air force, who had no business trading anti-riot materials.

An investigation carried out by the Argentine Government shows records of the exit of firearms, ammunition, bulletproof vests, pepper spray, and hand grenades of harassment gas, among other materials. The Bolivian Police confirmed they found part of the material sent, which had no associated documentation. Minister of Justice and Human Rights of Argentina Martín Soria said this would suggest the destination was not the Argentine Embassy as previously claimed.

== Interim government activities ==
=== New elections ===
Áñez stated on 15 November that in order to restore faith in the electoral process, a vote would first be held to elect a new Electoral Commission, before having a new vote for president.

On 20 November the interim government presented a bill that aimed to forge a path to new elections. The two chambers congress were expected to debate the bill which would annul 20 October election and appoint a new electoral board within 15 days of its passage, paving the way for a new vote. The bill, drafted jointly by MAS and anti-Morales legislators, was approved on 23 November; it also prohibited Morales from participating in the fresh election. In exchange, Áñez's government agreed to withdraw the armed forces from all protest areas (although some servicemen were still permitted to stay at some state companies to "prevent vandalism"), revoke her decree which granted the army immunity from criminal prosecution, release arrested protesters, protect lawmakers and social leaders from attacks and provide compensation for the families of those killed during the crisis. She approved the bill shortly thereafter.

Elections were initially scheduled to be held on 3 May 2020. However, they were postponed due to the COVID-19 pandemic.

On 22 June 2020, Áñez approved a law passed by both the Chamber of Deputies and the Senate to set a date for the election for 6 September 2020, with elected authorities in place by mid-to-late November 2020.

On 23 July 2020, the TSE postponed the election to 18 October 2020 due to medical reports that the pandemic will have its highest peaks in late August and early September. Many opposition leaders, including Evo Morales, have condemned the delays, seeing the continued delays as an unconstitutional attempt to remain in power, and some groups, including the Bolivian Workers' Center have planned protests.

=== Domestic policy ===
Immediately after his resignation, protests emerged in support of Morales and against the new government. In response, Áñez signed decree no. 4078, granting total impunity to the armed forces to quell protestors, resulting in the massacres of Senkata and Sacaba, where at least 18 people were killed by the military. This decree was subject to international criticism. José Miguel Vivanco, Americas Director of Human Rights Watch described the decree as, "giv[ing] the armed forces a blank check to commit abuses instead of working to restore the rule of law in the country".

The Áñez administration appointed government ministers between 13 and 18 November. The first eleven members of the interim cabinet, appointed 13 November, did not contain any indigenous members. The Guardian described this partial cabinet as showing "no signs that [Áñez] intended to reach across the country's deep political and ethnic divide". Áñez did, however, designate two persons of indigenous origin as ministers of culture and mining as the remaining positions were filled. Morales's first cabinet was majority indigenous (14 out of 16 positions), though this number decreased over the course of his tenure as president. Among the senior ministers in Áñez' cabinet were prominent Bolivian businesspeople. Shortly after taking office, Áñez also appointed a new military high command. The new commander of the armed forces, General Carlos Orellana Centellas, pledged to take orders from Áñez.

On 20 November, Áñez granted safe-conduct to Evo Morales's daughter, Evaliz, to receive political asylum in Mexico.

The government renamed the state newspaper, known as Cambio under president Morales, as Bolivia on 17 November. On 25 November, the Áñez met with civil groups Bolivian Workers' Center, the country's largest union, and the Pact of Unity, a prominent indigenous grassroots group, to sign agreements on how to pacify Bolivia following previous violent events.

In the week following the inauguration of Áñez, the new government came under heavy criticism from a variety of sources. The New York Times described Áñez as "reaching beyond her caretaker mandate of organizing national elections by January". Javier Corrales, a Latin American politics professor at Amherst College in Massachusetts, said "without a popular mandate, [the government] are pushing forward some of the most objectionable aspects of their agenda". Oliver Stuenkel, associate professor of international relations at the Getúlio Vargas Foundation in São Paulo, said that "the only thing this government was supposed to do was calm things down and call elections, and that's just about the only thing it has not done".

By late November and December, some progress was made in passing legislation for new elections, appointing a new electoral body, entering dialogue with representatives from protesting factions in El Alto and cooperating with Morales's MAS party in joint participation in the coming elections, albeit without Morales as a presidential candidate. A survey by Bolivian newspaper Página Siete showed that 43% of Bolivians approved of how Áñez has handled the presidency, while 23% disapproved. On 13 Dec, Áñez approved an agreement between the three main parties over a so-called "Law of Guarantees" formulated to restore faith among political actors in the process of moving forward, including reparations for those killed and injured by her government. This act was welcomed by the Secretary General of the UN. A previous incarnation of this legislation, passed in both chambers by the MAS majority, had not been given presidential approval due to articles that implied immunity from prosecution for representatives of the previous government. This version was described by opposition lawmakers as an attempted "cover up" on behalf of the MAS party and caused friction among members of MAS itself.

On 1 January 2020, Áñez presented a change in the law that would it make it mandatory for presidential candidates to engage in public debate with their opponents to support "the strengthening of informed democracy". La Razón says such debates did not take place before.

In September 2020, Human Rights Watch released a report saying that the interim caretaker government is "abusing the justice system to wage a politically motivated witch-hunt against former president Evo Morales and his allies", adding that prosecutors had charged some Morales backers with terrorism for simply speaking to him on the phone.

=== Foreign policy ===
Karen Longaric, appointed as foreign minister by Jeanine Áñez, announced the formal departure from the country of the Bolivarian Alliance for the Peoples of Our America (ALBA) and breaking all diplomatic relations with Venezuela's Maduro government, recognizing Juan Guaidó as acting president of Venezuela in the Venezuelan presidential crisis. Longaric also announced that the interim government was considering leaving the Union of South American Nations (UNASUR).

A month later, the country announced its entry into the Lima Group, a regional bloc established in 2017 with the purpose of finding a way out of the Venezuelan crisis. The Bolivian foreign ministry said in a statement that it hoped to "contribute to a peaceful, democratic and constitutional solution to the crisis in Venezuela, which must be guided by the Venezuelan people". On the same month, the interim government announced that they would give refuge to 200 Venezuelans "who have fled their country for reasons of political order, of political persecution promoted by the Nicolás Maduro government".

In January 2020, the interim government suspended relations with Cuba in response to remarks made by Foreign Minister Bruno Rodríguez Parrilla, who called Áñez a "liar", "coupist" and "self-proclaimed" in reference to her latest statements about the role of Cuban medical doctors in the country.

==== Diplomatic row over Mexican embassy ====
Since the resignation of Morales, several members of the past administration have taken diplomatic refuge in the Mexican Embassy in La Paz. Several of them faced accusations and prosecution under the interim government, the most senior being the former Minister of the Presidency, Juan Ramón Quintana. Anti-Morales protesters routinely gathered at the doorstep of the Embassy to voice their discontent and demand that they be turned over to the Bolivian authorities. An increased security presence by police and army in the vicinity of the Embassy led to accusations of harassment and a "siege". On 27 December, tensions were further increased when visiting Spanish diplomats were stopped by police during a visit to the Embassy. The Mexican ambassador accused the Bolivian government of María Teresa Mercado violating the Vienna Convention. Longaric responded by saying the presence of masked and armed guards aroused suspicion that there would be an attempt to smuggle Quintana from the Embassy to another location. Longaric said: "No country in the world could tolerate what happened last Friday. In that case, the Vienna Convention empowers the host State to declare those diplomats who violate the rules of the conventions themselves personas non-gratas." On 30 December, Áñez made an announcement giving a number of Mexican and Spanish diplomats 72 hours to leave the country; Spain responding by declaring that three Bolivian diplomats likewise must leave the country. Eva Copa, MAS head of the Senate, criticised Áñez for the expulsion of diplomats of countries who helped bring stability to Bolivia and urged her to reconsider the action.

=== Counteractions ===
On 15 November, Longaric expelled 725 Cuban citizens, mostly medical doctors, after accusing them of being involved in protests. The government announced it arrested nine Venezuelans in the border city of Guayaramerín (near Brazil) with boots and insignias of the Bolivarian National Police (PNB), identification cards of the United Socialist Party of Venezuela (PSUV) and microchips containing photos of themselves with other people armed with guns. After the arrest and the discovery of the microchips, the interim government accused the men of participating in "violent acts" in the country, and transferred them to the Bolivian Special Crime Fighting Forces to conduct a preliminary investigation.

Arturo Murillo, Áñez's new interior minister, vowed to "hunt down" his predecessor Juan Ramón Quintana, a prominent Morales ally, stoking fears of a vendetta against members of the previous administration. He later announced he would start arresting certain members of the previous government who he accused of "subversion". Roxana Lizárraga, Áñez's communication minister, stated that she had a list of journalists who were "involved in sedition" and threatened them with prosecution.

On 22 November, after an audio recording, allegedly of Morales, leaked in which Morales supporters were directed to block main roads to La Paz, the interim government opened an investigation into Morales for "terrorism and sedition". Hours later, the vice-president of MAS-IPSP was arrested for allegedly using a car of the ministry of the President; in the car, according to Télam, police discovered computers and biometric devices that belonged to the electoral commission.

=== Social media campaign ===
In December 2019, the interim government of Áñez contracted CLS Strategies, a Washington-based public relations firm, "to carry out lobbying in support of Bolivian democracy" and "in support of holding new presidential elections". In September 2020, Facebook closed 55 accounts, 42 pages and 36 Instagram accounts linked to CLS Strategies. Facebook said these were fake accounts used to secretly manipulate politics in Bolivia, Venezuela and Mexico in violation of Facebook's prohibition on foreign interference. CLS Strategies stated at the time that they “take very seriously the issues raised by Facebook and others.” They also claimed to have hired an outside law firm for an internal investigation, and have placed the head of their Latin American practice on leave.

Following Morales's resignation, a large anti-Morales Twitter bot network was uncovered by the microblogging site in mid November. The network had published automated tweets which declared opposition to Morales, further adding that the events were "not a coup". Compared to the extremely low proportion of the population that speaks English, the abundance of English tweets from this network suggests that it was intended to sway opinions beyond Bolivia. The company behind the site had removed many of the tweets by 19 November, but media reports suggested that around 4200 were still up by that point. A study by Julian Macias Tovar, head of social networks for the Spanish party Podemos, found that nearly 70,000 fake accounts had been used by the network, many of which were created just days before. Tovar said that fake accounts were used to artificially boost the online following of anti-Morales political figures, including Añez.

An investigation by The Guardian in 2021 found that Facebook was slow to remove fake accounts and pages in Bolivia when notified of their existence. A network of fake accounts supporting a candidate during the October 2019 election were still operating in September 2020. In general, Facebook "allowed major abuses of its platform in poor, small and non-western countries in order to prioritise addressing abuses that attract media attention or affect the US and other wealthy countries".

=== Handling of COVID-19 pandemic ===
In May 2020, Health Minister Marcelo Navajas was arrested on suspicion of corruption related to a scheme to buy ventilators for the treatment of COVID-19. The ventilators were purchased from a Spanish company for around twice their value. Intensive care doctors said that the ventilators were not suitable for Bolivian intensive care units. In August 2020, a report in the New York Times said the death rate in Bolivia was "nearly five times the official tally" and that testing was very limited. It said that Bolivia was one of the worst affected countries and calculated that Bolivia had five times as many deaths in July as in previous years. Writing in the New York Times in September 2020, Diego von Vacano, who is an expert in Latin America, said Añez' interim government had mismanaged the COVID-19 crisis.

== Reactions ==
Following Morales' resignation, there was a debate within and beyond Bolivia over whether it constituted a coup.

Many national governments and intergovernmental organizations issued statements urging Bolivia's politicians to show restraint and to hold fresh elections. Some national leaders' reactions were divided along ideological lines. Several Latin American left-wing politicians, including Nicolás Maduro, Alberto Fernández and Miguel Díaz-Canel condemned Morales' forced resignation, calling it a coup. Others, particularly right-wing populists such as Jair Bolsonaro and Donald Trump, celebrated it.

On 4 December 2019, the Organization of American States (OAS) released its final report on the 20 October election, detailing what they called "deliberate" and "malicious" tactics to rig it in favor of President Morales. The left-leaning US think tank Center for Economic and Policy Research rejected the OAS statistical analysis of election data, arguing that a basic coding error resulted in inexplicable changes in trend. A later report commissioned by the OAS in 2021 noted that Añez's path to power was also accompanied by "irregularities" and serious human rights abuses by security forces.

== See also ==
- Evo Morales grounding incident
- 2008 unrest in Bolivia
- Venezuelan presidential crisis
