= Senkata and Sacaba massacres =

Bolivian massacres of protesters

The Senkata and Sacaba massacres were two incidents of political violence in Bolivia under the presidency of Jeanine Áñez:

- Sacaba massacre on November 15, 2019
- Senkata massacre on November 19, 2019
