= Víctor Borda =

Bolivian lawyer and politician

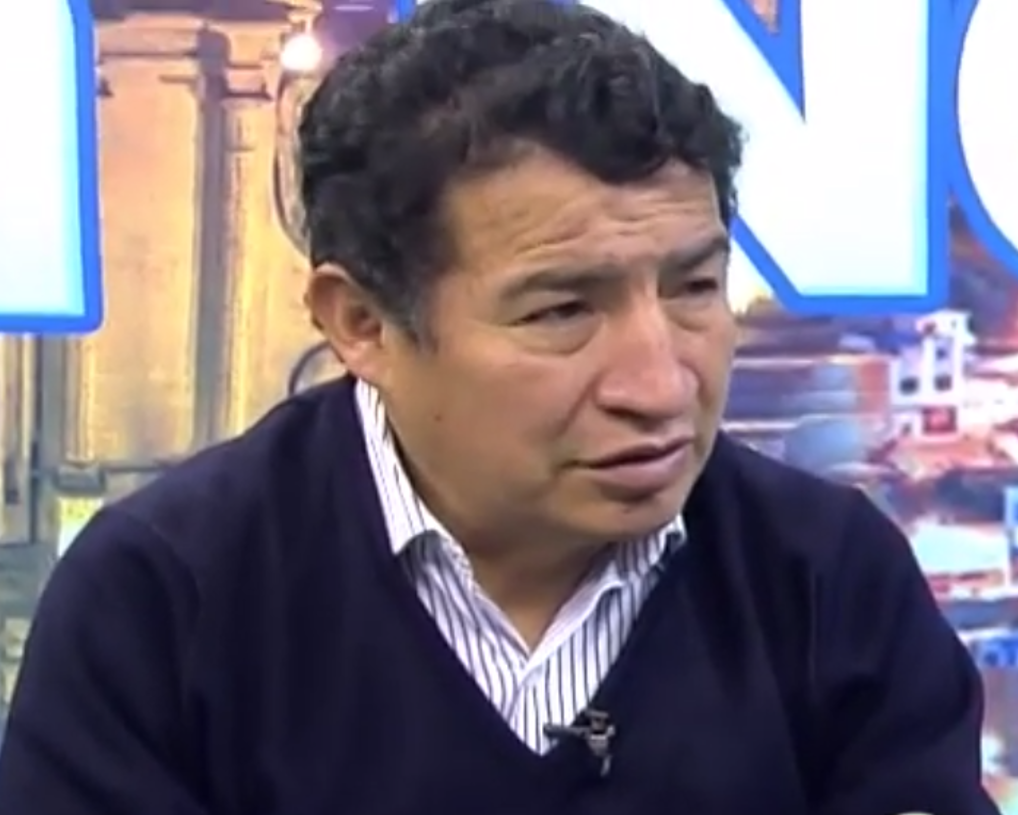
- Borda in 2019

President of the Chamber of Deputies of Bolivia
- In office January 18, 2019 – November 10, 2019
- President: Evo Morales
- Vice President: Álvaro García Linera
- Preceded by: Gabriela Montaño
- Succeeded by: Susana Rivero

Personal details
- Born: Víctor Ezequiel Borda Belzu; June 2, 1970 (age 56) Potosí
- Party: MAS-IPSP
- Occupation: Politician, lawyer

Víctor Ezequiel Borda Belzu (born June 12, 1970) is a Bolivian lawyer and politician. He was President of the Chamber of Deputies of Bolivia from January 2019 until his resignation on November 10, 2019, due to the political crisis in Bolivia. He is a deputy for the 34th constituency of the Movement for Socialism in the Potosí Department.

== Early life ==
Borda was born on 12 June 1970, in Potosí. He began his primary studies in 1976, leaving high school in his hometown in 1987.

== Political career ==
He was a member of the Constituent Assembly, and served as an executive in both the University Confederation of Bolivia and the Local University Federation. He was head of the Movement for Socialism (MAS) bench in Deputies.

In January 2019 he was elected president of the Chamber of Deputies for the period 2019–2020 succeeding Gabriela Montaño.

On 9 April, he assumed the presidency of Bolivia on an interim basis for 24 hours when Evo Morales was visiting Asia.

On 9 November 2019, a group of people in the city of Potosí set fire to his home as reprisal of the Potosí-Oruro highway attacks against miners by MAS supporters. The following day, on 10 November 2019, he announced his resignation to the Presidency of the Chamber of Deputies after his brother was taken hostage in Potosí, urging that the life of his brother be respected, who would have been taken hostage. He was replaced by Susana Rivero, who on 12 November took refuge at the Mexican embassy in La Paz but had not submitted her resignation.
