= Miraflores Women's Penitentiary Center =

Women's prison in La Paz

Coordinates: 16.5010°S 68.1190°W

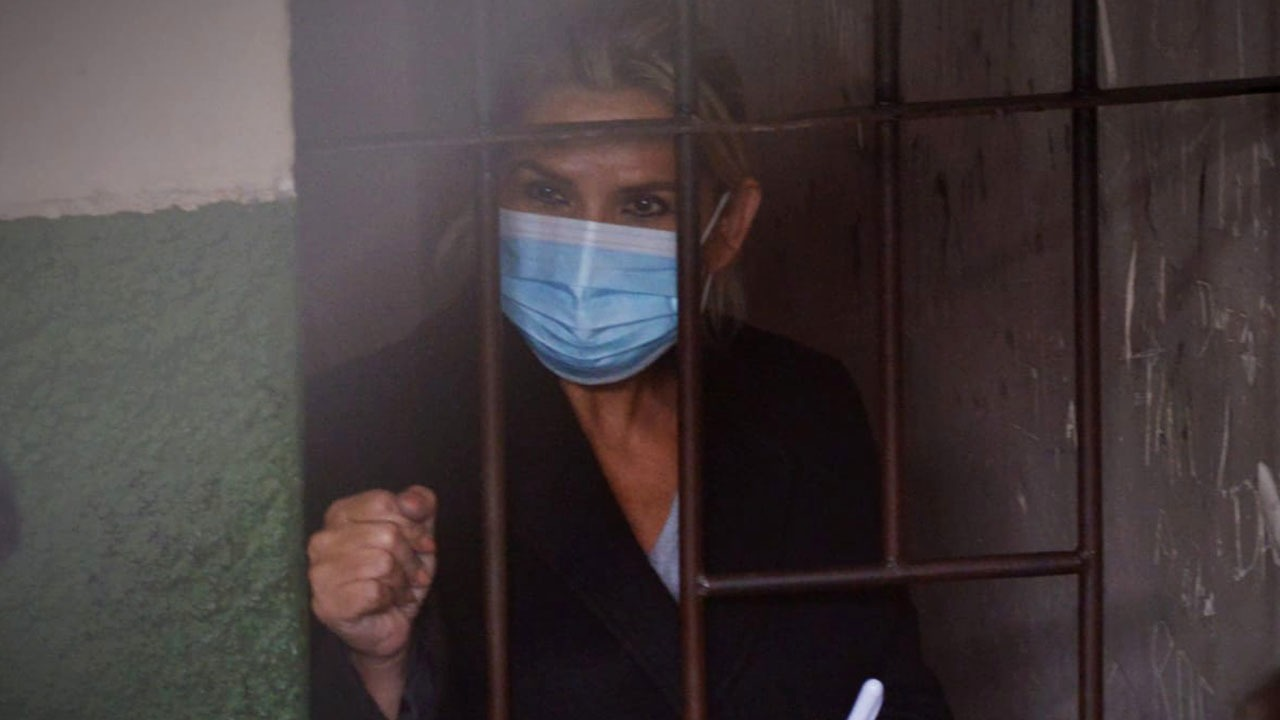
Jeanine Áñez at the Miraflores Women's Penitentiary in March 2021

The Miraflores Women's Penitentiary Center (Spanish: Centro Penitenciario Femenino de Miraflores) is a women's prison in the Miraflores district of La Paz, Bolivia. The facility is a high security prison nominally created to hold forty inmates, although it holds many more, with some incarcerated women housing children with them.

British anthropologist Alison Spedding—who was incarcerated there for some time—described conditions at the prison as spartan, overseen by staff of both sexes wearing military uniform, but that illegal drugs were less available than at other prisons.

Former Bolivian president Jeanine Áñez was held in preventive detention there from 2021 to 2022. She has claimed to have suffered torture and abuse in the prison. Following the imposition of a ten-year prison sentence, she is to serve the rest of her prison term there. Other inmates have complained about what they see as privileged treatment for Áñez, seeking equal treatment for themselves.

== See also ==
- San Pedro prison
