= 2021 Beni gubernatorial election =

Bolivian election

← 2015	7 March 2021	2025 →
- Opinion polls
- Registered: 275,795
- Turnout: 83.03% (▲2.95 pp)

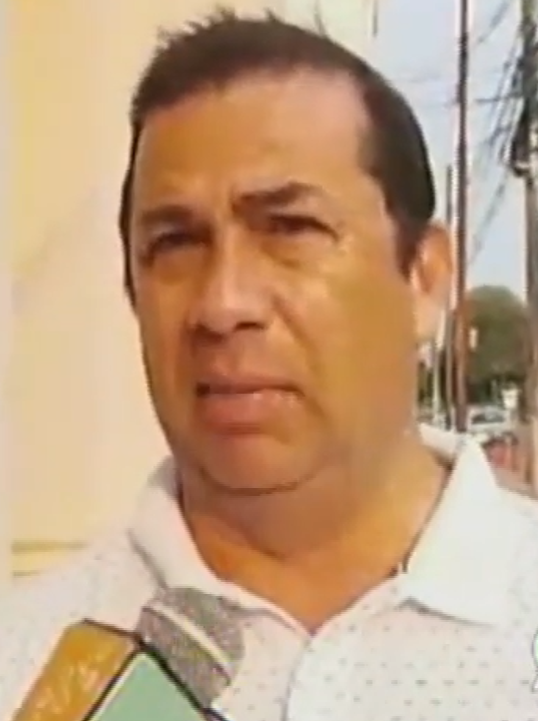

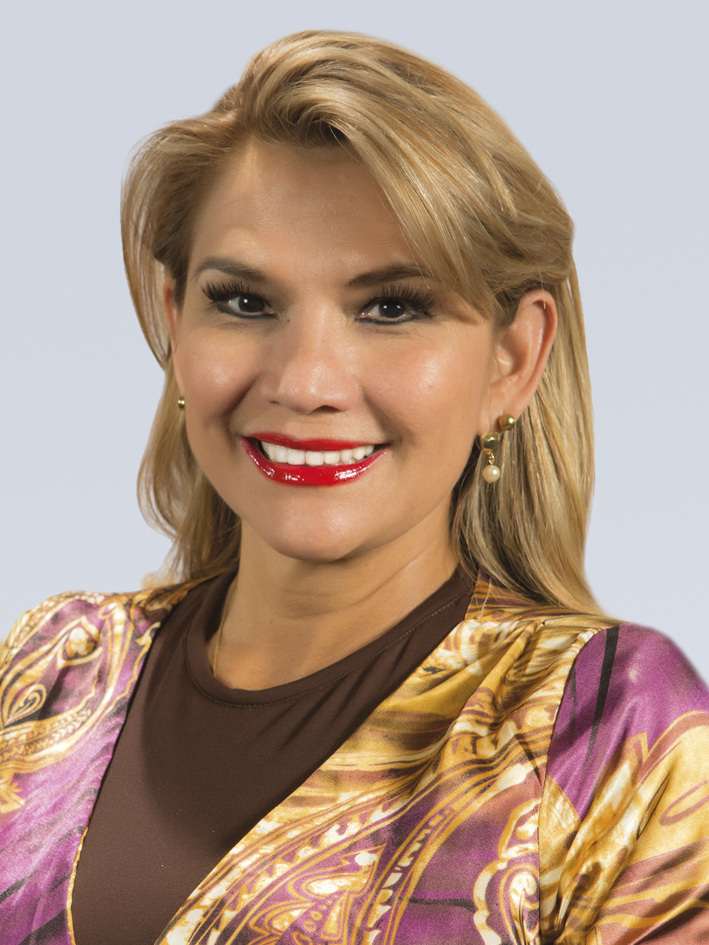

Candidate	Alejandro Unzueta	Alex Ferrier
Party	BUSCO	MAS-IPSP
Alliance	MTS	—
Popular vote	83,732	44,494
Percentage	41.79%	22.21%
Candidate	Jeanine Áñez	Fernando Aponte
Party	Independent	MDS
Alliance	Ahora! (Note: Coalition consisting of Hagámoslo por Trinidad and UN.)	TODOS (Note: Coalition consisting of MDS and MNR.)
Popular vote	26,620	24,149
Percentage	13.29%	12.05%
Governor before election
Fanor Amapo (acting)
MAS-IPSP
Governor after election
Alejandro Unzueta
MTS

The 2021 Beni gubernatorial election was held on Sunday, 7 March 2021, to elect the governor of Beni, Bolivia. Alex Ferrier, the incumbent governor after the 2015 gubernatorial election but who resigned during the 2019 political crisis, ran to return to office for a second term. He was defeated by Alejandro Unzueta, who received a popular vote plurality of 41.79 percent—a margin of more than forty percent plus ten percent above the next closes competitor—allowing for a first-round victory without the need for a runoff.

== History ==
=== Background ===
In the 2015 gubernatorial election, the Movement for Socialism (MAS-IPSP) and its candidate, Alex Ferrier, narrowly won the Beni governorship in the second round by a margin of 50.23 percent of the popular vote to his competitor's 49.77 percent. Four years later, amid the political crisis the country faced in 2019, Ferrier announced his resignation from office on 10 November to "help pacify the country". Assemblyman Fanor Amapo of the MAS was subsequently appointed acting governor by the Departmental Legislative Assembly. Shortly thereafter, allegations of corruption and disputes over health policy led the legislature to depose Amapo. On 12 July 2020, it voted to remove him from office and elected Yáscara Moreno as Beni's first female governor. Just thirty-six days later, however, the Departmental Court of Justice of Beni overturned that decision, reinstating Amapo as governor.

=== Political groups and campaigns ===
==== Third System Movement ====
The first to launch their gubernatorial candidacy was Alejandro Unzueta on 18 November 2020. Unzueta, a dentist, was a political outsider who gained notoriety during the early COVID-19 pandemic when he toured the cities and towns of Beni—the hardest-hit department at the time—distributing free medicine and providing instruction on methods to combat the disease. During this time, he was sued by several departmental medical institutions for prescribing medications "without scientific or professional endorsement", given that he was a dentist and not a doctor. Nonetheless, the populace widely accepted the treatments he promoted, garnering him widespread acclaim in the department.

Unzueta's candidacy was facilitated through Beni a Single Heart (BUSCO), a minor civic group with whose representatives he sought to attain legal status with the Departmental Electoral Tribunal (TED). At the same time, Unzueta also sought to ally himself with a more prominent political front in order to bolster his candidacy. In that regard, he initially received support from social organizations related to the MAS, but the party's leadership rejected the idea. Instead, he opted to seal an alliance with the Third System Movement (MTS) of La Paz Governor Félix Patzi, which agreed to nominate him as the party's candidate. The agreement between Unzueta and the MTS was noted for being largely instrumental, especially as Unzueta had barely met with its main leader; his campaign operated practically independently, not consulting or following party guidelines.

When polling firm Ciesmori released its first nationwide survey results in late January 2021, the Santa Cruz daily El Deber described Unzueta as the "biggest surprise in the polls". Despite his lack of previous political experience, Ciesmori's poll indicated a twenty-seven percent voting intention for Unzueta, surpassing former high-level authorities. Unzueta described the results as a "miracle from God".

Nearing the first round of the election, Unzueta faced the possible disqualification of his candidacy by the TED. The request for his disqualification related to a ruling issued by the Plurinational Constitutional Court, which affirmed that all qualifying candidates must have fulfilled a mandated residency requirement of two years in the region in which they were running. Unzueta's detractors assured that he did not meet this requirement as he did not primarily reside in Beni. While Unzueta admitted that he spent weekdays at his clinic in Santa Cruz, he assured that his primary residence, as well as his cattle ranch, were both located in Beni. On 2 March, five days before the election, the TED ruled that the suit against him was unproven, allowing him to continue in the race.

==== Movement for Socialism ====
Within the Movement for Socialism, pre-candidates seeking the nomination are analyzed and elected by party leaders in conjunction with regional social organizations. Three pre-candidates were put forward for consideration: incumbent governor Fanor Amapo, former governor Alex Ferrier, and Yanine Bravo. Amapo's primary base of support was among Beni's indigenous sector; his pre-candidacy was presented by the Center of Indigenous Peoples of Beni and the Center of Indigenous Women of Beni. Meanwhile, Ferrier maintained the support of the MAS' youth wing and the party's regional and provincial directives. Finally, Bravo was put forward by the construction sector.

Ultimately, Ferrier won the nomination, though not without discontent from supporters of Amapo, who demanded that he be the candidate instead. Ferrier's close ties to party leader Evo Morales led opponents to assert that his candidacy had been imposed on the MAS by the former president. In protest of Ferrier's nomination, Amapo's supporters installed a vigil outside the TED's offices, forcing regional authorities to cordon off its entrance to prevent their interference in the registration process. The registration of Ferrier's candidacy nearly missed its deadline when the MAS delegate sent to deliver the documentation was grabbed by a group of Amapo's supporters. However, the situation did not escalate, and the MAS was successfully able to register Ferrier as its nominee.

==== Ahora! ====
Of the candidates with the most nationwide recognition was Jeanine Áñez. Áñez held a long political history in the Beni Department, entering politics as a member of the Constituent Assembly before representing the entire department as senator for two terms between 2010 and 2014 and 2015 and 2019. Áñez's 2021 campaign was not her first gubernatorial bid; the defunct National Convergence alliance presented her as a pre-candidate for the 2013 Beni special gubernatorial election, though she failed to receive the nomination. Up until two months before launching her candidacy, Áñez had served as the country's interim president, overseeing the year-long transition between the resignation of President Evo Morales in 2019 and the holding of new elections in 2020.

Logo of the political alliance Ahora!

On 28 December 2020, party spokesman Jorge Ribera revealed that Áñez had agreed to run as a candidate for governor of the Beni Department on behalf of Ahora!, an alliance between the National Unity Front (UN) and Let's do it for Trinidad. He stated that the decision to nominate her stemmed from a recently conducted internal poll that indicated favorable results if she ran. The following day, Áñez officially launched her gubernatorial candidacy. At a press conference, she recalled that she had been debating whether to assume that "former president's role" and withdraw from politics or accept UN's invitation to be its nominee and that she opted for the latter in order to fulfill her commitment "to work for my department".

Áñez's electoral program focused on developing the department's agriculture industry and implementing a "Beni Bonus" to help families struggling in the pandemic. Polling indicated relatively even support between her and Unzueta, with each receiving twenty-one and twenty-seven percent of the voting intention; such an outcome would result in a runoff between the two. However, her campaign was disrupted by mounting judicial processes related to her presidency, which forced her to suspend electoral activities on multiple occasions.

==== Other political organizations ====
Among the nationally registered parties known collectively as the opposition, they entered the gubernatorial election in a fractured state, having failed to consolidate a single front despite efforts in that regard. For the elections in Beni, the Civic Community alliance of Carlos Mesa agreed to allow one of its components, the Revolutionary Left Front (FRI), to consolidate a political front independently from the national coalition. The result of this was an agreement between the FRI and Creemos of Luis Fernando Camacho to form a unified alliance in the department. To this was added the Bolivian National Action Party (PAN-BOL) and the regional Building Future civic group to form the Cambiemos alliance, which presented Ruddy Destre as its candidate. On the other hand, the Social Democratic Movement and the Revolutionary Nationalist Movement opted to seal their own alliance—dubbed All United for Beni—which presented Fernando Aponte as its gubernatorial candidate.

== General election ==
=== Opinion polling ===
Pollster	Date	Unzueta	Ferrier	Áñez	Aponte	NACER (Note: Ciesmori II: Javier Chávez Ciesmori I: Benedicto Pedraza Tomicha)	Destre	Suárez	UNEBENI (Note: Ciesmori II: Jesus Alberto Rivero Ciesmori I: Julio Uzquiano)	Fabricano	None
Ciesmori	7 Mar. (Note: Exit poll.)	37.5%	22.8%	15.4%	10.7%	3.7%	3.2%	2.6%	2.3%	1.8%	N/A
Ciesmori	24 Jan.	27%	18.5%	21.7%	4.3%	0.5%	1.7%	1.9%	0.4%	1.6%	22.3% (Note: Blank/None: 5.3% Null: 0.7% Undecided: 16.3%)

=== Results ===
On 12 March 2021, the Departmental Electoral Tribunal reported that though irregularities made it necessary to repeat the vote in five precincts, they would not affect the outcome. With 99.64 percent of the total votes counted, Alejandro Unzueta was declared the virtual winner, having achieved forty-one percent of the vote to Ferrier's twenty-two percent, thus circumventing a runoff. (Note: In Bolivia, a second round is avoided by one candidate either reaching 50% of the vote or achieving a 40% plurality with 10% more votes than the next closest competitor.)

2021 Beni gubernatorial election
Candidate	Party	Votes	%
Alejandro Unzueta	Third System Movement	83,732	41.79
Alex Ferrier	Movement for Socialism	44,494	22.21
Jeanine Áñez	Ahora!	26,620	13.29
Fernando Aponte	All United for Beni	24,149	12.05
Ruddy Destre	Cambiemos (Note: Coalition consisting of Creemos, FRI, Construyendo Futuro, and PAN-BOL.)	6,616	3.30
Javier Chávez	Autonomous Nationalities	6,466	3.23
Marco Antonio Suárez	Mojeños Ethnic Peoples	4,898	2.44
Jesus Alberto Rivero	Unity and Hope for Beni	2,107	1.05
Marcial Fabricano	Front for Victory	1,280	0.64
Total		200,362	100.00
Valid votes		200,362	87.50
Invalid/blank votes		28,630	12.50
Total votes		228,992	100.00
Registered voters/turnout		275,795	83.03
Source: Plurinational Electoral Organ | Electoral Atlas
