= Carolina Ribera =

Bolivian political activist

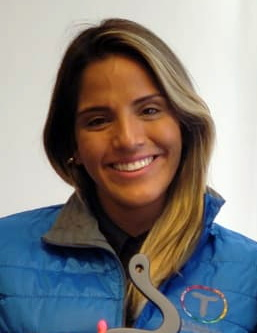

Presidential Representative in the Social Support and Management Unit
- Honorary
- In office 24 December 2019 – 8 November 2020
- President: Jeanine Áñez
- Minister: Yerko Núñez
- Preceded by: Virginia Velasco
- Succeeded by: Rolando Quisbert

Personal details
- Born: Carolina Ribera Áñez; 1 May 1990 (age 36) Trinidad, Beni, Bolivia
- Party: Social Democratic Movement (2013–2020)
- Parent(s): Tadeo Ribera; Jeanine Áñez
- Education: University of Saint Francis Xavier; José Ballivián Autonomous University of Beni; Higher University of San Simón
- Occupation: Dentist

Carolina Ribera Áñez (born 1 May 1990) is a Bolivian dentist who served as the presidential representative in the Social Support and Management Unit of the Ministry of the Presidency from 2019 to 2020 under then-President Jeanine Áñez. Ribera is the eldest daughter of Áñez and former Trinidad mayor Tadeo Ribera. Carolina has protested Áñez's incarceration on various criminal charges since 2021, denouncing alleged violations of her mother's human and legal rights.

== Early life and career ==
Carolina Ribera was born on 1 May 1990 to Tadeo Ribera and Jeanine Áñez. Ribera was raised in the field of politics; her father, Tadeo, served as mayor of their home city of Trinidad, capital of the Beni Department, from 1996 to 1999. However, it was through her mother, Jeanine Áñez, that Ribera gained an interest in politics. When Áñez was elected as a constituent in the Bolivian Constituent Assembly, Ribera moved with her mother to Sucre, where she initially chose to study dentistry at the University of Saint Francis Xavier, later returning to Trinidad to practice her career. As Áñez's political career continued, however, Ribera changed interests and began studying law at the José Ballivián Autonomous University of Beni.

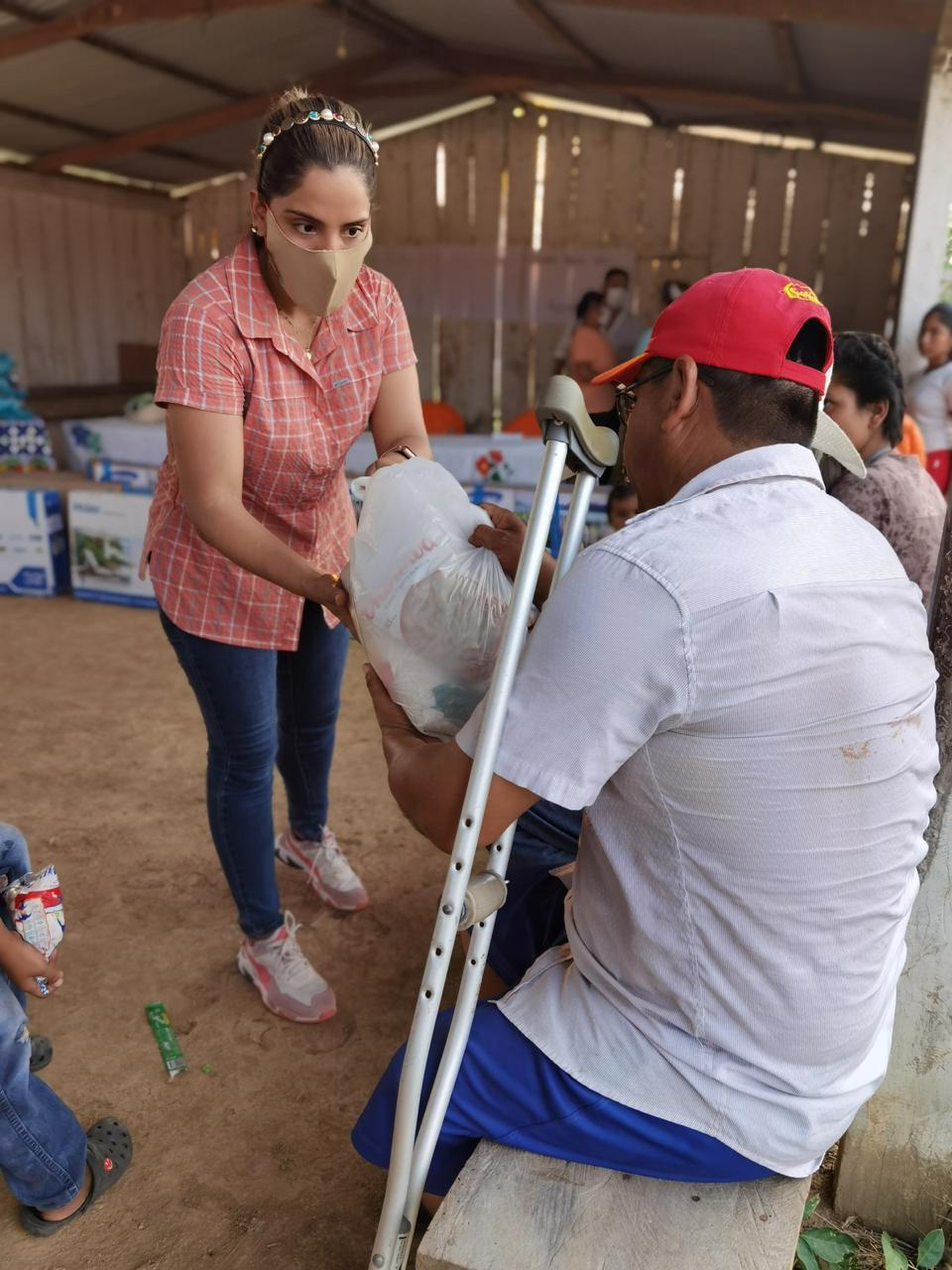
Ribera delivers humanitarian aid to a community in Beni.

Seeking to begin a political career of her own, Ribera attended the Higher University of San Simón in Cochabamba, where she graduated with a diploma in gender and political science. Additionally, through the support of the Konrad Adenauer Foundation, Ribera received political training in Colombia, Peru, and Uruguay, among other countries, and in various Bolivian institutions with which she worked. When Áñez sought reelection as a senator as a member of the Social Democratic Movement (MDS), Ribera became a leader in the party's youth wing. During this time, she supported her mother in raising awareness through various social campaigns relating to gender and health, specifically covering women's rights and oral hygiene for peri-urban youth in Beni. During the 2016 constitutional referendum, Ribera participated in the civic mobilization that succeeded in achieving the rejection of the abolishment of term limits. Her initial intent was to seek a seat on the Trinidad Municipal Council before then moving to national politics.

== Government career ==
After the ouster of President Evo Morales due to allegations of electoral fraud in his bid for a fourth term, Áñez assumed the presidency of the State through a disputed and controversial constitutional succession. Ribera accompanied her mother in moving to La Paz, serving as a de facto assistant to the president in the early days of her administration. On 24 December 2019, Áñez appointed Ribera as the presidential representative in the Social Support and Management Unit, a branch of the Ministry of the Presidency. Seeking to avoid allegations of nepotism, the government assured that Ribera's position was solely honorary, meaning she did not receive remuneration for her service. Her work focused on the coordination and development of plans, programs, projects, and activities aimed at bringing aid to individuals in vulnerable economic or social situations.

== Campaign to release Jeanine Áñez ==
Ribera's public profile increased in the wake of the arrest of Áñez on charges relating to a coup d'état that she is alleged to have committed in 2019 and ordering Sacaba massacre and Senkata massacre. During the duration of Áñez's incarceration, Ribera was a vocal proponent of her mother's right to due process and adequate medical treatment. During this time, she led multiple vigils and protests in support of Áñez and called on the international community to denounce the alleged violation of human rights suffered by her mother. On 6 November 2025, Jeanine Áñez was freed from prison after Supreme Court ruling.

Government offices
Preceded by Virginia Velasco	Presidential Representative in the Social Support and Management Unit; Honorary; 2019–2020	Succeeded by Rolando Quisbert
