= Sacaba massacre =

2019 Bolivian massacre of protesters

- Part of the 2019 Bolivian political crisis
- Location: Sacaba, Cochabamba, Bolivia
- Date: 15 November 2019; 6 years ago
- Target: Protesters
- Attack type: Massacre
- Weapon: Firearms
- Deaths: 11
- Injuries: ~98
- Perpetrators: Bolivian National Police, Armed Forces of Bolivia

The 2019 Sacaba massacre occurred when Bolivian soldiers and police attacked and broke up a protest led by Bolivian coca growers at Huayllani in Sacaba municipality, Cochabamba on 15 November 2019. It came in the first week of the interim presidency of Jeanine Áñez. Marchers intended to enter the town of Sacaba and proceed to the departmental capital of Cochabamba to protest the ousting of Bolivian president Evo Morales, but were stopped by the police and military. During the afternoon, police and soldiers clashed with protesters, and eventually soldiers opened fire on the crowd. Eleven demonstrators were killed; an estimated ninety-eight people were wounded, including four journalists and eight members of the security forces. Two hundred twenty-three protesters were arrested, many of whom suffered mistreatment and at least nine of whom were tortured.

Following the killing of another ten demonstrators and bystanders at Senkata on 19 November 2019, the pro-Morales movement entered roundtable talks with the Áñez government. The Inter-American Commission on Human Rights denounced the Sacaba events as a massacre in December 2019, and the IACHR-appointed Interdisciplinary Group of Independent Experts ratified that description in its 2021 report on human rights violations during the crisis. The massacre was also investigated and condemned by the Harvard Law School International Human Rights Clinic and the University Network for Human Rights. Former Army Col. Franz Vargas was arrested in July 2021 for his alleged responsibility for the massacre.

== Background ==
Bolivia entered a political crisis following the 2019 Bolivian general election. Opposition protesters denounced the candidacy of President Evo Morales, who was running for a fourth term, and claimed that he was benefiting from electoral fraud. Following a police mutiny, the initial conclusions of an OAS audit of the election, and public urging by the commander of the Armed Forces, Morales resigned on 10 November 2019. Supporters, including Morales' coca grower base in the Chapare region of Cochabamba Department, immediately began protests denouncing his ouster as a military coup. Jeanine Áñez was sworn in as interim president on 12 November.

Following the widespread police mutiny before the Áñez government took power, Colonel Jaime Edwin Zurita Trujillo became the Cochabamba departmental commander on November 8. Upon taking command, Zurita publicly supported a right-wing motorcycle gang and called for them to mobilize in opposition to pro-MAS attacks, including forming barricades. While Zurita was in command, police and military operated together following an operation called Plan Sebastián Pagador. On 11 November, security forces shot and killed Miguel Ledezma Gonzáles. The Interdisciplinary Group of Independent Experts (GIEI) concluded that from 12 to 14 November security forces acted with unnecessary and arbitrary force. Zurita threatened to "hunt" all those who tried to pass.

Within this context, demonstrators from the Chapare and other rural areas in the department began to gather in Sacaba on 14 November. The police began preventing people from entering Chapare on the morning of 14 November. However, civilians continued arriving to the area as part of a march protesting continued State aggression. The march was primarily organized by the Six Federations of the Tropic of Cochabamba. On 15 November, as part of this march from the Chapare region to La Paz thousands of Indigenous and cocalero protesters were passing through Sacaba. Protesters reported that they were marching in opposition to abuses by the new government including attacks against indigenous women. Marchers were instructed to be non-violent. Police set up a cordon at the Huayllani bridge at kilometer 10 on the Cochabamba highway. The area was militarized with police and at least one tank, a helicopter, and a small plane.

On 14 November 2019, amid continuing protests, violence and shortages in several main cities, Áñez and her cabinet signed a decree to enlist the police and army to pacify the country. This was issued as Supreme Decree 4078 on 15 December. Article 3 of the decree reads, "The personnel of the Armed Forces who participate in operations to restore internal order and public stability will be exempt from criminal liability when, in compliance with their constitutional functions, they acted in legitimate defense or state of necessity, in observance of the principles of legality, absolute necessity and proportionality." The decree was criticized by several human rights groups, including the Inter-American Commission on Human Rights, Amnesty International, Human Rights Watch and the UN Human Rights Commission, all of whom called for its immediate revocation. Amnesty International described it as "carte blanche" for human rights abuses.

== Events ==
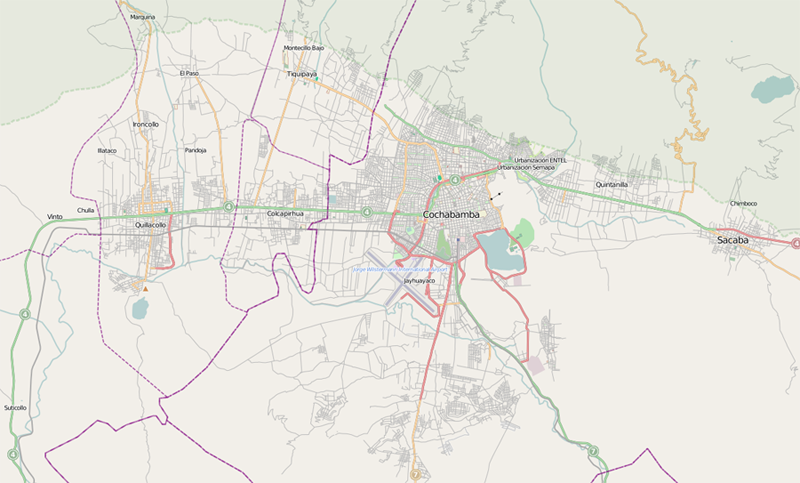
Map showing the location of the Cochabamba region. Sacaba is to the east of Cochabamba city.

On 15 November, protesters began to march for the day, approaching the Huayllani bridge. According to the preliminary OAS investigation, the group was initially met with verbal instructions that the Defensoría del Pueblo (Bolivian Human Rights Ombudsman's Office) was on its way to intervene. According to the IHRC report, between 3 and 3:30pm, protesters asked the police if they could cross the bridge. The police commander, Colonel Jaime Zurita said, that they should wait 30 minutes and remove their gas masks, set their wiphalas (Indigenous flags) down, and send women to the front. Protesters began to march after 20–30 minutes after complying with the demands to lay their things down. About 30 minutes to an hour later, without warning, police began shooting tear gas at the protesters. Many protesters began running from the gas, mothers with babies on the backs were choking, suffocating, and crying for help.

Many, including children and the elderly tried to find refuge in nearby homes and buildings. Those who did not disperse grabbed rocks and rubber tires to create a barrier to prevent police from advancing. About 30 minutes after shooting the tear gas, police began shooting both rubber bullets and live ammunition at the protesters. Demonstrators reported being shot at for at least two hours, even as they tried to flee and seek shelter and/or help other demonstrators who were shot. Reports note that the first shot was fired around 4:30pm and the last was fired around 6:30pm. Police chased and beat demonstrators who sought shelter in surrounding buildings and those who tended to the wounded. Hospitals were overwhelmed by the number of people who needed medical care. Some police impeded the injured from seeking medical care, shooting at those who were assisting the wounded. In addition, many victims were either denied access to care at hospitals, were chastised by medical officials, or had to wait hours to receive treatment. Protesters used their personal vehicles to bring the wounded to surrounding hospitals as there were not enough ambulances. At least 11 people were killed and over 120 injured.

Arturo Murillo, Bolivian government minister at the time, affirmed that all of the deceased had been "killed with a shotgun, with a 22-caliber bullet, with dynamite, that is, they were assassinated by their own companions."

Victims included:

1. César Sipe Mérida, 18 years old
2. Omar Calle Siles, 26 years old
3. Placido Rojas Delgadillo, 18 years old
4. Emilio Colque, 21 years old
5. Armando Carballo Escobar, 25 years old
6. Juan López Apaza, 34 years old
7. Lucas Sánchez Valencia, 43 years old
8. Julio Pinto, 51 years old
9. Marco Vargas Martínez, age unknown
10. Roger Gonzales, age unknown.
11. Roberto Sejas Escobar, 28 years old

The police and government initially denied responsibility for the day's events, reporting that 201 people were involved in "violent acts" and 10 men were arrests. State authorities said that the police had not opened fire but that the protesters had shot one another. The interim government reported that demonstrators shot one another in the back.

However, a former Bolivian army soldier reported to the IHRC that soldiers bring their own weapons. In addition, government issued bullets were also found in the wounded and dead. No state forces were shot. Finally, FAL caliber 7.62 mm bullets were found at the massacre, the same type of bullets used by state forces.

== Aftermath ==
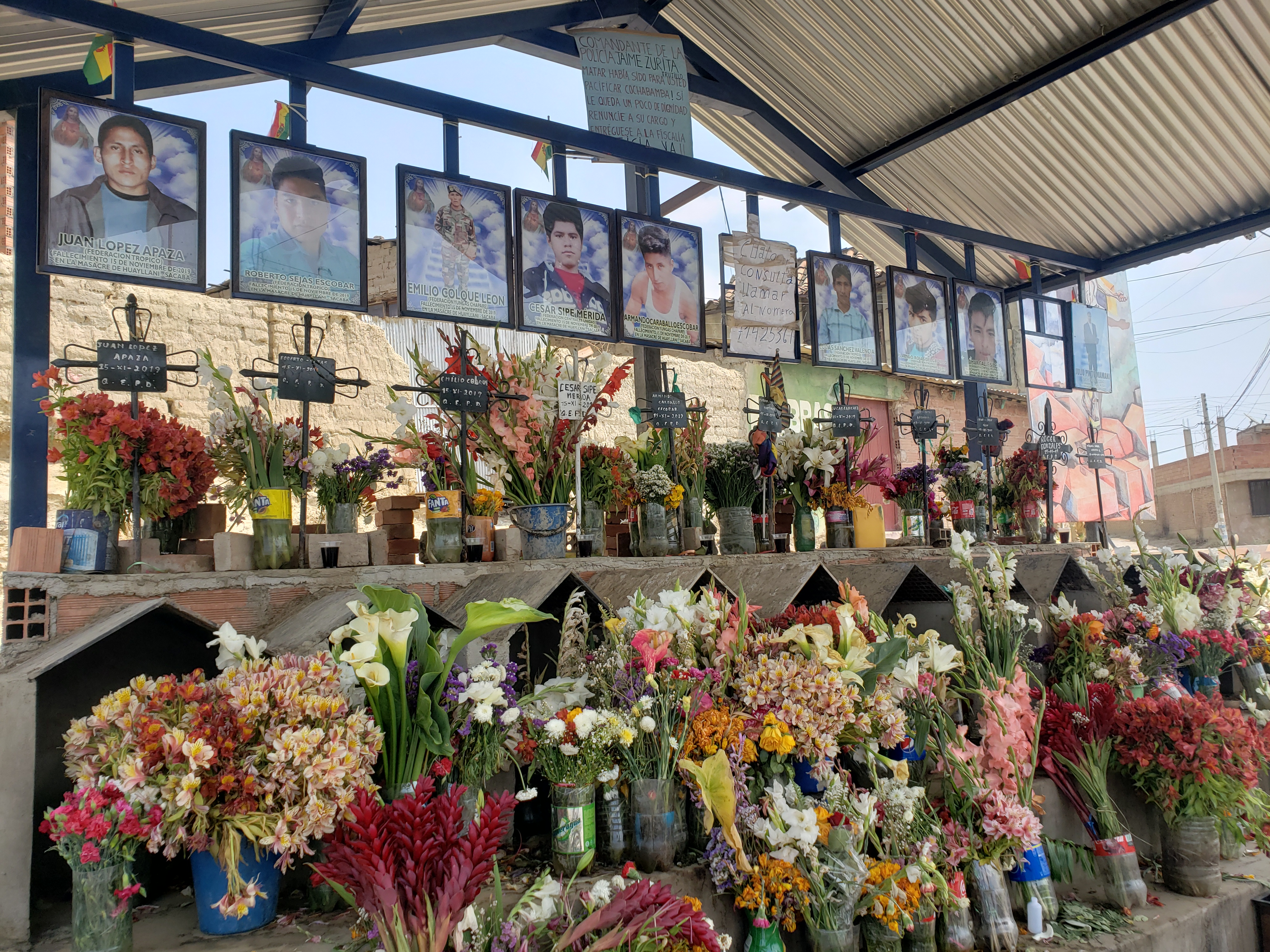
Memorial created for the victims of the Sacaba massacre.

Following the massacre, on 16 November district attorneys in Cochabamba opened four investigations. One for homicide, one for serious injuries, and two criminal investigations directed at protesters. The investigations against protesters were closed shortly thereafter on 5 February 2020 due to lack of evidence. The remaining two cases were merged into one focusing on the violence of the massacre led by Prosecutor Richard Villaca. However, witnesses have reported that State forces destroyed evidence of the massacre from picking up bullet casings to impeding access to autopsies or providing incomplete information. There has also been significant witness intimidation.

On 28 November, Áñez repealed the controversial Supreme Decree 4078, after a second massacre occurred in the Senkata district of El Alto, in which another nine people were killed and more injured.

On 7 December 2019, the government offered compensation of 50,000 bolivianos (US$7,500) to victims' families, with a clause that dictated that they must give up their right to file international judicial complaints on the matter. The families rejected the offer and human rights activist Ruth Llanos called it an attempt to "silence the complaints of the victims' families". After the IACHR's preliminary report and ongoing talks, the proposed agreement was changed to remove the clause that prevented international complaints, and the compensation offered was increased to 100,000 bolivianos (US$15,000) for families of those killed and from 12,500 to 50,000 bolivianos for those injured, the amount depending on severity. By request of the families, the amount is to be given in humanitarian aid (including 12 months of food) rather than a single payment. A final agreement has not been reached as there is general mistrust that the government will follow through on its promises. As of 22 September 2020, 11 of 35 families have received this payment. Affected families also qualify for scholarships at the school and university level for the next academic year.

On 10 March 2020, the government ratified Supreme Decree 4176 which aimed to "strengthen the culture of social peace, through granting humanitarian social aid to the wounded and relatives of the deceased, as a result of the conflicts in the country between October 21 and November 24, 2019 ”. The decree included a variety of measures, including a payment of 100,000 bolivianos for those who had been killed.

On 11 June 2020, a tenth victim—Julio Pinto Mamani—died of wounds from the Sacaba massacre. The Bolivian Human Rights Ombudsman said the victim had "not received any assistance and died completely abandoned by the state" and demanded compliance in particular with the parts of Supreme Decree 4100 that mandated the financial coverage of medical care for victims. They also denounced that, after seven months, no advances had yet been made into the investigation into the massacre, saying, "seven months after what happened, the victims are still waiting to receive justice for what happened and the compensation promised by the State."

A march was held in Sacaba on 15 November 2020 in commemoration of the victims of the massacre.

== Human rights investigations ==
At the government's invitation, the IACHR investigated the deaths and injuries that occurred during this period of violence. On 10 December it published its preliminary observations, based on interviews conducted with eyewitnesses. It wrote, "it is appropriate to describe these events as massacres, given the number of people who lost their lives in the same way and at the same time and place, and because the acts in question were committed against a specific group of people. Furthermore, the patterns of injuries that have been recorded point strongly to extrajudicial killing practices". The report "reminded the Bolivian state that lethal force cannot be used merely to maintain or restore public order" and urged that those responsible be prosecuted, investigated, and sanctioned.

On 10 December 2019 the Bolivian government and the Inter-American Commission of Human Rights (IACHR) authorized an international Interdisciplinary Group of Independent Experts (GIEI) to conduct an investigation into the events that occurred during the 2019 political crisis. The report identified an unnecessary use of force during the Sacaba confrontation and denoted it a massacre. It included 26 recommendations to the State of Bolivia concerning the need for future investigations, judicial processes, victim reparations, and institutional changes needed after the 2019 crisis.

In March 2020, the Plurinational Assembly convened a multi-party commission of members of MAS, PDC and UD to investigate the deaths at the two locations. Their findings were delayed until 20 August and further postponed until 27 September. On 29 October 2020, in its last legal session, the Chamber of Deputies and the Senate, meeting in joint session, approved a final report on the “massacres of Senkata [and] Sacaba." The report recommended that Áñez be prosecuted for genocide and backed criminal indictments of 11 of her ministers. Senate president Eva Copa said that the report would be submitted to the prosecution service for possible proceedings.

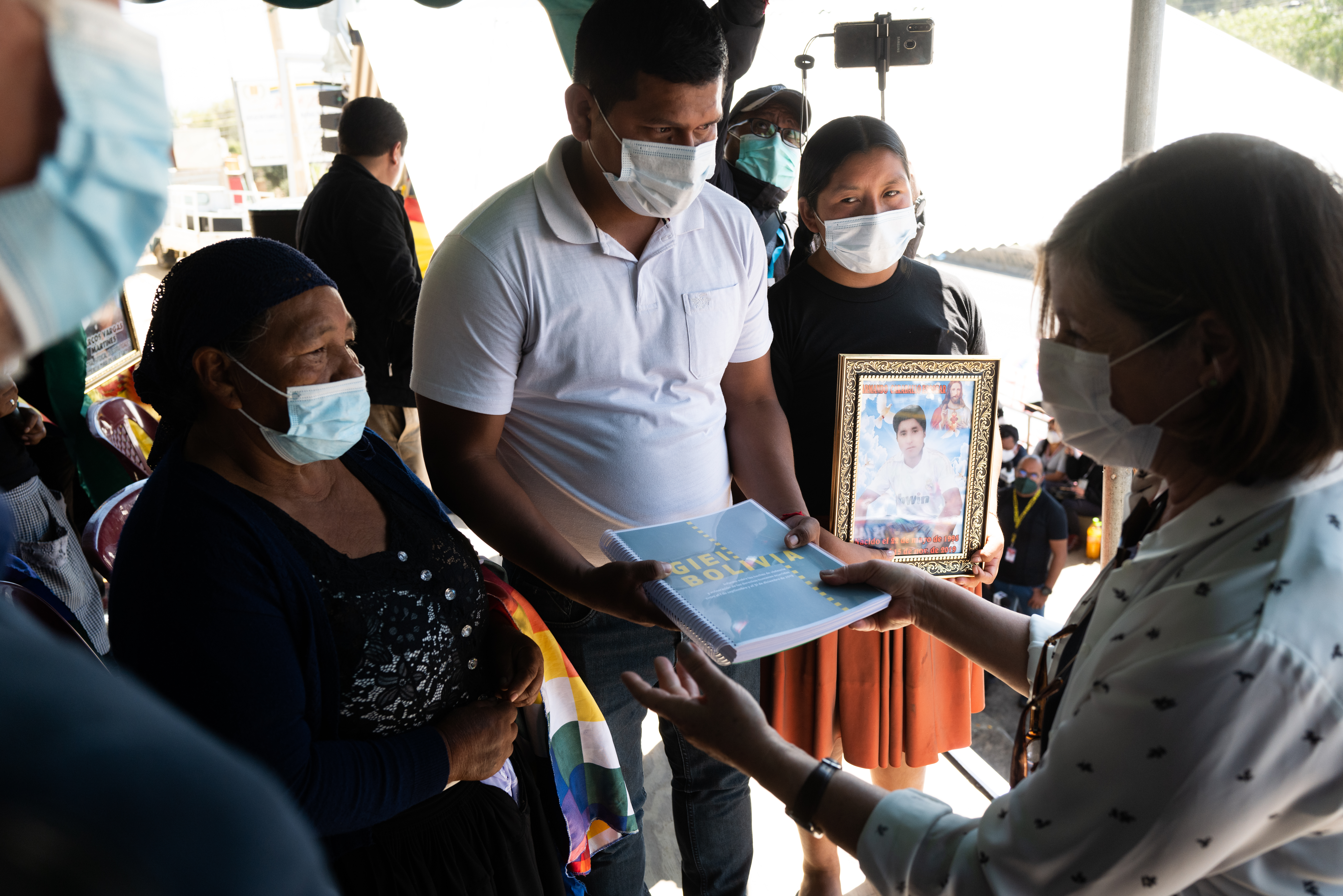
A copy of the investigative report by the Interdisciplinary Group of Independent Experts is offered to victims and survivors of the Sacaba massacre

The GIEI presented its report on human rights abuses during the 2019 crisis to affected communities at various points across the country, including at the Huayllani Bridge on 19 August 2019. The investigation confirmed the deaths of 10 victims (all except Roger Gonzales, who died in November and for whom details were unavailable) and qualified the events as a massacre. It confirmed that at least 98 people were injured and 223 were detained by police. The investigators found no evidence for the Áñez government's claim of a firefight: "It cannot be affirmed that there was an armed confrontation between demonstrators and police or soldiers." Instead, the GIEI found that the police and military initiated the attack, began by gassing the crowd, and then proceeded to advance towards the crowd, firing upon the crowd and continuing fire as the crowd retreated. It also concluded that many of those detained after the massacre were mistreated and at least 9 were tortured.

== Criminal investigations ==
The Departmental Prosecutor's Office opened an investigation into the day's events on 16 November 2019, but the case remained in the investigative stage through the rest of Jeanine Áñez's administration.

A series of indictments were issued beginning in November 2020:

- On 25 November 2020, General Alfredo Cuéllar Mercado, former head of the Strategic Operations Command, was indicted for murder and attempted murder for constructing the Operations Plan for the day and for allegedly leading the military forces at the Huayllani bridge. He denies being commanding troops at the scene. Cuéllar was placed under house arrest.
- On 18 February 2021, former departmental police commander Jaime Edwin Zurita Trujillo was indicted for murder and attempted murder.
- On 25 February 2021, prosecutors indicted the then-Minister of Government, Arturo Murillo Prijic; Minister of Defense Luis Fernando López; Sergio Carlos Orellana Centellas, commanding general of the Armed Forces; and Rodolfo Antonio Montero Torricos, commander of the national Police. Only Montero Torricos was taken into custody.
- On 28 January 2022, Air Force soldier Oscar Armando Caba was arrested for participation in the massacre.
- On November 9, 2023, the Sacaba Tribunal in charge of the case declared it had no competence to judge Áñez. It also declared the former president should be impeached instead.

== See also ==
- Ayacucho massacre
