= Senkata massacre =

2019 Bolivian massacre of protesters

- Part of the 2019 Bolivian political crisis
- Location: Senkata, El Alto, Bolivia
- Date: 19 November 2019; 6 years ago
- Target: Protesters
- Attack type: Massacre
- Weapon: Firearms
- Deaths: 11
- Injuries: ~80
- Perpetrators: Bolivian National Police, Armed Forces of Bolivia

The 2019 Senkata massacre occurred when Bolivian soldiers and police broke up a road blockade at the YPFB gas facility in Senkata, El Alto, Bolivia, on 19 November 2019. It occurred one week into the interim presidency of Jeanine Áñez and four days after the Sacaba massacre. Rural and urban protesters had blockaded the plant shortly after the ouster of Bolivian president Evo Morales. Their protests were part of nationwide blockades by his supporters denouncing the ouster as a coup d'état, and urban protests in El Alto against the new government's desecration of the wiphala, an Indigenous flag designated a Bolivian national symbol by the 2009 Constitution. By 14 November, protesters had built barricades as part of their blockade.

During the morning of 19 November, security forces escorted trucks containing natural gas canisters out of the plant. Before noon, they began clashing with protesters who dismantled the wall and attempted to get inside. The security forces used live ammunition on demonstrators in the vicinity of the plant, as well in surrounding neighborhoods throughout the afternoon. Eleven people, all of them civilians and including some bystanders, were shot dead or fatally wounded during the day's events. The Interdisciplinary Group of Independent Experts, appointed by the Inter-American Commission of Human Rights, estimates that eighty people were wounded that day among bullets of 22 caliber and dynamite.

Following the events of 19 November, the government issued a series of conflicting reports about the day, both denying that militarized forces had shot their weapons and arguing that the military had to intervene to prevent a terrorist attack. Investigative reports and witness testimony debunked the initial governmental narrative and illustrated how governmental forces used extreme force and committed extrajudicial executions in what the Inter-American Commission on Human rights has called a massacre. In 2021, three Defense Ministers and five military officers were arrested and/or indicted on charges relating to the massacre. Following this, in 2022 Departmental police commander William Cordero was indicted.

The 19 November police and military intervention marked the end of disruptions to the supply of natural gas in La Paz and El Alto, but not of protests against the Áñez government. Talks between pro-Morales movements and the Áñez government led to a promise of new elections and demobilization of protests.

The Inter-American Commission on Human Rights denounced the Senkata events as a massacre in December 2019, and the Interdisciplinary Group of Independent Experts ratified that description in its 2021 report on human rights violations during the crisis. The massacre was also investigated and condemned by the Harvard Law School International Human Rights Clinic and the University Network for Human Rights.

== Background ==
Bolivia entered into a political crisis following the 20 October 2019, national elections. Opposition protesters denounced the candidacy of President Evo Morales, who was running for a fourth term, and claimed that he was benefiting from electoral fraud. Following a police mutiny, the initial conclusions of an OAS audit of the election, and public urging by the commander of the Armed Forces, Morales resigned on 10 November 2019. Supporters, including Morales' coca grower base in the Chapare region of Cochabamba department, immediately began protests denouncing his ouster as a military coup. Jeanine Áñez was sworn in as interim president on 12 November.

Residents of El Alto opposed to the new government began protest blockades across the city, including at the Senkata plant on 11 November 2019. By 14 November, YPFB reported that it was unable to send gas canisters out of the facility and this was leading to shortages in the municipality of La Paz.

On 15 November 2019, amid continuing protests, violence and shortages in several main cities, Áñez and her cabinet signed a decree to enlist the police and army to pacify the country. This was issued as Supreme Decree 4078 on 15 December. Article 3 of the decree reads, "The personnel of the Armed Forces who participate in operations to restore internal order and public stability will be exempt from criminal liability when, in compliance with their constitutional functions, they acted in legitimate defense or state of necessity, in observance of the principles of legality, absolute necessity and proportionality." The decree was criticised by several human rights groups, including the Inter-American Commission on Human Rights, Amnesty International, Human Rights Watch and the UN Human Rights Commission, who all called for its immediate revocation. Amnesty International described it as "carte blanche" for human rights abuses.

== Events ==
In response to ongoing persecution against Indigenous peoples, including the Sacaba massacre, and the new interim government, communities throughout El Alto had been organizing non-violent blockades. Groups involved in the protests included the CSUTCB (Confederación Sindical Única de Trabajadores Campesinos de Bolivia), the National Confederation of Indigenous Rural Women from Bolivia - Bartolina Sisa, and the Túpac Katari Rural Workers Federation. Historically the Senkata gas plant which belongs to Yacimientos Petrolífos Fiscales Bolivianos (YPFB), has been a central site for protests due to its strategic location. The plant provides gas to La Paz, as such, blocking the plant prevents trucks from passing through from the La Paz to Alto area. On 14 November protesters began building blockades that limited both the ability of trucks to leave and the ability of some food and fuel to enter. They also dug trenches in front of the main doors to the plant to prevent trucks from entering. The same day, the interim government ratified Decree 4078 which granted impunity to the armed forces from any violent acts used to "maintain public order".

As the blockade continued, it began to cause gas shortages and frustration mounted. The interim government said that they would negotiate with the protesters, and protesters demanded that armed forces leave as a condition under which they would end the blockade. On 18 November, there was a town meeting of El Alto neighborhood councils. At the meeting they voted to continue and intensify the blockades.

On 18 November the government deployed a caravan of military vehicles and soldiers inside the Senkata plant. When interviewed by the GIEI, Brigadier General Franko Suárez who was responsible for security at Senkata stated that he did not have command over the escort, but rather the operation was directly under the Commander of the Armed Forces. Forces included at least 304 troops from the División Mecanizada 1, RCM-4 "Ingavi" 1207 and RAAM-6 "Mcal. Bilbao" 1208. The following morning, 19 November, the military operation began to escort gas from the plant. Based on information collected from the GIEI report from Army and Air Force reports, at 6:00am administrative personnel and their drivers began arriving to the plant. According to a report submitted the Special Rapporteur on extrajudicial, summary and arbitrary executions, at around 8am a military escort arrived to help move 45 gas-filled tanker trucks and trucks filled with gas canisters from the plant. Protesters, local residents, shop owners and shoppers were all present. At 9:15am military and police forces from the RCM-4/Ingavi division left their station to head to the plant. Between 10 and 10:15am police and armed forces at the plant unlocked the main entrance to prepare for the gas trucks to leave. Shortly after, the security convoy that would be escorting the gas trucks arrived. After shooting tear gas, at around 10:00am state forces then began to shoot live rounds at demonstrators including those fleeing the demonstrations and those helping the injured. Investigative Reports note that when the firing first began, security forces made no attempts to negotiate or warn surrounding individuals. Demonstrators and civilians, including women with children attempted to flee. Those living around the plant who were not part of the protests fled their homes as the gas entered. Witnesses reported seeing dozens of people suffocating on the gas and overall panic. Protesters decided to lift the blockade around 10:30am to let the trucks through. However, repression continued.

The trucks proceeded to leave the plant, escorted by police and military troops, at around 10:50am. Military reports note that protests began at 11:15am. However, testimonies collected from witnesses and attendees note that between 9 and 11 am, without warning, state forces began firing tear gas at those outside the plant, attempting to break the blockade. Based on Army and Air Force reports, at 11:44am the commander of the CEO Andino received a verbal command to mobilize an Anti-Riot company to aid in "reclaiming" the Plant. Then at 12:10pm about 110 troops from the Mecanizada division left their barracks under the orders of Franko Orlando Suárez González. These troops arrived at the plant around 1:40pm. Navy reports detail a different timeline. According to these reports the Ingavi troops arrived at the plant around 11:40am and left around 12:30am without any incidence. Despite discrepancies between the reports, based on both video evidence and confirmed by the GIEI reports, the trucks left the plant between 10:50am and 11:40am without issue. Demonstrators did not prevent them from leaving. Though the trucks left without incident, security forces continued repressive measures. The GIEI report called the militarized actions "violent persecution" against demonstrators and civilians in the surrounding area that resulted in extrajudicial executions.

Security forces broke into people's homes to use their roofs to shoot at civilians. A military helicopter also shot tear gas, rubber bullets and live ammunition from above. Witnesses report that state forces were targeting people who were not participating in the blockades and those who just walking through the area. For example, both Milton Zentero a young university student and 22-year-old Joel Colque were shot as they returned home from school and work respectively. 21-year-old Jose Tenorio Mamani was shot and killed as he was helping the injured. Similarly, Antonio Ronald Quispe Ticona was killed as he tried to shield civilians from bullets shot from the helicopter. He left his home around 1:30pm, and while watching the footage on television, his Uncle identified him as a victim around 4:30pm. Joel Colque was shot around 10:00am suggesting that the shootings began minimally one hour after the tear gassing began. Another victim, Clemente Eloy Mamani Santander was shot between 10 and 10:30 am. Pedro Quisbert Mamani, 37, was shot and killed between 3 and 3:30pm, as was Rudy Cristian Vazquez Condori, 23, who left his house around this time. Many of the victims families reported that they were not participating in the protests but were simply passing through. However, according to the GIEI, due to the widespread persecution, some families could be afraid of identifying their family members as protesters.

The violence took place over about 8 hours, from 10 am to 6pm. Witnesses report incidents of shooting at three different intervals between 10:30am and 11:30am, 2:00 and 3:30pm, and 4:30 and 5:00pm. At least eleven people were killed and the number of wounded were variously reported as 72 or 80. The killed include:

1. Deyvid Posto Cusi (34).
2. Antonio Ronald Quispe Ticona (24)
3. Clemente Eloy Mamani Santander (23)
4. Joel Colque Patty (22)
5. Pedro Quisbert Mamani (37)
6. Juan José Tenorio Mamani (23)
7. Rudy Cristian Vazquez Condori (23)
8. Milton David Gironda (24)
9. Edwin Jamachi Paniagua (38)
10. Calixto Huanaco Aguilario (32)
11. Emilio Fernández

During what the Inter-American Commission on Human rights has since called a massacre, security forces also forcibly arrested civilians and dragged them into the plant. They also dragged at least one wounded or dead person into the plant after the initial tear gassing. Fearing that security forces would disappear the bodies of those killed and wounded, some threw stones at the plant while other protesters knocked down the wall of the plant. This was met with increased violence from the security forces in an area that extended far beyond the initial blockade of the plant. The police returned some of the detained individuals to the police station later that night.

Victims reported varying responses at the hospitals at which they sought treatment. Some reported good care while others noted that some hospitals blatantly turned people away due to their presumed association with the MAS-ISP, or demanded payment up front, delaying treatment. Police also arrived at the hospital and took some injured away. Similarly, multiple reports including the GIEI and a submission to the UN special rapporteur report noted that some people did not seek medical treatment for fear of repercussions.

== Aftermath ==
The 19 November police and military intervention marked the end of disruptions to the supply of natural gas in La Paz and El Alto. However, by the following day, anti-Áñez blockades were mounted at 102 points in all nine of Bolivia's departments.

In the immediate aftermath, seven people were arrested on charges of terrorism and sedition, specifically on destruction of part of the Senkata refinery wall, which the defence minister warned could have ended in a tragedy if gas tanks and other fuels exploded.

The government denied responsibility for the attack arguing that civilians were responsible for the violence. On 19 November, the Defense Minister, Fernando López said that the military intervention was peaceful but protesters were violent. He said that they "were proven to be paid and drunk" and that the military did not shoot a weapon. At the same time officials noted that the military did not fire a weapon, they simultaneously argued that the military had to intervene because the protesters were going to explode the plant, committing a terrorist attack. However, a thorough investigation conducted by the GIEI indicates that both of these claims were false. When protesters blew out a piece of the plant wall, sensitive structures of the plant were not targeted. In addition, upon further ballistic analysis and investigation by the Bolivian legislature, they found clear evidence that police and armed forces did fire weapons. Ballistics reports indicate that the munitions fired were lethal projectiles of 5.5-millimeter caliber, 7.62-militmeter caliber, and 22-caliber weapons assigned to the Armed Forces and police. In addition, most victims were shot in the neck, back, or side indicating that most were shot as they fled. Further investigative reports found that security forces acted with a disproportionate use of force and provoked a massacre.

On 21 November, President Áñez said, "We deeply regret the deaths of our brothers in El Alto. It hurts us because we are a government of peace", and called for dialogue with the protesters. In addition, she asked international organizations and the church to accompany this process in order to stop the violence. "Let's unite to reconcile, to build the Bolivia for which we are all fighting and so that one Bolivian is never above the other", Áñez said. On 22 November, the pro-Morales movement entered roundtable talks with the Áñez government, mediated by the Catholic Church and foreign diplomats. Áñez agreed to hold new elections in which Evo Morales would not be a candidate. In return, the movements demobilized protests.

On 14 December 2019, at a graduation ceremony at the special forces training base at Sanandita, Defense Minister Luis Fernando López praised Fuerza 10 as "the heroes of Senkata", highlighting their mission "to organize, to plan, to train, and to execute direct action and special operations to maintain order".

== Accountability processes ==
=== Human rights investigations ===
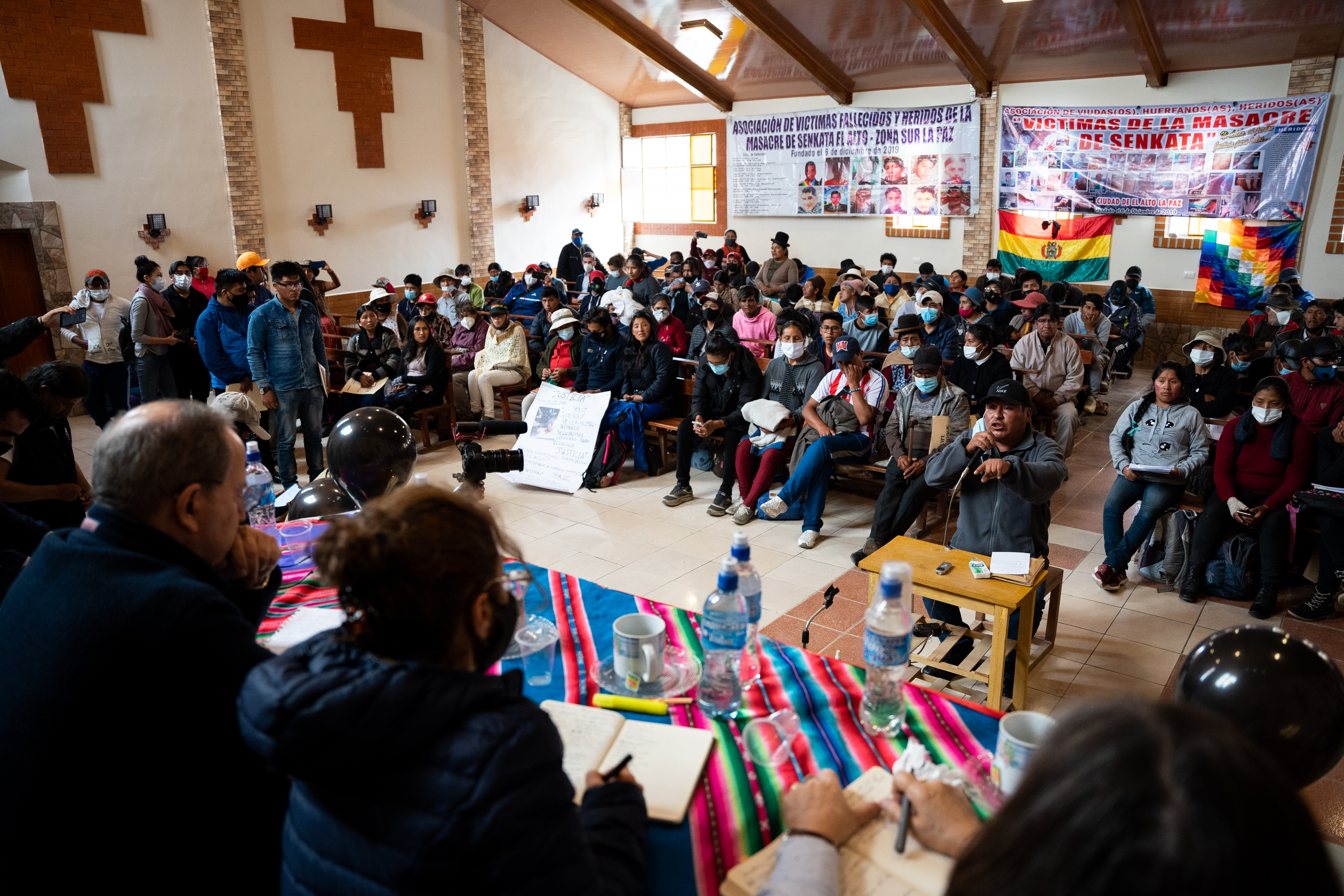
Interdisciplinary Group of Independent Experts meets with association of survivors and victims of the Senkata massacre.

The Sacaba and Senkata massacres prompted the Inter-American Commission on Human Rights to conduct a fact-finding mission to Bolivia 22 to 26 November 2019. On 23 November, pro-Áñez protesters surrounded the La Paz hotel where the IACHR delegation met to receive testimonies from victims of abuses. The delegation reconvened at the San Francisco de Asis chapel in El Alto and received testimonies from survivors. On 10 December 2019, the Commission released "preliminary observations" describing the events at Sacaba and Senkata as massacres.

Based on their preliminary findings the IACHR recommended the creation of an international and independent mechanism of investigation that could fully elaborate the truth and identify those responsible for human rights violations between September 1 and December 31, 2019. On 10 December 2019, the Bolivian government and the Inter-American Commission of Human Rights (IACHR) authorized an international Interdisciplinary Group of Independent Experts (GIEI) to conduct an investigation into the events that occurred during the 2019 political crisis. The report identified an unnecessary use of force during the Senkata massacre and included 26 recommendations to the State of Bolivia concerning the need for future investigations, judicial processes, victim reparations, and institutional changes needed after the 2019 crisis.

A group of staff and students from the International Human Rights Clinic at Harvard Law School and University Network for Human Rights (IHRC) conducted a fact-finding mission on the violence that occurred under President Áñez beginning on 12 November. IHRC staff and students conducted research in Bolivia for three weeks in October and November 2019 and two months in December 2019 and January 2020. The team interviewed over 220 individuals including victims and their relatives, activists, human rights defenders, lawyers, medical providers, governmental officials, and police and military officers. The team also conducted five months of documentation review including audio-visual evidence and other reports. The results of their research were released in a report focusing on events that occurred in Senkata and Sacaba, other forms of state violence and persecution against human rights defenders and activists, and obstacles to a thorough investigative process. The report also included recommendations to the Bolivian state for the protection of human rights, investigations and accountability processes for the Sacaba and Senkata massacres, and the protection of victims among others.

In addition, five non-governmental organizations, the Andean Information Network (AIN), Association for Human Rights, the Center for Legal and Social Studies (CELS), the Europe-Third World Center (CETIM), and the University Network for Human Rights (UNHR), conducted a joint investigation on the events of 19 November. Throughout the investigation they collected and reviewed witness testimony, audio-visual documentation, legal documents, reports from other organizations, public statements by Bolivian authorities, and other information publicly available. They submitted their findings to the UN Special Rapporteur on extrajudicial, summary or arbitrary executions. In response to the investigative reports the UN received by these and other organizations, they issued a statement condemning the massacre and calling on the Bolivian government to investigate the human rights violations carried out.

In March 2020 a Bolivian legislative commission began to conduct an investigation into all deaths that occurred after the 2019 electoral crisis. Led by Deputy Victor Borda, the investigation was conducted over seven months and included collecting about 150 statements, ballistics reports, documents from the Institute of Forensic Investigations, and visits to the sites of violence. The report found that deaths in the Senkata massacre were the result of official military and police weapons.

=== Compensation ===
On 7 December 2019, the government offered compensation of 50,000 bolivianos (US$7,500) to victims' families, with a clause that dictated that they must give up their right to file international judicial complaints on the matter. The families rejected the offer and human rights activist Ruth Llanos called it an attempt to "silence the complaints of the victims' families". After the IACHR's preliminary report and ongoing talks, the proposed agreement was changed to remove the clause that prevented international complaints, and the compensation offered was increased to 100,000 bolivianos (US$15,000) for families of those killed and from 12,500 to 50,000 bolivianos for those injured, the amount depending on severity.

On 10 March 2020, the government ratified Supreme Decree 4176 which aimed to "strengthen the culture of social peace, through granting humanitarian social aid to the wounded and relatives of the deceased, as a result of the conflicts in the country between 21 October and 24 November 2019 ". The decree included a variety of measures, including a payment of 100,000 bolivianos of "humanitarian aid" for those who had been killed. In addition the Servicio de Desarrollo de las Empresas Públicas Productivas (Sedem) was granted a period of 12 months to transfer 500 bolivianos to all who were killed or injured. As of April 2021, of 209 people who had identification numbers and were identified either as victims or relatives of those killed in the Senkata massacre and La Paz violence, only 43 people had picked up their support packets.

In January 2021, the government adopted another act intended to support victims and relatives of the deceased. This act included provisions to place individuals in governmental jobs and with corresponding training.

=== Judicial investigations, arrests, and indictments ===
Five former military officers were arrested in July 2021 for their alleged responsibility for the massacre:

- General Iván Inchauste Rioja, General Commander of the Army
- General Luis Fernando Valverde Ferrufino, former director of the National Hydrocarbons Agency (ANH) and a former general
- General Franko Suárez Gonzales, commander of the first mechanized division of the Army
- Colonel Julio Tamayo Rivera, subchief of operations of the Chief Command of the Armed Forces
- General Pablo Guerra Camacho, head of the joint command of the Armed Forces

Police Commander Rodolfo Montero was detained in September 2021.

Luis Fernando Valverde Ferrufino was formally indicted for the massacre in February 2021. At the time of the massacre, Valverde was director of the National Hydrocarbons Agency and retired from military service. According to the indictment, multiple military witnesses testified that Valverde was at the Ingavi barracks in El Alto on the day of the massacre and ordered the deployment of troops prior to the massacre. A military escort had accompanied a shipment of gas from the Senkata plant and arrived at the barracks. According to the seven cited witnesses, Valverde Ferrufino ordered six armored military vehicles with nine or ten soldiers each to return to Senkata. Valverde Ferrufino denies that he had the authority to give any military order.

Several ministers—Interior Minister Arturo Murillo, Defense Minister Fernando López, and Hydrocarbons Minister Víctor Hugo Zamora—were indicted in October 2021. Departmental police commander William Cordero was indicted in January 2022 for ordering the deployment of 509 troops to Senkata. A formal indictment against Áñez, seventeen former ministers, and several military and police chiefs was brought by the Prosecutor's Office to the Fourth Criminal Sentencing Court of El Alto on 23 October 2023. The judges unanimously declined to hear the case against Áñez, arguing that they lacked jurisdiction. Since the state apparatus had generally regarded Áñez as the constitutional president during her time in office, only a trial of responsibilities in the legislature could apply. The court further noted that to ignore the constitutionality of Áñez's mandate "would be to question the legality of [incumbent] authorities", whose elections "emanate from the norms promulgated by Jeanine Áñez".

== Commemorations ==
The Heroes of Senkata Plaza was built in El Alto's District 8 under the leadership of Mayor Eva Copa and inaugurated in November 2021. It includes a monument to the victims, green spaces, and mural depicting Andean Indigenous cosmology.

== See also ==
- Sacaba massacre on November 15, 2019
- Bolivian gas conflict — 2003 protests with blockades and deaths at the Senkata plant
- Juliaca massacre in Peru
