= Luis Fernando López =

Bolivian Minister of Defense (born 1964)

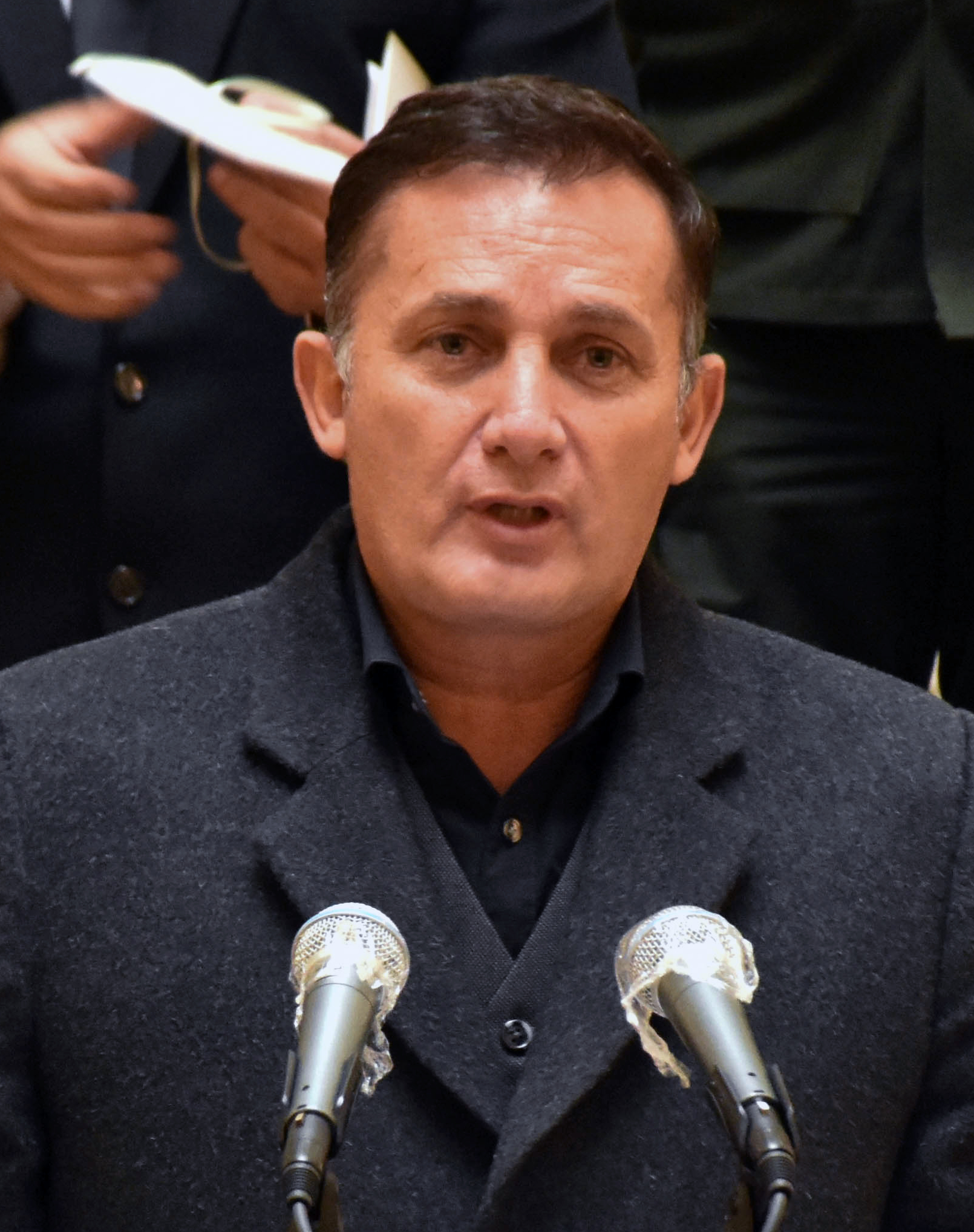

Minister of Defense
- In office 10 March 2020 – 5 November 2020 (Note: The entire Áñez cabinet resigned on 6 November 2020. Former officials have asserted that López had already left his duties "days before", though it is unclear when exactly his resignation was issued and accepted. López fled the country on 5 November.)
- President: Jeanine Áñez
- Preceded by: Gastón Peñaloza (acting)
- Succeeded by: Edmundo Novillo
- In office 13 November 2019 – 9 March 2020
- President: Jeanine Áñez
- Preceded by: Javier Zavaleta
- Succeeded by: Gastón Peñaloza (acting)

Personal details
- Born: Luis Fernando López Julio; 15 October 1964 (age 61) La Paz, Bolivia
- Spouse: Katya Fuertes Gutiérrez
- Parent: Luis López Bacigalupo (father)
- Education: National Military College; San Pablo Bolivian Catholic University

Military service
- Allegiance: Bolivia
- Branch/service: Bolivian Army
- Years of service: 1985–1990
- Rank: Second lieutenant
- Unit: "Calama" Armored Cavalry Regiment

Luis Fernando López Julio (born 15 October 1964) is a Bolivian businessman, retired military officer, and politician who served as minister of defense from 2019 to 2020. Appointed in the tail end of the 2019 political crisis, López, along with Minister of Government Arturo Murillo, quickly became characterized as the "strong men" of the Jeanine Áñez administration and were implicated in the deadly events at Senkata and Sacaba. López was called to hearings by the Plurinational Legislative Assembly but failed to present himself three consecutive times, ultimately resulting in his censure by the legislature. As per the terms of the Constitution, he was dismissed as minister but, exploiting a loophole in the document's text, he was reappointed just a day later. Soon after, reports revealed his participation in the tear gas case, which accused the ministries of government and defense of irregularly purchasing non-lethal weapons at inflated prices.

After the 2020 general election, López entered contact with American ex-army soldiers, seeking to facilitate the transport of mercenaries and paramilitaries to Bolivia in order to launch a preemptive coup d'état that would prevent President-elect Luis Arce from coming to office. After that endeavor proved unfruitful, he, along with Murillo, fled the country just three days prior to Arce's inauguration. He remains in hiding in Brazil as the Bolivian government seeks his extradition for crimes of breach of duties, among others.

== Early life and career ==
Luis Fernando López was born on 15 October 1964 in La Paz to Luis López Bacigalupo, a division general. On his mother's side, his grandfather was Rubén Julio Castro, who served as senator for Pando in the 1950s. Following his father's example, López underwent military training abroad, graduating from the National Military College of Argentina in 1985 as a second lieutenant of arms and cavalry and a military paratrooper. The following year, he joined the Special Troops Instruction Center in Cochabamba, where he taught a parachuting course as a sub-instructor. Also in 1986, he served as an officer and instructor at the School of Bolivian Condors in Sanandita, doing so until 1989. Shortly thereafter, in 1990, he was assigned to the "Calama" Regiment in Patacamaya, after which he retired from the Armed Forces.

In addition to his military service, López has a degree in social communication from the San Pablo Catholic University. He worked as the manager for Bolivia of Lowe's and McCann-Erickson and served as a consultant for BMW, Cinemark Theatres, the Coca-Cola Company, Copa Airlines, and Huawei. Until 2019, he was the executive president of Lola Group SRL, a marketing agency. During this time, López became closely acquainted with the Santa Cruz lawyer and civic activist Luis Fernando Camacho, for whom he eventually came to handle communication. In the midst of the protests and demonstrations that followed the disputed 2019 general elections, López revealed that Camacho had commissioned him, as a former army officer, to "converse" with the Armed Forces in order to avoid the repression of demonstrators. The culmination of this social unrest was the resignation of President Evo Morales along with his entire government. During the ensuing political crisis, López noted that Camacho, in discussions with Morales' likely successor Jeanine Áñez, had proposed him as a candidate to assume the defense portfolio.

== Minister of Defense ==
After legitimizing her succession to the presidency on 12 November, Áñez set about forming a transitional administration. On 13 November, she appointed her ministerial cabinet, designating López as minister of defense.

=== Legislative investigation ===
Following the events of Senkata and Sacaba, several legislators from the Movement for Socialism announced their intent to file a request for interpellation in the Legislative Assembly for López and Minister of Government Arturo Murillo, in order to receive an oral report on the incidents which led to several deaths. In late December, President of the Senate Eva Copa announced that the interpellation would be held after the recess of the assembly with President of the Chamber of Deputies Sergio Choque announcing on 3 January 2020 that the meetings had been scheduled for the 11th and 12th of that month. In response, on 10 January, both López and Murillo presented justifications for why they could not attend the session, which were accepted by the legislature who rescheduled it for the 17th. However, neither of the two presented themselves on that date, issuing further justifications for their absence. In view of this, the Chamber of Deputies approved on 19 February a formal request demanding that President Áñez "instruct the Ministers of State to comply with their constitutional duties".

=== Censure, dismissal, and reinstatement ===
In the session scheduled for 6 March, López was absent for the third consecutive time, alleging work reasons. This time, the Plurinational Assembly refused to accept his presented excuse and, with a two-thirds vote, moved to censure him, the first time any government minister had been censured since the passage of the 2009 Constitution. As per Copa, according to Article 158 of the Constitution, such a vote entailed the removal of the targeted official. In response, Áñez defended López, stating that he "has done a great job in the face of natural disasters and for the pacification of the homeland". Nonetheless, on 9 March, Áñez issued Presidential Decree N° 4175 which annulled López's appointment and designated Vice Minister Gastón Ramiro Peñaloza as the acting minister of defense. The next day, however, she reversed her decision and reappointed López to his position. According to Senator Óscar Ortiz Antelo, "the Constitution does not prohibit the [censured] minister from returning". In this context, the move to oust López only to immediately reappoint him was a way of respecting the Constitution while at the same time circumventing its provisions. In August, the assembly passed a law that closed this loophole by requiring the dismissal of censured ministers within 24 hours and barred them from serving in government positions for 3 years.

=== Tear gas case ===
López was implicated in another scandal when on 31 May 2020, the journalist Junior Arias brought to light accusations of irregular purchases of tear gas at highly inflated prices during the social conflicts of late 2019. According to the documents he presented, the Ministry of Government had requested the purchase of chemical agents from the Brazilian company Condor Tecnologias Não-Letais with the Miami-based company Bravo Tactical Solutions LLC as an intermediary. Though the case mostly shone the spotlight on Murillo, a complaint was also lodged against López who had signed the contract on 19 December, for an amount of $5.6 million. At that price, each tear gas cartridge would've cost between Bs250 and Bs270 ($36.25 to $39.15), more than double what other countries such as Venezuela had previously paid. López denied the allegations, claiming that the reason for the price difference was that the government had bought cartridges with 430gm of gunpowder, whereas the government in Caracas had purchased 225gm cartridges. However, no mention of weight ever appeared in the signed agreement.

== Flight from the country ==
Nearing the end of Áñez's transitional government, the Prosecutor's Office accused Murillo and López of crimes of improper use of influence, negotiations incompatible with the exercise of public functions by individuals, contracts harmful to the State, and breach of duties. On 5 November 2020, three days before the end of Áñez's mandate and the inauguration of president-elect Luis Arce, the anti-corruption prosecutor Luis Fernando Atanacio Fuentes issued a formal request for an immigration alert against the pair in order to avoid their preemptive departure from the country. That day, neither Murillo nor López were present for Áñez's final presidential address, which was attended by the rest of her ministers. While the entirety of the cabinet presented its resignation on 6 November, outgoing Minister of Economy Branko Marinković later revealed that the two had presented their resignations "days before".

The whereabouts of Murillo and López remained unclear for some days leading the Prosecutor's Office to request a report from the General Directorate of Migration on whether either of the former ministers had fled the country. On 16 November, it issued an arrest warrant against both of them on the grounds that "there are indications that the accused may hide, flee, or leave the country". The following day, Police Commander Colonel Johnny Aguilera reported that Murillo and López departed on a FAB-046 from El Trompillo Airport on 5 November, arriving in Santa Cruz, from where they crossed the border through Puerto Suárez and into Brazil. After that, they would've travelled on foot, through areas without immigration control, until they arrived at Corumbá. According to Colonel Pablo García, director of Interpol-Bolivia, López "used his last two days as an authority [to gain a] last favor" from members of the military, who secured the plane for his escape. While Murillo left for Panama on 9 November, López remained in Brazil.

As a result of these events, the former head of the General Directorate of Migration, Marcel Rivas, was apprehended on 19 November, with the Prosecutor's Office accusing him of having helped facilitate the flight of the ex-ministers. Three more officials, subordinates of the general directorate in offices in Puerto Quijarro and Puerto Suárez, were subsequently arrested on 21 November.

On 6 January 2021, the Prosecutor's Office announced its intent to indict Murillo and López on charges of breach of duties, improper use of influence, among other crimes relating to the tear gas case, in order to facilitate the activation of a Red Notice from Interpol The indictment was formalized two days later. Despite initial reports that both Murillo and López were in the United States, Minister of Government Eduardo del Castillo indicated on 27 May that López was still in Brazil and announced that the government would request his extradition from the country. On 14 July, Interpol-Brazil confirmed that López remains in the country.

=== Coup d'état plot ===
On 17 June 2021, journalists from The Intercept broke the story that in the few weeks after Luis Arce's victory in the 2020 general election López had attempted to facilitate a coup d'état to prevent his assumption to office. Leaked phone recordings and emails revealed that López had been in contact with Joe Pereira, a former civilian administrator with the U.S. Army. In the audio logs, López indicated that "military high command is already in preliminary talks" and promised that "the commander of the armed forces [Sergio Orellana] is working on all of this" and that "we have a united armed forces". López continued by stating that he was "focused on avoiding the annihilation of my country". Among the concerns within the armed forces were fears that the Movement for Socialism intended to replace them with civilian militias along Venezuelan lines. During his ministerial administration, López had echoed such concerns, stating in January 2020 that "[Evo Morales] indicates that there is a serious intention to eliminate the Armed Forces and the Police so that there is a foreign militia in our country". Bolivian political scientist Eduardo Gamarra also suggested that the armed forces "were rightly concerned there was going to be a major purge. The MAS was going to be furious".

In different call logs, Pereira assured that he could "get up to 10,000 men with no problem", outlining a plan to pick up personnel in Homestead Air Reserve Base in Miami using Bolivian-owned C-130s, of which the Ministry of Defense had one. The mercenaries would be placed under shell contracts to disguise the purpose of their presence. Pereira's claims were later characterized as exaggerated with his assurance of 10,000 men being called "absurd". The coup plot ultimately never came to fruition, largely due to disagreements between López and Murillo, whose capacity as minister of government gave him singular control of police.

Political offices
Preceded by Javier Zavaleta	Minister of Defense; 2019–2020	Succeeded by Gastón Peñaloza; Acting
Preceded by Gastón Peñaloza; Acting	Minister of Defense; 2020	Succeeded by Edmundo Novillo
