= Arturo Murillo =

Bolivian Minister of Government (2019–2020)

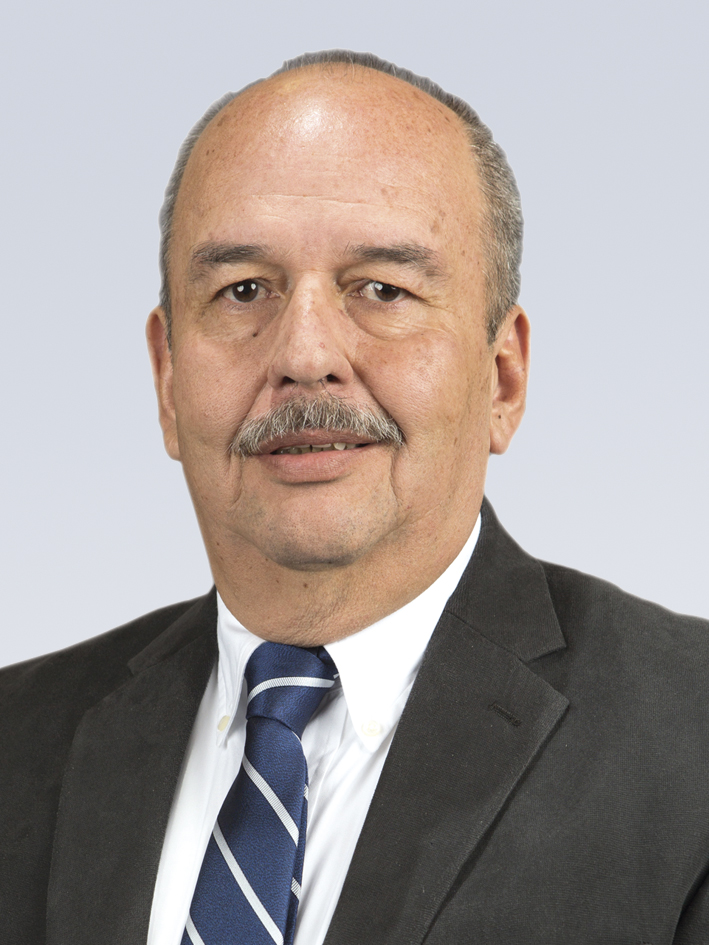

Minister of Government
- In office 20 October 2020 – 5 November 2020
- President: Jeanine Áñez
- Preceded by: Wilson Santamaría (acting)
- Succeeded by: Eduardo del Castillo
- In office 13 November 2019 – 19 October 2020
- President: Jeanine Áñez
- Preceded by: Carlos Romero
- Succeeded by: Wilson Santamaría (acting)

Senator for Cochabamba
- In office 18 January 2015 – 13 November 2020
- Substitute: Carmen Rosa Guzmán
- Preceded by: Lenny Zaconeta
- Succeeded by: Carmen Rosa Guzmán

Member of the Chamber of Deputies from Cochabamba
- In office 22 January 2006 – 19 January 2010
- Substitute: Héctor Cartagena Chacón
- Constituency: Plurinominal

Personal details
- Born: Arturo Carlos Murillo Prijic; 27 December 1963 (age 62) Cochabamba, Bolivia
- Party: Independent (2018–present)
- Other political affiliations: National Unity Front (2005–2018)
- Criminal information
- Status: Ongoing process: detained at the Federal Detention Center, Miami pending trial and/or extradition to Bolivia.
- Conviction: Filing of a forged instrument
- Criminal charges: Conspiracy to commit money laundering (United States); Improper use of influence and contracts harmful to the State, among others (Bolivia)
- Penalty: 2 years in San Pedro prison
- Time at large: 6 months and 21 days
- Arturo Murillo's voice Murillo warns of police action against locals and foreigners who commit terrorism and sedition, 19 November 2019.

Arturo Carlos Murillo Prijic (born 27 December 1963) is a Bolivian businessman, hotelier, and politician who served as the minister of government from 2019 to 2020. As a member of the National Unity Front, he previously served as a senator for Cochabamba from 2015 to 2019 and as a plurinominal member of the Chamber of Deputies from Cochabamba from 2006 to 2010.

Murillo was appointed at the tail end of the 2019 political crisis, and he quickly became characterized as one of the "strong men" of the Jeanine Áñez administration. Minutes after his inauguration, he announced the "hunt" for ex-officials of Evo Morales's government under various criminal charges and warned of severe consequences for acts of sedition. In May 2020, Murillo was alleged to be the ringleader in the tear gas case, in which the Ministries of Government and Defense were accused of irregularly purchasing non-lethal weapons at inflated prices. His refusal to cooperate with various criminal and legislative investigations was denounced by Attorney General José María Cabrera, whom the president dismissed at Murillo's behest. Cabrera's removal brought the scope of Murillo's influence over the president into question and led to the resignation of multiple ministers amid accusations that he was the "power behind the throne" of the Áñez administration. Murillo was called to hearings by the Plurinational Legislative Assembly but failed to present himself, ultimately resulting in his censure by the legislature. Per the terms of the Constitution, he was dismissed as minister but was reappointed the next day, exploiting a loophole in the document's text that Áñez had previously utilized in another minister's censure months prior.

After the 2020 general election, Murillo, along with Minister of Defense Luis Fernando López, fled the country three days before the inauguration of President-elect Luis Arce. He traveled to Panama from Brazil before arriving in the United States. In May 2021, the Federal Bureau of Investigation arrested him and four associates in Florida on criminal charges of conspiracy to commit money laundering. He was incarcerated in the Federal Detention Center in Miami until 2025, when he was released and subsequently deported to Bolivia.

== Early life and career ==
Arturo Murillo was born on 27 December 1963 in Cochabamba. He began working at the Victoria Hotel in Villa Tunari at the age of 14 and eventually became its owner. Murillo did not pursue university studies, and graduated with a bachelor's degree from the Center for Accelerated Secondary Education before entering the business sector of the hotel industry. Through that, he founded the Association of Hoteliers of the Tropic of Cochabamba and was a member of the Federation of Private Business Entities of Cochabamba. Both posts put Murillo into conflict with the cocalero activist Evo Morales whose political tactics, including roadblocks, seriously interrupted tourism in the Chapare Province.

== Political career ==
=== Chamber of Deputies ===
At the invitation of businessman Samuel Doria Medina, Murillo entered the political field in 2005 as a member of the National Unity Front (UN). In the 2005 general elections, he was elected as a deputy for the Cochabamba Department on a party list for the UN. During his term, Murillo was noted as a staunch critic of the now-president, Morales. Due to his condemnations, he claimed political persecution when in 2009, the Cochabamba Department of Tourism closed his Victoria Hotel, along with sixteen other hotels, having found that they had violated regulations by not having an operating license or keeping daily guest entry and exit reports.

=== Cochabamba mayoral election ===
In 2009, Murillo was absent from his party's parliamentary lists. Instead of seeking reelection, he directed his attention towards the 2010 Cochabamba mayoral election, facilitating his mayoral candidacy through the All for Cochabamba alliance, a coalition between UN and Popular Consensus. On 4 January 2010, he secured the support of the Social Democratic Power candidate Ninoska Lazarte, who agreed to withdraw her name from contention in exchange for the position of first municipal councilor. Through his candidacy, Murillo managed to form a broad bloc of opponents of Morales's Movimiento al Socialismo (MAS).

The mayoral race on 4 April remained too close to call for two days. On 6 April, the Departmental Court of Cochabamba released its official report, putting MAS candidate Edwin Castellanos in first place at 39.5%. Murillo came in second with 38%, losing by a one-point margin of 4,773 votes.

2010 Cochabamba mayoral election
Party	Votes	%
Movement for Socialism	123,097	39.54
All for Cochabamba (Note: Electoral alliance consisting of CP and UN.)	118,324	38.01
Solidarity Civic Unity	23,437	7.53
United Citizens	21,904	7.04
Front for Victory	11,230	3.61
Christian Democratic Party	6,132	1.97
Movement Without Fear	3,800	1.22
Revolutionary Nationalist Movement	3,386	1.09
Total	311,310	100.00
Valid votes	311,310	93.44
Invalid/blank votes	21,867	6.56
Total votes	333,177	100.00
Source: Plurinational Electoral Organ | Electoral Atlas

=== Chamber of Senators ===
After the 2010 elections, Murillo remained close with Doria Medina's party, eventually becoming UN's spokesman at the national level. He returned to the political scene in 2014 when UN, hedging its bets on ex-legislators to confront MAS, presented him as their candidate for first senator for Cochabamba as a member of the Democratic Unity (UD) coalition. In the 2014 general elections, Murillo was elected senator for Cochabamba, winning the position as the only opposition senator in the department.

==== Forged document case ====
In 2011, Murillo was met with allegations by the Ministry of Defense that he had forged his military service records in order to qualify before the National Electoral Court as a candidate in 2009. According to the ministry, the files in question were false because the numerical code they belonged to corresponded to another person. For this, the Ministries of Defense and Institutional Transparency filed criminal proceedings with the prosecutor's office against him for the crimes of filing a forged instrument and ideological falsehood. On 3 May 2016, the Fifth Sentencing Court of the Judicial District of La Paz, by unanimous vote, acquitted Murillo on the second charge but found him guilty on the first, sentencing him to two years in the San Pedro prison. In response, UN denounced the ruling as an "abuse of political power against democratic dissent", alleging that the judicial branch had become subject to the MAS, who sought to silence Murillo as the head of the Democratic Unity caucus in the Senate.

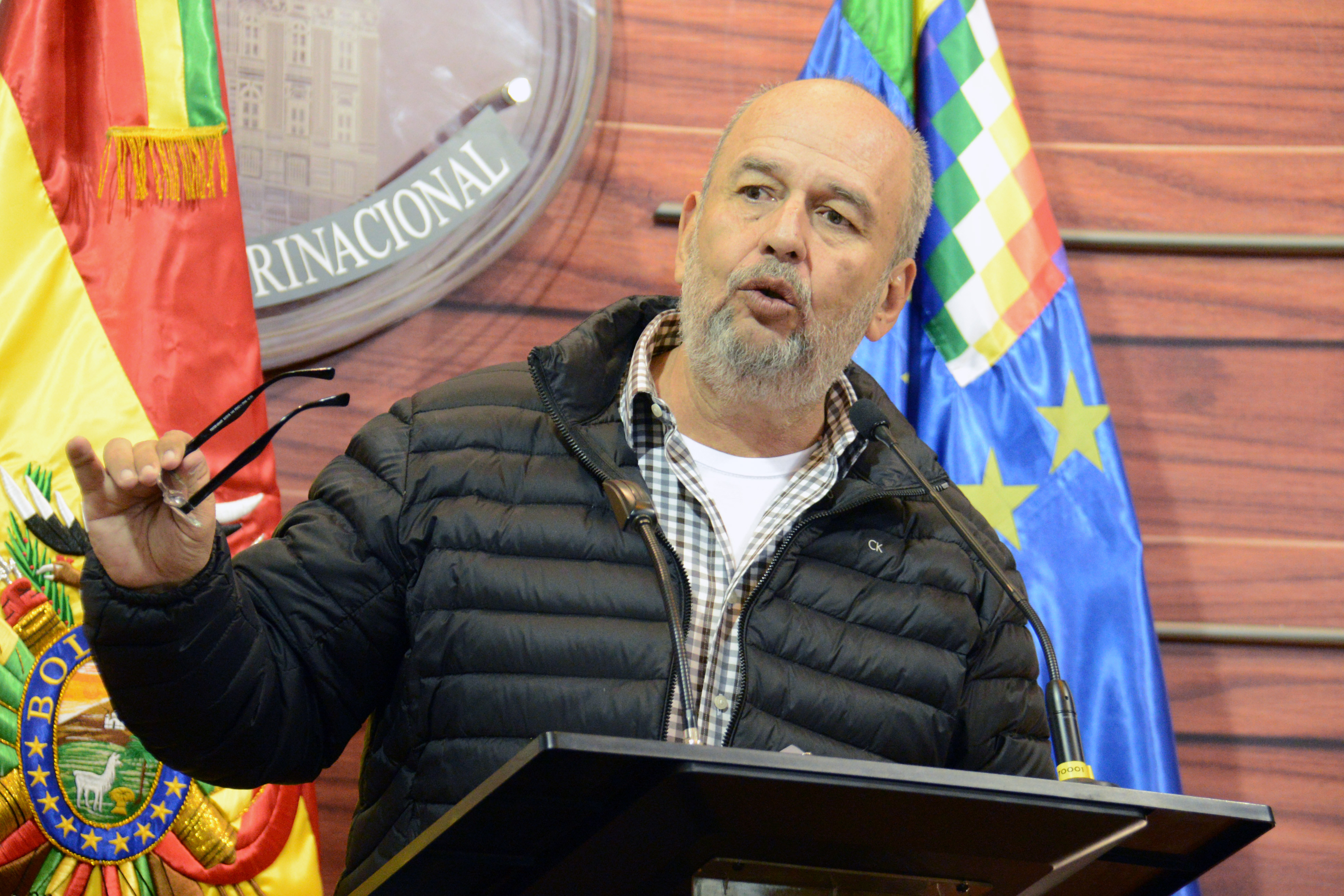
Senator Murillo delivers a press conference in the Legislative Assembly.

Murillo appealed the decision in October 2018, seeking the conviction's annulment under the justification that the falsehood of the documents had not been adequately demonstrated at the trial; the appeal took two years and five months to resolve. On 4 June 2021, the Supreme Tribunal of Justice re-affirmed the original sentence of two years. Had the ruling been released in 2019, it would have barred him from assuming office as minister of government.

==== Break with National Unity ====
Murillo announced that he had decided to leave the National Unity Front and retire from politics on 30 November 2018 as a result of the collapse of the DU coalition between National Unity and the Social Democratic Movement (MDS), which numerous members of both parties criticized. In his statement, he endorsed MDS senator Óscar Ortiz Antelo in his presidential bid and announced that he would not seek reelection, instead hoping to retire to his hotel business in Cochabamba.

==== Burning of the Hotel Victoria ====
Amid the wave of violence and social turmoil of the 2019 political crisis, on 11 November, Murillo denounced the burning of Hotel Victoria the night before. He alleged that his "work of more than twenty years" had been reduced to ashes by a mob of cocaleros and militants of the MAS "just because it belonged to [him]"; hours prior, Morales had been forced to resign due to nationwide protests. Murillo's family —three elderly people, including his sister; and two young girls, one one-year-old and the other six— spent eight days in hiding on the bank of a river in the Villa Tunari tropics before being rescued by a land and air police-military operation.

== Minister of Government ==
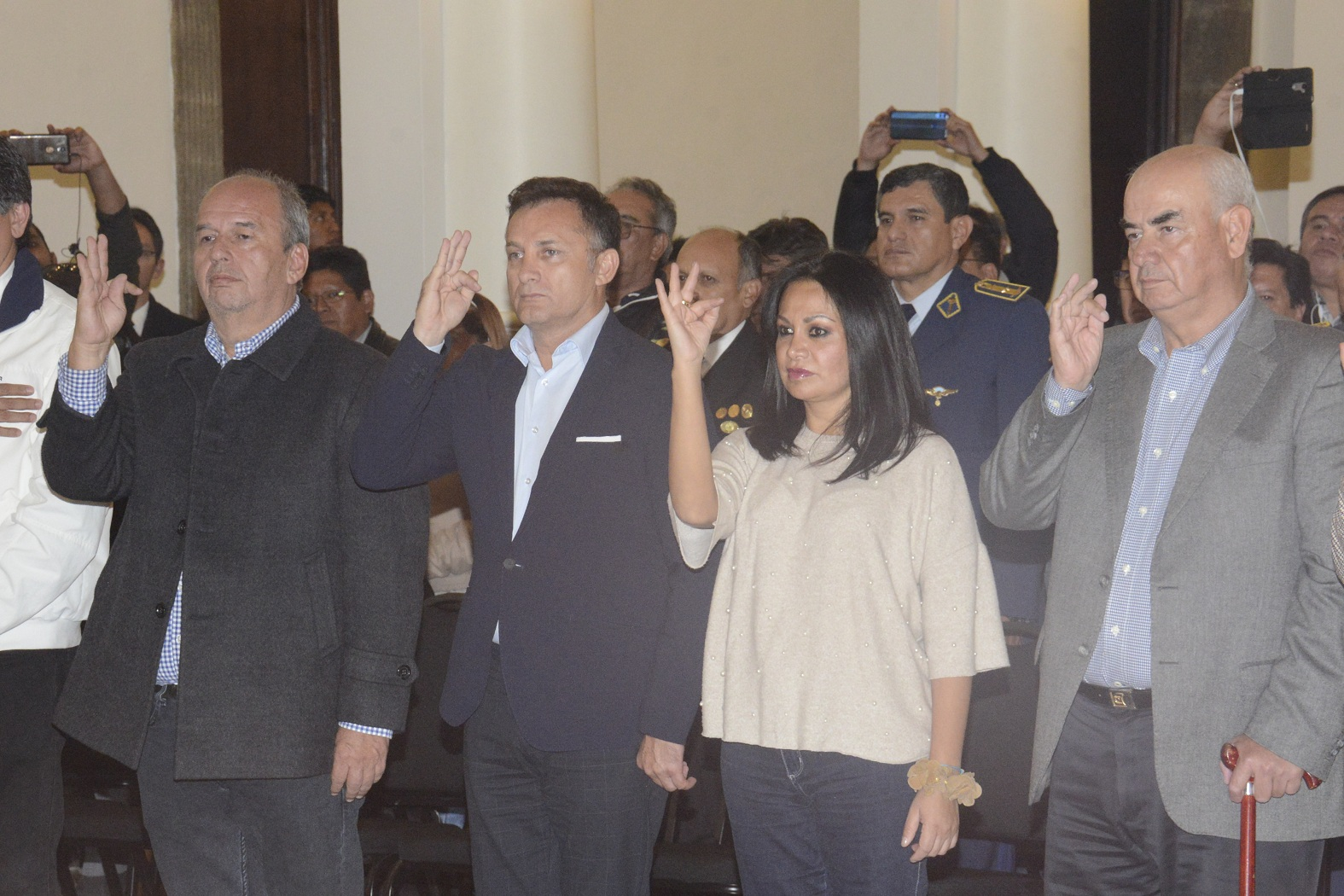
Murillo and other ministers are sworn in to the Áñez Cabinet, 13 November 2019.

Following Morales' resignation, opposition legislator Jeanine Áñez, a member of the UD alliance, legitimized her succession to the presidency and assumed office as the head of a transitional administration on 12 November. The following day, she appointed her ministerial cabinet, designating Murillo as minister of government. In an interview with Radio Fides on 31 May 2021, former minister of communication Roxana Lizárraga revealed that Murillo's appointment "did not have the backing of many of the [other] ministers […] because he believed that, as a minister of government, he had all the power in the world". However, she claimed that his entry into Áñez's cabinet had been sponsored by UN leader Samuel Doria Medina, who she confirmed had suggested Murillo for the position. Medina denied the allegations the following day, stating that he would not have had any motive to do so given Murillo's departure from UN in 2018.

During his time in office, Murillo signed the Madrid Charter and joined an alliance of right-wing and far-right politicians organized by the far-right Spanish political party Vox.

=== Processes against "sedition" ===
Soon after being sworn in, Murillo announced the "hunt" for the "seditious", stating that "this is not going to be a ministry of persecution […]. But whoever tries to be seditious from tomorrow, take care". In particular, he singled out Juan Ramón Quintana, ex-minister of the Morales government, whom he called "an animal that is killing people in our country". He ended his comments by warning that Quintana and other dissidents should "begin to run because [he is] going to catch them". On 25 November, the Prosecutor's Office issued an arrest warrant against Quintana on charges of sedition and terrorism, with further notices being issued for the ex-minister of cultures Wilma Alanoca.

In December, Murillo made the first visit of a transition official to the United States where he announced that an arrest warrant would be issued against Morales in the "next few hours" on charges of terrorism. At a press conference held on 8 January 2020, Murillo held up a pair of handcuffs before the media, stating, "here we are waiting for Mr. Evo Morales to come to Bolivia; here are the handcuffs to take him to Chonchocoro [prison, …] not because of politics, not because of persecution, [but] because [he is a] terrorist". The following day, Murillo requested the activation of an Interpol Red Notice in order to seek Morales's arrest abroad. Days later, the minister made further comments calling Morales a "confessed terrorist" and saying that he had a "cell with his name in Chonchocoro".

=== Senkata and Sacaba investigation ===
Following the events in Senkata and Sacaba, several legislators from the MAS announced their intent to file a request for interpellation in the Legislative Assembly for Murillo and Minister of Defense Luis Fernando López, in order to receive an oral report on the incidents which led to several deaths. In late December, President of the Senate Eva Copa stated that the interpellation would be held after the recess of the assembly, with President of the Chamber of Deputies Sergio Choque announcing on 3 January 2020 that the meetings had been scheduled for 11 and 12 January. In response, on 10 January, both Murillo and López presented justifications for why they could not attend the session, which were accepted by the legislature, who rescheduled it for 17 January. However, neither of the two presented themselves on that date, issuing further justifications for their absence. In view of this, the Chamber of Deputies approved on 19 February a formal request demanding that Áñez "instruct the ministers of State to comply with their constitutional duties".

=== Tear gas case ===
Murillo was implicated in another scandal when on 31 May 2020, the journalist Junior Arias disclosed accusations of irregular purchases of tear gas and other non-lethal equipment at highly inflated prices during the social conflicts of late 2019. According to the documents he presented, on 25 November 2019, the Ministry of Government requested the purchase of chemical agents from the Brazilian company Condor Tecnologias Não-Letais. The following day, it brought on the Miami-based company Bravo Tactical Solutions LLC as an intermediary. The minister of defense signed the contract on 19 December for an amount of US$5.6 million authorized by the Ministry of Economy. At that price, each tear gas cartridge would have cost between Bs250 and Bs270 (US$36.25 to US$39.15), more than double what other countries such as Venezuela had previously paid. On that day, the Ministry of Government released an official statement calling it a "false story […] built on the basis of irresponsible insinuations".

==== Investigation and non-compliance ====
The Plurinational Legislative Assembly formed a special mixed commission to investigate the alleged irregularities on 10 June. It was composed of two MAS senators and seven deputies, including three opposition legislators. Meanwhile, the prosecutor's office opened its own criminal investigation into the matter. On 24 June, the attorney general's office requested that the two accused ministries deliver documents regarding the administrative process of the purchase. By 17 September, Attorney General José María Cabrera, in his report to the legislative commission, stated that, while the Ministry of Defense had cooperated, "Minister Murillo has not presented a single sheet, a single piece of paper, to clarify his discharges in the tear gas case". Additionally, Commission President Plácida Espinoza reported that Murillo had delivered a note of excuse for his absence at legislative hearings. On the same day, Cabrera said that Murillo was attempting to arrange his dismissal with the president due to the investigation he was carrying out as well as his opposition to the privatization of the country's National Electrification Company (ENDE). AT 11:00 a.m. on 18 September, officials of the Ministry of the Presidency informed Cabrera that he had been dismissed and replaced by Alberto Javier Morales Vargas in accordance with Supreme Decree N° 4345-A. On 21 September, Murillo admitted to having requested Cabrera's removal from office, stating that the decision had been made under the justification that the former attorney general "has had secret meetings with the MAS […, he] has met with Eva Copa in secret to harm the government", though he provided no evidence to prove these claims. In response, Cabrera reaffirmed that his removal was purely due to the "fury of the minister of government" and warned that if Murillo had the power to have the attorney general removed, other judges might be discouraged from exercising their constitutional obligations.

==== Cabinet crisis ====
Following Cabrera's dismissal from his position, the ministers of economy and labor —Óscar Ortiz Antelo and Óscar Bruno Mercado— joined by Minister of Productive Development Abel Martínez, submitted their resignations on 28 September. In a press conference prior to his departure, Ortiz attributed his renunciation to "deep differences" with Murillo, who he claimed had pressured the cabinet into signing the decree nationalizing ENDE without a prior audit process. Later, Ortiz further outlined to Unitel that "there is a very serious problem, and that is that President Áñez has handed over the future of the government and the country to Minister Murillo, who is a person who does not have the capacity". Murillo, in turn, blamed the disagreements on "regionalism" between himself and the Cruceño ministers.

==== Censure, dismissal, and reinstatement ====
The assembly summoned Murillo to testify regarding his role in the tear gas case in a plenary session scheduled for 13 October. Murillo failed to attend, delivering a note of excuse on the grounds that he was preoccupied receiving a representative of the Organization of American States. The assembly refused to accept it, arguing that the task of receiving foreign delegations was a job for the Foreign Ministry, with Senator Copa accusing Murillo of "usurping functions". As a result, Murillo —along with Minister of Education Víctor Hugo Cárdenas, who had also failed to appear to an unrelated hearing— was censured by the legislature. According to Article 158 of the Constitution, such a vote entailed the removal of the targeted officials from office. A similar case occurred in March when Minister López had been censured, dismissed, and reappointed the following day due to the fact that "the Constitution does not prohibit the [censured] minister from returning". This time, the MAS argued that such a loophole could not be exploited because, in August, the assembly had passed a law rectifying the ambiguity by specifying the dismissal of a censured minister within twenty-four hours and their prohibition from holding office for a period of three years. The Áñez administration argued that, while the president of the Senate had promulgated the law, it hadn't been published in the Official Gazette of the State and, therefore, "from a strictly legal point of view, this […, law] is not in force".

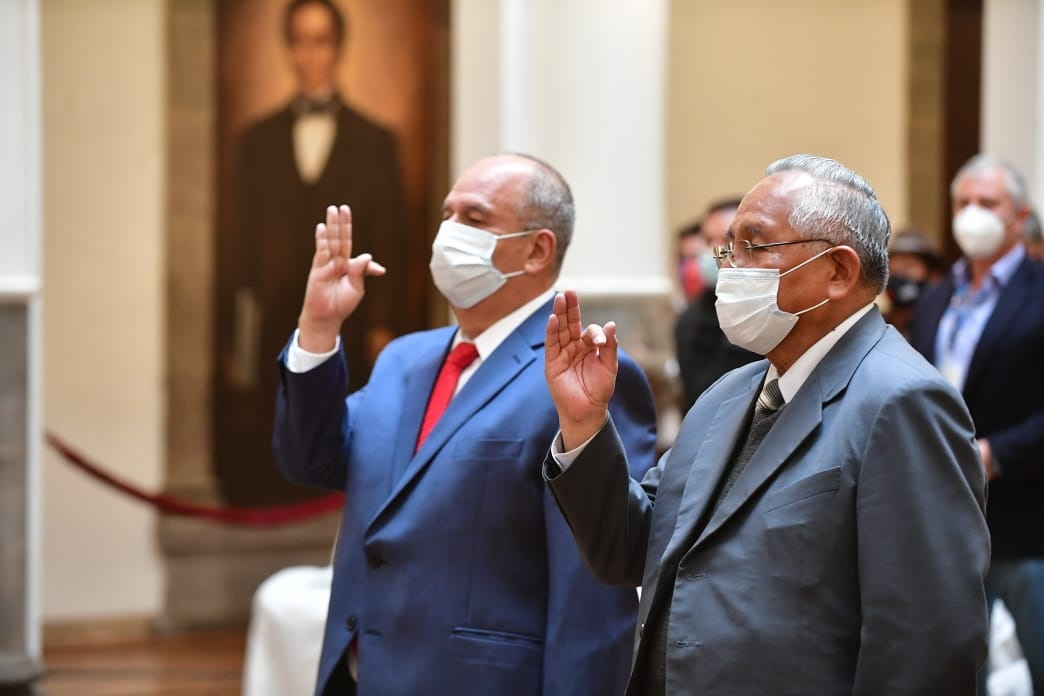
Murillo and Cárdenas are sworn in to their posts, 20 October 2020.

Following his censure, Murillo affirmed that he would remain in office until the moment the assembly officially notified the Ministry of the Presidency. Copa responded by calling the minister's refusal to step down a "clear violation of the Constitution" and decried that "Murillo has a psychological problem because he is very exalted, he is very arrogant, he exacerbates people for no reason". Murillo responded, saying "if there is no notification [the censure] is useless; Mrs. Copa can cry, she can stomp, pull her hair, it is useless. It seems as if she was in love with me; the lady has to calm down a little; I respectfully tell her to calm down". After some days, Áñez dismissed Murillo and Cárdenas on 19 October, replacing the former with Vice Minister of Public Security Wilson Santamaría. Initial indications suggested that, unlike with the case of López, the dismissal of Murillo would be permanent. The former minister reported that his first move would be "at least thirty days of vacation […]. I want to rest, sleep a lot, it was a very exhausting work in these eleven months". He also implied he might leave the country, stating that he could do so "for as long as I want, whenever I want. Surely I will, on vacation […]. I have not stolen, I have not killed, I have not murdered. If they want to persecute me and imprison me, they will find me at my house; I am not afraid of that". Meanwhile, Santamaría stated that he would accompany Áñez until the end of her mandate.

Despite this, Murillo's removal was short-lived as both he and Cárdenas were reappointed to their positions the following day. At their reappointment, Áñez specified that the ministers would accompany her to the end of her term and reiterated her trust in Murillo's management.

== Flight and arrest in the U.S. ==
Nearing the end of Áñez's transitional government, the prosecutor's office accused both Murillo and López of crimes of improper use of influence, negotiations incompatible with the exercise of public functions by individuals, contracts harmful to the State, and breach of duties, with anti-corruption prosecutor Luis Fernando Atanacio Fuentes issuing a formal request for an immigration alert against the pair in order to avoid their preemptive departure from the country. On 5 November 2020, Murillo presented his letter of definitive resignation from office in which he lauded his management's accomplishments and declared his task concluded. According to outgoing Minister of Economy Branko Marinković, both Murillo and López had presented their resignations "days before". Neither were present for Áñez's final presidential address, which was attended by the rest of her ministers.

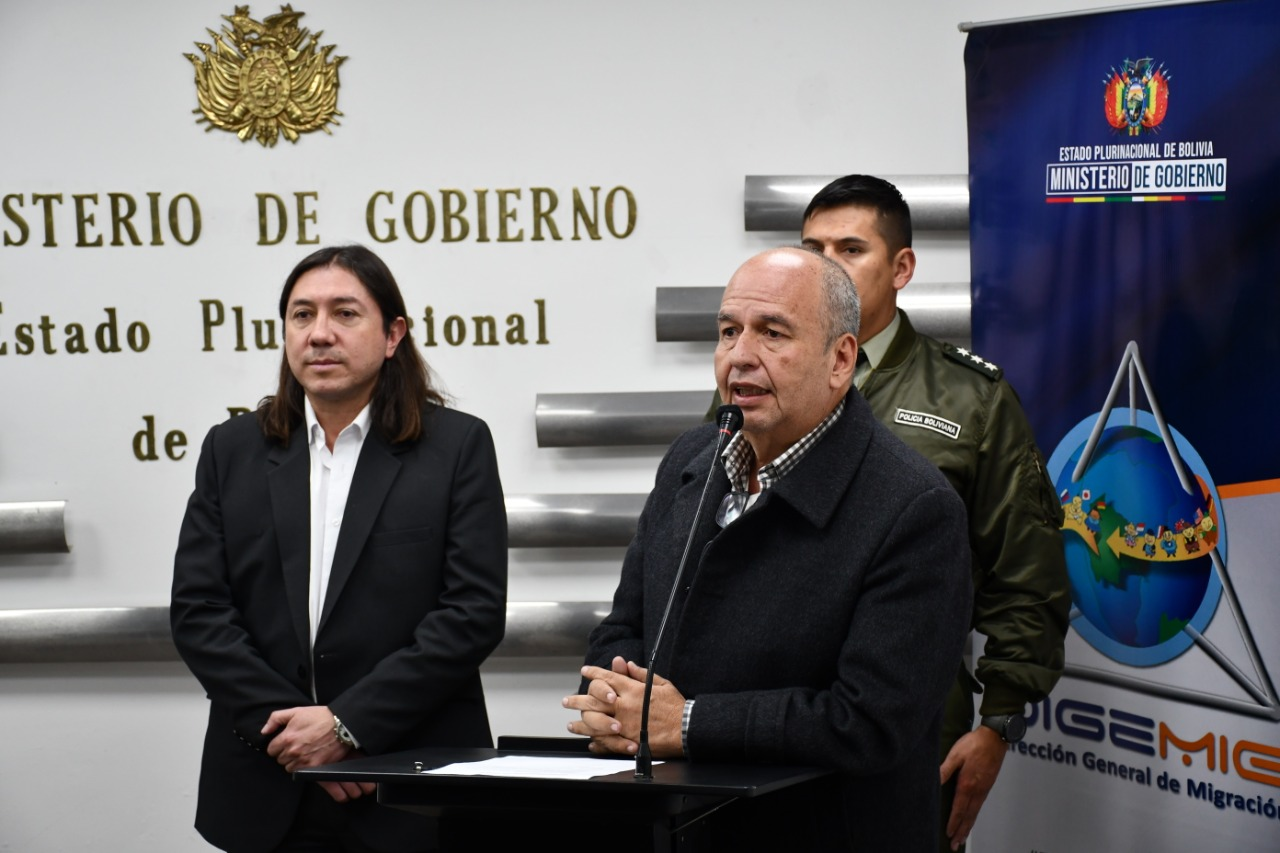
Marcel Rivas (left) was arrested for facilitating Murillo's escape from the country.

The whereabouts of Murillo and López remained unclear for some days, leading the prosecutor's office to request a report from the General Directorate of Migration on whether either of the former ministers had fled the country. On 16 November, it issued an arrest warrant against both of them on the grounds that "there are indications that the accused may hide, flee, or leave the country". The following day, Police Commander Johnny Aguilera reported that Murillo and López departed on a FAB-046 plane from El Trompillo Airport on 5 November, arriving in Santa Cruz, from where they crossed the border through Puerto Suárez and into Brazil. After that, they would have traveled on foot through areas without immigration control until arriving at Corumbá. According to Colonel Pablo García, director of Interpol-Bolivia, López "used his last two days as an authority [to gain a] last favor" from members of the military, who secured the plane for their escape. As a result of these events, the former head of the General Directorate of Migration, Marcel Rivas, was apprehended on 19 November, with the prosecutor's office accusing him of aiding the flight of the ex-ministers. Three more officials —subordinates of the general directorate in offices in Puerto Quijarro and Puerto Suárez— were arrested on 21 November. While López remained in Brazil, Murillo left the country on a commercial flight from São Paulo and arrived in Panama at 5:45 a.m. on 9 November. He would have remained there for at least seven days in order to carry out a mandated quarantine period. On 5 January 2021, Prosecutor General Juan Lanchipa reported that Murillo had been in the United States since 12 November. The following day, the prosecutor's office announced its intent to indict Murillo and López on charges of breach of duties and improper use of influence, among other crimes relating to the tear gas case, in order to facilitate the activation of a Red Notice from Interpol. The indictment was formalized two days later.

=== Incarceration in Florida ===
On 26 May, the United States Department of Justice (DOJ) released a statement announcing that the Federal Bureau of Investigation had arrested Murillo and four other individuals in the states of Florida and Georgia between 21 and 22 May. Aside from Murillo, those arrested were Sergio Méndez, former chief of staff of the Ministry of Government; Bryan Berkman, CEO of Bravo Tactical Solutions LLC; his father, Luis Berkman; and Philip Lichtenfeld. The two Bolivians and three Americans were charged with one count of conspiracy to commit money laundering under allegations that Murillo participated in a bribery scheme related to the tear gas case. According to the DOJ, the three Florida-based American businessmen paid a total of $602,000 in bribes to Murillo, Méndez, and one other government official in exchange for the $5.6 million contract with the Ministry of Defense for the procurement of tear gas and other non-lethal military equipment. If convicted, they all face a maximum penalty of twenty years.

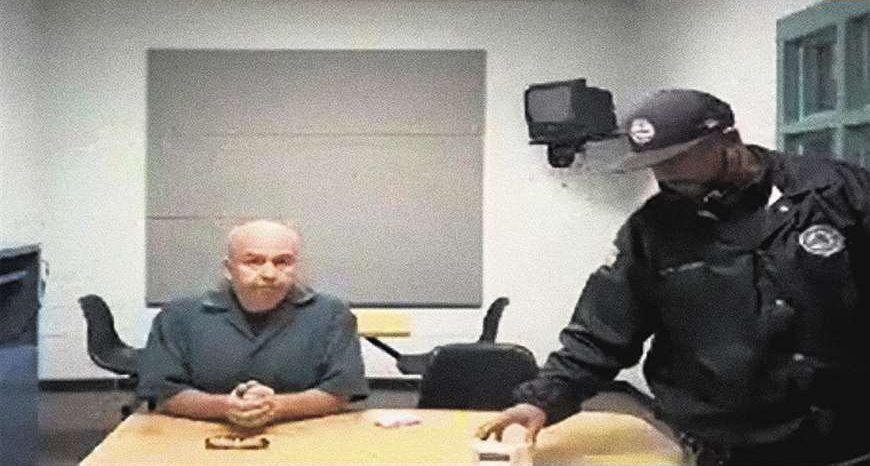
Murillo detained at the Federal Detention Center in Miami, 2021.

On the same day as Murillo's arrest announcement, his former brother-in-law, Daniel Aliss Paredes, was detained after withdrawing money and valuables from a safe held in the ex-minister's name. The following day, Bolivian police raided the Cochabamba properties of Murillo, Méndez, and Paredes, seeking to collect evidence regarding the tear gas case. Murillo's successor, Minister of Government Eduardo del Castillo, reported that officers had found firearms, ammunition, and firearm boxes, as well as trace amounts of marijuana and a smoking pipe at his house. Three vehicles owned by the former minister were seized. At around 10:00 a.m. on 28 May, officers arrested Murillo's sister and Aliss Paredes' ex-wife, Mireya Murillo, on charges of legitimizing illicit profits.

Soon after Murillo's arrest, former president Áñez, who has been incarcerated in the Miraflores jail since March 2021, denounced her former minister, stating on her Twitter that "corruption is an issue that I never accepted in my government; unfortunately, there were officials who distanced themselves from all ethics. Nobody chooses collaborators to be corrupted, and these acts have to be punished with the full weight of the law because they make the country look bad". Shortly after, former minister of the presidency Jerjes Justiniano accused Áñez of having known of the corruption from at least December and at most February and alleged that it would have been very difficult for the former president to have been unaware of such actions.

Murillo appeared for a virtual hearing in the Southern District Court of Florida on 26 May. After 21 minutes, it was suspended and a preliminary hearing date was set for 7 June. Two days later, the Bolivian Prosecutor's Office began the process of requesting Murillo's extradition from the U.S. for trial in Bolivia, while del Castillo announced that the Bolivian government would look for representatives to send to his hearings. After negotiations, Murillo's lawyers secured an agreement with the U.S. Attorney's Office to postpone his hearing from 7 June to 9 July. Before that could happen, the attorney's office requested the postponement of the hearing to 9 August, and on that date, it was delayed again to 8 September due to the "unusual complexity" of the case, and his bail was set at $250,000. After that, Murillo's defense requested a further delay to 8 October before deciding to waive the preliminary hearing entirely and move directly to the prosecution, granting him another month in order to gather evidence for the case. Although Bolivian Attorney General Wilfredo Chávez reported that the 8 November date would be the "last postponement", it was further deferred one final time to 8 December. In the meantime, Chávez reported on 28 September that the other four individuals indicted in the case had pleaded guilty.

==== Trial in the United States ====
Murillo opted to plead not guilty, causing his case to be moved to trial. In January 2022, the court accepted Murillo's defense's request for more time to prepare for the trial. In October 2022, he pleaded guilty to conspiracy to launder bribes in the case. On January 5, 2023, Murillo was sentenced to five years and ten months in prison.

==== Charges in Bolivia ====
On 13 January 2022, Lanchipa announced that the prosecutor's office had formally filed accusations against both Murillo and López on charges of improper use of influence, negotiations incompatible with the exercise of public functions and non-compliant with duties, contracts harmful to the State, uneconomical conduct, and illicit enrichment of individuals affecting the State. In addition to the two ministers, those accused are: the former director of administrative affairs of the Ministry of Government, Sergio Alberto Zamora; former director of Legal Affairs of the Ministry of Defense, Raúl López; former head of the Legal Analysis Unit of the Ministry of Defense, Alan Menacho; former director of logistics, Pedro Rea; former director-general of administrative affairs, Ruth Palomeque; former head of class 5 articles of the Ministry of Defense, Dennis Vera; and CEO of Bravo Tactical Solutions LLC, Bryan Berkman. At a press conference, Lanchipa affirmed that the State would seek a maximum sentence for the accused, entailing ten years plus aggravating circumstances.

In June 2023, the Third Tribunal of Anticorruption of Santa Cruz, ordered Murillo's arrest on charges related to "use of influences and false accusations and testimonies".

==== Deportation to Bolivia ====
In June 2025, Murillo was released from prison in Miami, only to be rearrested shortly after by the ICE for deportation. After a judge rejected his appeal on July 29, Murillo was deported from the United States back to Bolivia on September 3. He was placed under arrest upon arrival in Santa Cruz Department the next day and transported to La Paz.

== Electoral history ==
Year	Office	Party	Alliance	Votes			Result
Year	Office	Party	Alliance	Total	%	P.	Result
2005	Deputy	National Unity Front	None	28,689	5.55%	3rd (Note: Presented on an electoral list. The data shown represents the share of the vote the entire party/alliance received in that constituency.)	Won
2010	Mayor	National Unity Front	All for Cochabamba	118,324	38.01%	2nd	Lost
2014	Senator	National Unity Front	Democratic Unity	186,346	19.50%	2nd	Won
Source: Plurinational Electoral Organ | Electoral Atlas

Senate of Bolivia
Preceded by Lenny Zaconeta	Senator for Cochabamba; 2015–2020	Succeeded by Carmen Rosa; Guzmán
Political offices
Preceded by Carlos Romero	Minister of Government; 2019–2020	Succeeded by Wilson Santamaría; Acting
Preceded by Wilson Santamaría; Acting	Minister of Government; 2020	Succeeded by Eduardo del Castillo
