= Wilson Santamaría =

Bolivian politician (born 1981)

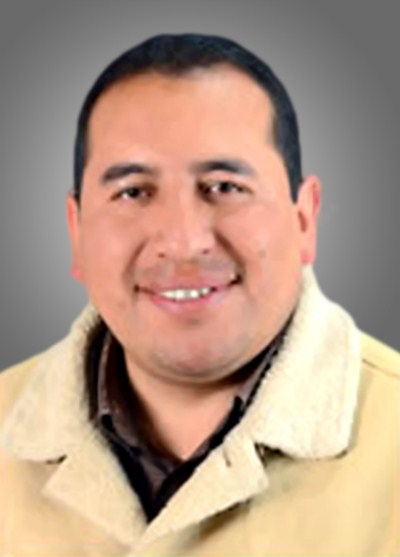
- Official portrait, 2017

Minister of Government
- Acting
- In office 19 October 2020 – 20 October 2020
- President: Jeanine Áñez
- Preceded by: Arturo Murillo
- Succeeded by: Arturo Murillo

Vice Minister of Public Security
- In office 19 November 2019 – 5 November 2020
- President: Jeanine Áñez
- Minister: Arturo Murillo
- Preceded by: Wilfredo Chávez
- Succeeded by: Gonzalo Lazcano

Member of the Chamber of Deputies from La Paz
- In office 18 January 2015 – 19 November 2019
- Substitute: Rufina Cladera
- Preceded by: Ana María Sempértegui
- Succeeded by: Rufina Cladera
- Constituency: Party list

Personal details
- Born: Wilson Pedro Santamaría Choque; 9 September 1981 (age 45) La Paz, Bolivia
- Party: Somos Pueblo (from 2019)
- Other political affiliations: National Unity Front (until 2019)
- Education: Higher University of San Andrés
- Occupation: Lawyer; politician; sociologist

Wilson Pedro Santamaría Choque (born 9 September 1981) is a Bolivian lawyer, politician, and sociologist who served as vice minister of public security from 2019 to 2020. A graduate of the Higher University of San Andrés with extensive postgraduate studies, Santamaría entered the political field as a partisan of the National Unity Front and served as the party's municipal leader for La Paz. In 2014, he was elected as a party-list member of the Chamber of Deputies, representing the La Paz Department from 2015 to 2019.

In parliament, Santamaría split with National Unity, reorienting himself towards the Social Democratic Movement and establishing a close personal relationship with colleague Rafael Quispe, whose party, Somos Pueblo, he joined. Following a failed second term bird in 2019, Santamaría entered the Áñez administration as vice minister of public security and served briefly as acting minister of government for a day between the removal and reinstatement of Arturo Murillo. Upon the conclusion of his tenure, Santamaría supported the gubernatorial campaign of Quispe and ran unsuccessfully for a seat in the La Paz Departmental Legislative Assembly.

== Early life and education ==
Wilson Santamaría was born on 9 September 1981 in La Paz. He graduated as a lawyer and sociologist from the Higher University of San Andrés and received a diploma in higher education from the institute's Center for Psychopedagogy and Research in Higher Education. He later completed specialization courses in public administration and economic development at the University of Valle and Bolivian Catholic University, respectively, before traveling abroad to Spain, where he received a master's in development planning and sustainable management.

== Chamber of Deputies ==
=== Election ===
An active partisan of the National Unity Front (UN), Santamaría served as the party's municipal leader for La Paz. In 2014, he was elected to represent the Department of La Paz in the Chamber of Deputies on behalf of the Democratic Unity (UD) coalition, an alliance between UN and the Social Democratic Movement (MDS). As part of their shared pact, UN and the MDS had given one another ample autonomy to define their own electoral lists in the regions where they held the highest presence, giving La Paz-based UN greater sway over UD's candidates in the department.

=== Tenure ===
Entering parliament, Santamaría was selected to serve as deputy leader of the UD caucus for the 2016–2017 term. Promoted to full leader the following year, Santamaría's term contended with the eternal divisions of the UD caucus, a grouping that operated less as a unified force and more as a collection of competing parties. Given the task of wrangling opposing factions, Santamaría faced criticism for his apathetic leadership style, opting to travel abroad while legislators back home squabbled amongst themselves over important committee assignments.

As his term went on, Santamaría progressively disassociated himself from UN. He resigned as the party's municipal leader in 2018 and ceased participating in internal party meetings altogether just a few months later. Simultaneously, he also developed relations with partisans of the MDS, supporting the election of one of its members, Gonzalo Barrientos, to succeed him as caucus leader. However, Santamaría's most important relationships were with other independently minded UD deputies. In particular, he, along with Amilcar Barral and Rafael Quispe, were noted as having "closed ranks as a trio," with the former two having previously defended Quispe in court years prior. When Santamaría definitively split from UN in early 2019, he did not join the MDS but rather became a member of Quispe's party, Somos Pueblo.

With the campaign underway for the 2019 general election, Santamaría and Quispe joined forces with the MDS to support the presidential candidacy of Oscar Ortiz. While Quispe bided his time with a view toward contesting the La Paz governorship, Santamaría sought reelection to the Chamber of Deputies. However, he was denied a second term at the ballot box amid a nationwide underperformance for the MDS, which took home fourth nationally and dropped to fifth in La Paz.

=== Commission assignments ===
- Constitution, Legislation, and Electoral System Commission
  - Democracy and Electoral System Committee (2016–2019)
- Planning, Economic Policy, and Finance Commission
  - Science and Technology Committee (2019)
- Territorial Organization of the State and Autonomies Commission
  - Rural Native Indigenous Autonomies Committee (2015–2016)

== Later political career ==
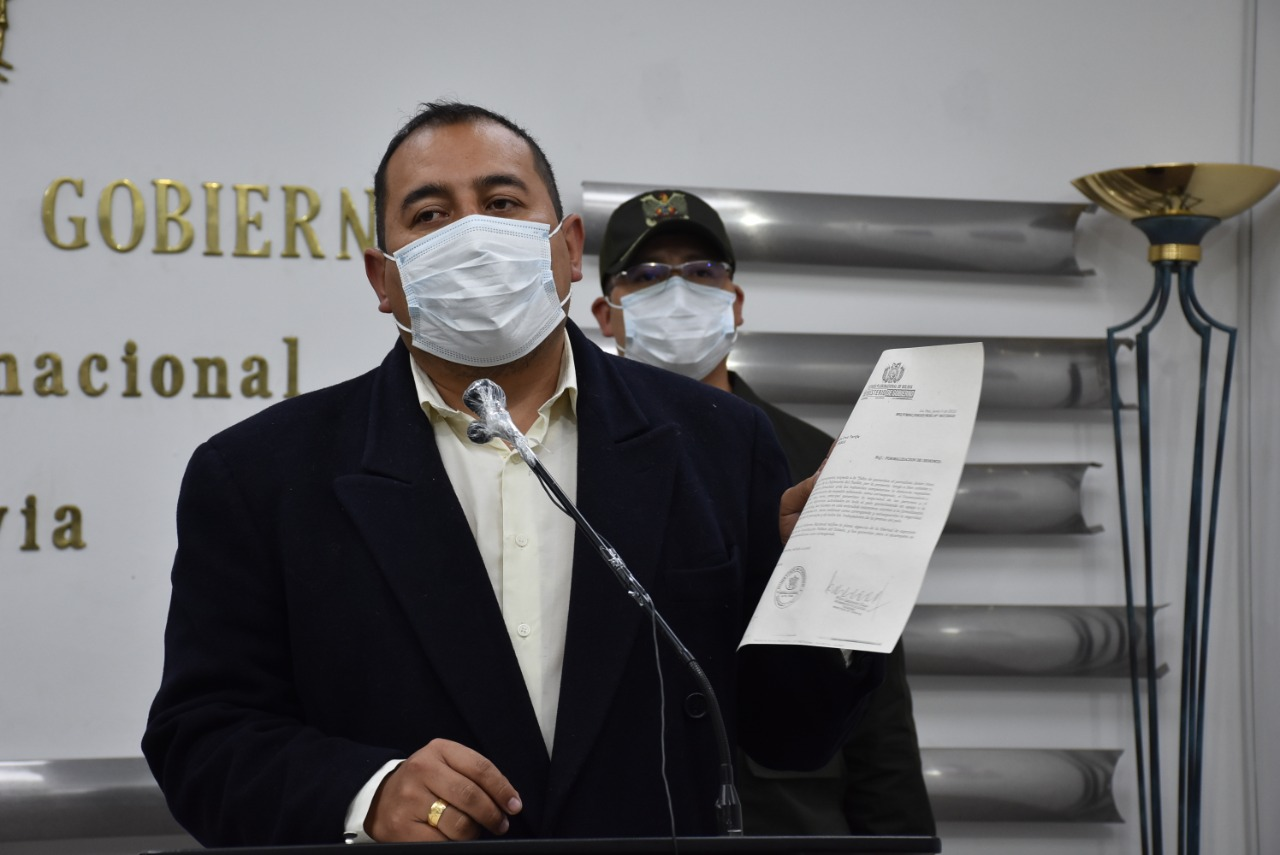
Santamaría delivers remarks to media outlets at a press conference.

Despite the loss, Santamaría's political prospects soon rebounded as allegations of electoral fraud provoked the collapse of the Evo Morales administration. Following the accession of MDS Senator Jeanine Áñez to the presidency, Santamaría was appointed to serve in the Ministry of Government as vice minister of public security. His yearlong tenure was exceptionally busy, as he oversaw efforts to maintain public security amid continued social unrest, efforts by the transitional government to detain and prosecute former ruling party officials, and, later, state enforcement of quarantine measures amid the COVID-19 pandemic—as well as routine work to crack down on crime and delinquency.

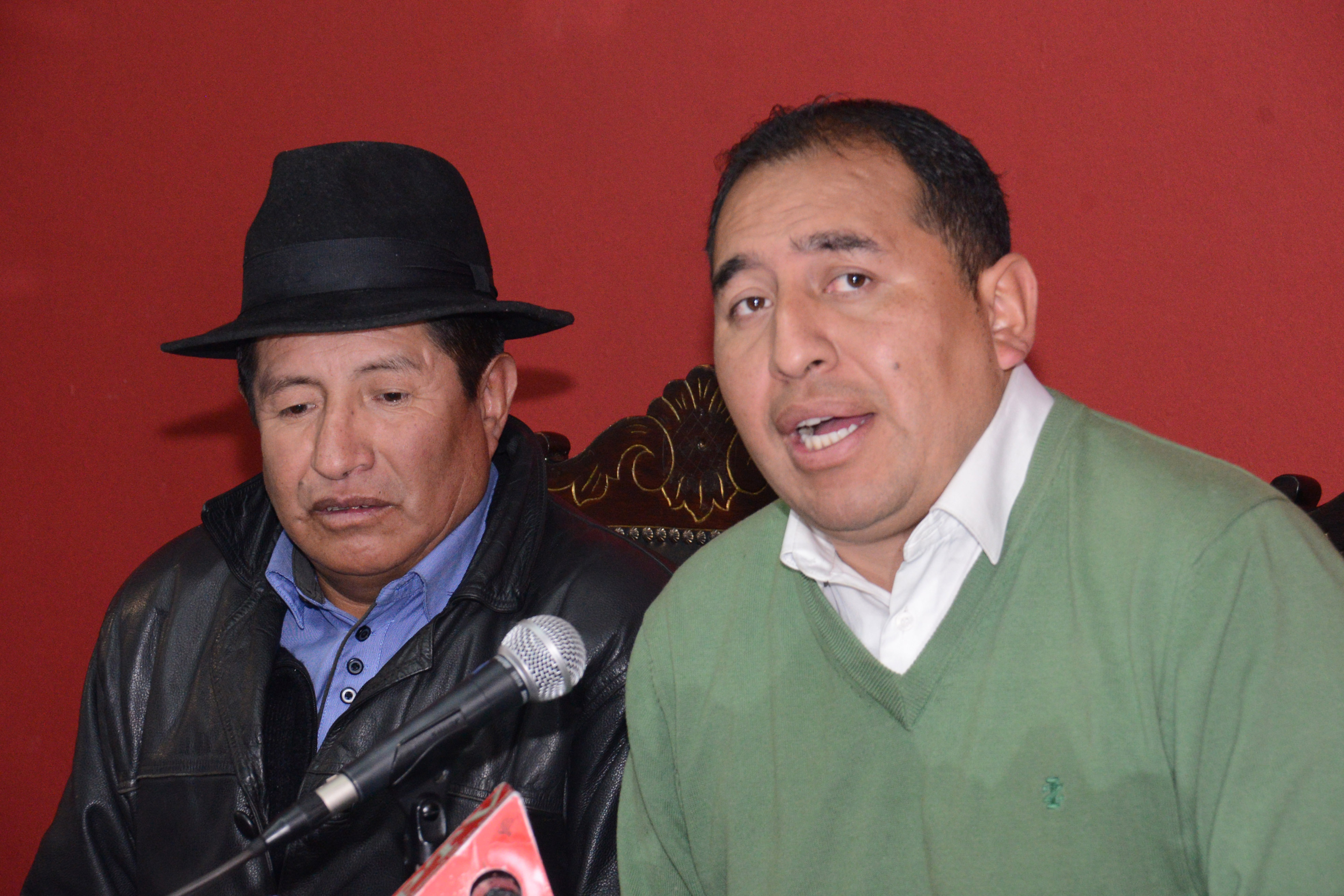
Quispe and Santamaría were frequent political collaborators.

Right-hand to Minister Arturo Murillo, Santamaría assumed office as acting minister of government following Murillo's censure and removal by the Legislative Assembly. Despite initial expectations that he would remain in the position for the duration of the transition, Santamaría ultimately held the post for just one day, as Áñez soon reversed course and reappointed Murillo. As the transitional government's work drew to a close, Santamaría submitted his resignation on 5 November, leaving office a few days before the formal transition of power.

With his vice-ministerial tenure concluded, Santamaría returned to electoral politics, participating in the launch of Rafael Quispe's 2021 gubernatorial bid. For the accompanying municipal election, Santamaría was considered as a possible La Paz mayoral candidate on behalf of Somos Pueblo. He came close to receiving the nomination, appearing on Quispe's shortlist of potential candidates, alongside Eduardo León and Iván Arias, who ultimately won the nomination and, later, the mayoralty. Blocked out of contesting the mayoralty himself, Santamaría instead accompanied Quispe in the gubernatorial race, seeking a seat in the La Paz Departmental Legislative Assembly. Although Somos Pueblo's not-insignificant third-place finish did net it representation in the legislature, Santamaría's bottom-of-the-list placement on the party's electoral slate meant that he was not among those elected.

== Electoral history ==
Electoral history of Wilson Santamaría
Year	Office	Party	Alliance	Votes			Result	Ref.
Year	Office	Party	Alliance	Total	%	P.	Result	Ref.
2014	Deputy	National Unity Front	Democratic Unity	215,360	14.75%	2nd (Note: Presented on an electoral list. The data shown represents the share of the vote the entire party/alliance received in that constituency.)	Won	
2019	Deputy	Somos Pueblo	Bolivia Says No	19,892	1.19%	5th	Annulled	
2021	Assemblyman	Somos Pueblo	PBC-SP	222,170	20.87%	3rd	Lost	
Source: Plurinational Electoral Organ | Electoral Atlas

Chamber of Deputies of Bolivia
Preceded by Ana María Sempértegui	Member of the Chamber of Deputies from La Paz; 2015–2019	Succeeded by Rufina Cladera
Preceded by Lourdes Millares	Leader of the Chamber of Deputies; Democratic Unity Caucus; 2017–2018	Succeeded by Gonzalo Barrientos
Government offices
Preceded by Wilfredo Chávez	Vice Minister of Public Security; 2019–2020	Succeeded by Gonzalo Lazcano
Political offices
Preceded by Arturo Murillo	Minister of Government; Acting; 2020	Succeeded by Arturo Murillo
