= Ana María Sempértegui =

Bolivian politician (born 1958)

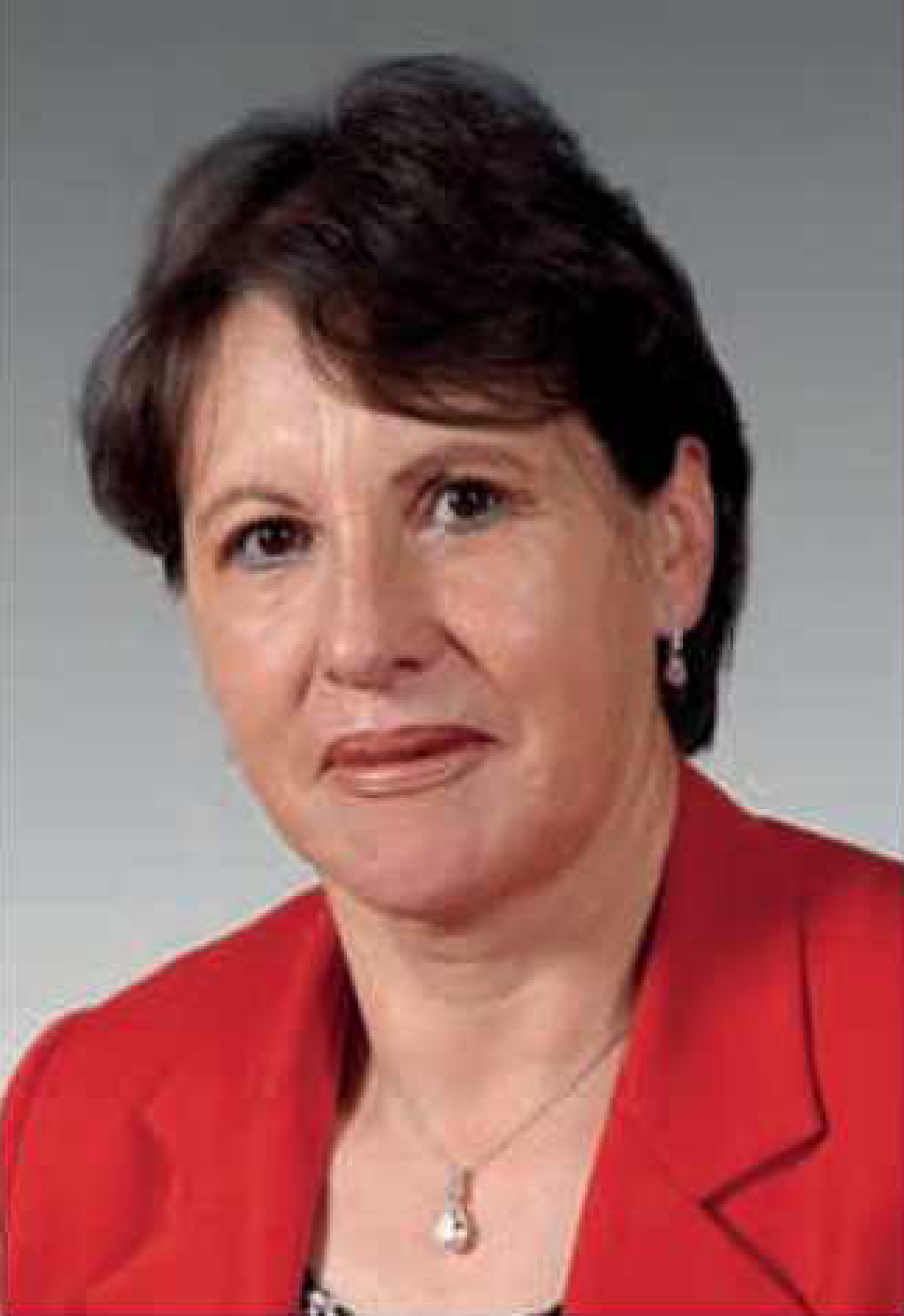
- Official portrait, 2014

Member of the Chamber of Deputies from La Paz
- In office 19 January 2010 – 18 January 2015
- Substitute: Andrés Ortega (2010–2014) (Note: Resigned from office.); Sergio Fernando Ascarrunz (2014–2015)
- Preceded by: Jorge Solari
- Succeeded by: Wilson Santamaría
- Constituency: Party list

Personal details
- Born: Ana María Sempértegui Valdez; 15 December 1958 (age 67) Potosí, Bolivia
- Party: Plan Progress for Bolivia
- Education: Tomás Frías University
- Occupation: Accountant; politician

Ana María Sempértegui Valdez (born 15 December 1958) is a Bolivian accountant and politician who served as a party-list member of the Chamber of Deputies from La Paz from 2010 to 2015.

Sempértegui was born into a mining family native to Potosí. She graduated as an accountant from Tomás Frías University and worked in the administrative area of the Potosí Development Corporation from the mid- to late 1980s. Following a brief retirement to focus on family, Sempértegui returned to the private sector, now in the city of La Paz. She held administrative and financial positions at various companies from 1995 to 2000 and 2008 to 2009.

In 2000, Sempértegui was hired as a minor public official in the El Alto municipal government. She became a close confidant to José Luis Paredes, who appointed her as his advisor in the mayor's office. She was kept on board following Paredes's ascent as prefect in 2006 and remained in administration through his fall from power in 2008. Despite her lack of political experience, Paredes included Sempértegui on National Convergence's parliamentary list in 2009 as part of his quota of candidates. Given his exile, she was not re-nominated in 2014.

== Early life and career ==
=== Early life and education ===
Ana María Sempértegui was born on 15 December 1958 in Potosí to a family of humble means involved in the department's mining industry. She was one of seven children – three girls and four boys – born to Héctor Sempértegui Toro, a mine mechanic stationed at Pailaviri, and his wife Elena Valdez Tardío, a career homemaker.

Sempértegui attended the Jaime Mendoza School for most of primary and received her intermediate school education at the 31 de Octubre Educational Unit, located on Antofagasta Avenue in the railway zone of Potosí. Both institutes were dependent on the Bolivian Mining Corporation and catered exclusively to the children of mineworkers.

She then enrolled at the women's lyceum Sucre, where she received her secondary baccalaureate. After graduating, Sempértegui was accepted into Tomás Frías University, where she studied to become an accountant. She graduated with a licentiate in public accounting – the first in her family to be awarded a professional degree.

=== Accounting and business career ===
Sempértegui worked in administration at the Potosí Development Corporation (CORDEPO) from 1985 to 1986. Following the death of her father, she and her mother moved to Argentina to stay with family. She gained employment as a bookseller in Buenos Aires before being brought on as an accounting clerk at Termas Villavicencio but ultimately opted to accompany her mother's return trip to Bolivia.

Resettled in Potosí, Sempértegui returned to her previous job at CORDEPO between 1988 and 1989. Following her marriage, she retired from her profession to raise their three children. She accompanied her husband's postings to Monteagudo and later La Paz, where they settled and she reentered the workforce. Over the next half-decade, Sempértegui worked for several private sector corporations: at Copla, an import-export company, from 1995 and 1996, and at the construction companies Ormachea and América from 1997 to 1998 and 1998 to 2000, respectively.

=== Public official ===
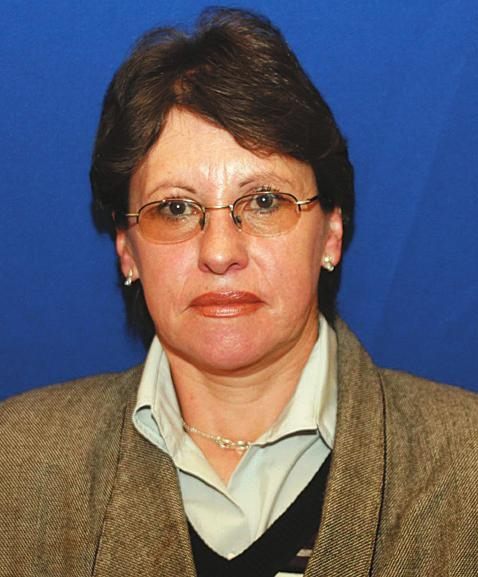
Official portrait, 2010

Sempértegui's late entrance into politics began indirectly. Encouraged by her husband, she answered a public tender to work at the El Alto municipal government and was brought on as an administrative assistant at the Chief Financial Administrative Office. She became a close personal confidant to then-mayor José Luis Paredes, who appointed her general advisor of the El Alto Mayor's Office, a post she held throughout his two terms in office between 2000 and 2005.

Paredes was elected prefect of the La Paz Department in 2005 and, with his ascent to office early the following year, brought on Sempértegui to an advisory position within the new administration. She stayed on board for the duration of Paredes's term, resigning with the rest of the prefect's staff in 2008, after his successful recall and subsequent removal.

In the ensuing years, Sempértegui returned to the private sector as the administrative manager and financial controller of automotive manufacturer Toyosa from 2008 to 2009. At the same time, she also maintained a presence in the civil service as a consultant for the La Paz municipal government, as well as her ties to Paredes, as his personal accountant.

== Chamber of Deputies ==
=== Election ===
In the leadup to the 2009 election, Paredes invited Sempértegui to join the National Convergence (CN) ticket as a candidate for parliament. In effect, Paredes's party, Plan Progress for Bolivia (PPB), granted CN the legal backing it needed to compete – giving him great latitude to select candidates as he saw fit. Just as he had done in 2005, Paredes placed members of his innermost circle – up to and including relatives – in the "safety zone" of CN's slate of candidates, regardless of past political experience or public notoriety. As a result, Sempértegui was elected to the Chamber of Deputies, accompanied by two other members of PPB affiliated with Paredes – his former cabinet secretary, Alejandro Zapata, and his own son, Hernán Paredes.

=== Tenure ===
No sooner did the elections come to pass than CN – devoid of either clear leadership or ideological coherence – fell apart as an effective parliamentary alliance. In La Paz, the flight of Paredes – accosted on all sides by criminal cases and investigations – left the band of legislators elected under his watch to fend for themselves. In the aftermath of the former prefect's exile, Sempértegui recalled: "I had to carry out my term practically alone".

In legislation, Sempértegui's tenure made headway in the development of children's rights law. She was the main drafter behind a 2011 bill aimed at the prevention of school violence. Its contents were later incorporated into the more wide-ranging Child and Adolescent Code, enacted in 2014, near the end of her term. Sempértegui promoted similar legislation in her capacity as a representative to the Latin American Parliament, where she also elaborated a proposal for the creation of a regionwide network for the protection of child laborers.

Absent their political benefactor, Paredes's allies in parliament were not nominated for reelection come the 2014 elections. Such was the case for Sempértegui, who did not compete for a second term. A similar instance occurred with many of the lawmakers elected under the influence of Manfred Reyes Villa – CN's other political leader-turned-fugitive.

=== Commission assignments ===
- Planning, Economic Policy, and Finance Commission
  - Planning and Public Investment Committee (2010–2011, 2013–2014)
- Human Rights Commission
  - Gender Rights Committee (Secretary: 2014–2015)
- Government, Defense, and Armed Forces Commission
  - Fight Against Drug Trafficking Committee (2012–2013)
- International Relations and Migrant Protection Commission
  - International Economic Relations Committee (Secretary: 2011–2012)

== Electoral history ==
Electoral history of Ana María Sempértegui
Year	Office	Party	Alliance	Votes			Result	Ref.
Year	Office	Party	Alliance	Total	%	P.	Result	Ref.
2009	Deputy	Plan Progress for Bolivia	National Convergence	119,248	8.71%	2nd	Won	(Note: Presented on an electoral list. The data shown represents the share of the vote the entire party/alliance received in that constituency.)
Source: Plurinational Electoral Organ | Electoral Atlas

Chamber of Deputies of Bolivia
Preceded by Jorge Solari	Member of the Chamber of Deputies from La Paz; 2010–2015	Succeeded by Wilson Santamaría
