= Eduardo del Castillo =

Bolivian politician (born 1988)

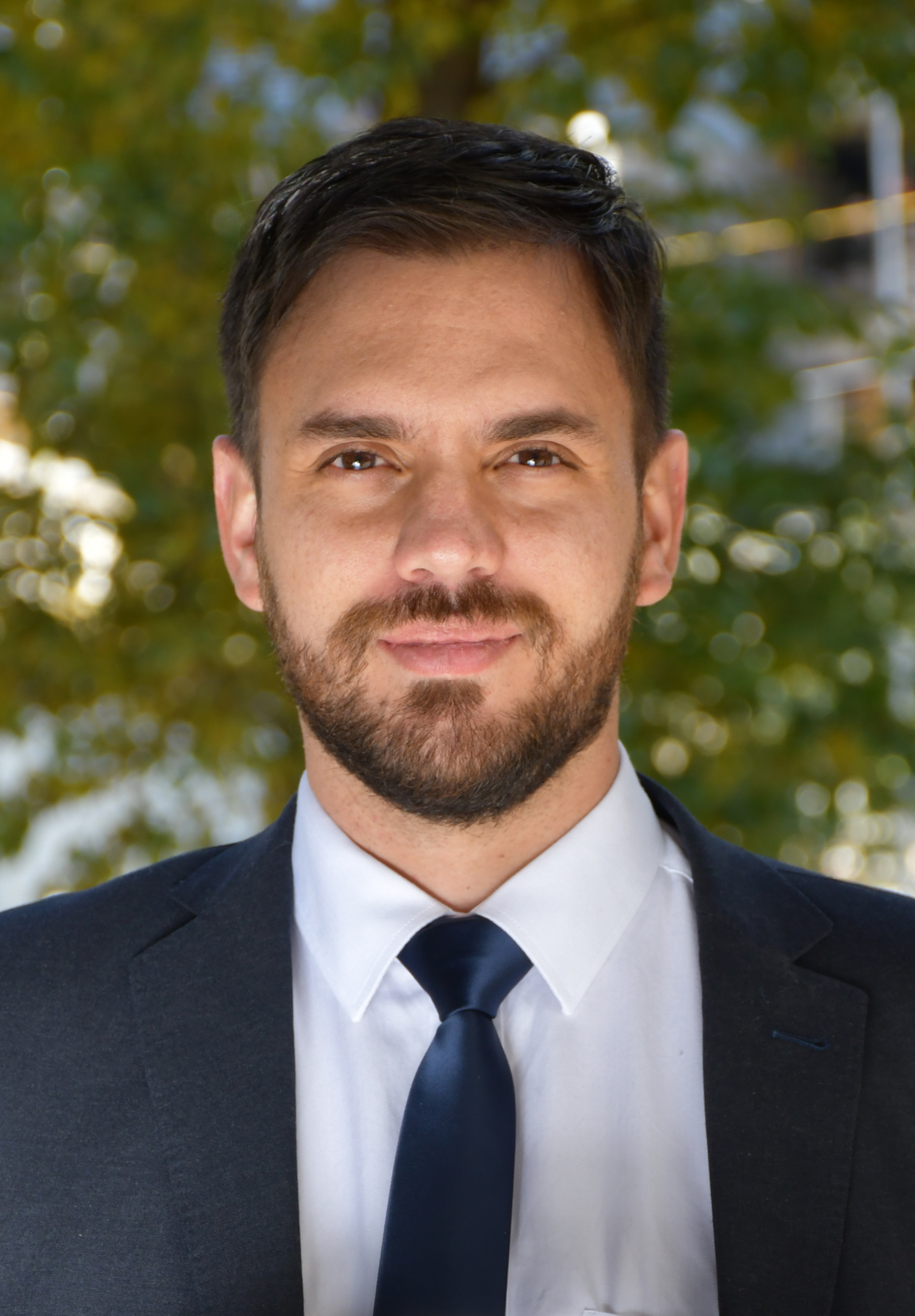
- Castillo in 2020

Minister of Government
- In office 9 November 2020 – 20 May 2025
- President: Luis Arce
- Preceded by: Arturo Murillo
- Succeeded by: Roberto Ríos

Personal details
- Born: Carlos del Castillo del Carpio; 27 December 1988 (age 36) Santa Cruz de la Sierra, Bolivia
- Political party: Movement for Socialism (2020-2025)
- Education: Gabriel René Moreno Autonomous University

Carlos Eduardo del Castillo del Carpio (born 27 December 1988) is a Bolivian lawyer and politician who served as the Minister of Government of Bolivia from 9 November 2020 to 20 May 2025.

== Biography ==
Eduardo Del Castillo was born on 27 December 1988 in Santa Cruz de la Sierra. He studied law at the Gabriel René Moreno Autonomous University graduating as a lawyer. He completed postgraduate studies, obtaining a master's degree in Tax and Financial Law from the Higher School of Law and has a diploma in Higher Education and Interculturality from the Higher University of San Andrés. He also holds a diploma in Economic, Social, and Cultural Rights from the University of Buenos Aires in Argentina.

A member of the Movement for Socialism (MAS) since 2005, del Castillo began his work in the Bolivian Chamber of Senators as a technical secretary and advisor to the Commission for Plural Justice. He later served as senior officer of the Senate. He worked in the Ministry of Government as a legal advisor in the Migration Directorate in Santa Cruz, then as a National Taxes lawyer in the Public Ministry in Santa Cruz.

== Minister of Government (2020-2025) ==
On 9 November 2020, President Luis Arce appointed Eduardo Del Castillo to the position of Minister of Government. As Minister, del Castillo assured that "the regrettable figures" of COVID-19 seen in the previous administration would not be repeated.

In 2025, del Castillo resigned from the government in order to run for president in the 2025 Bolivian General Election. He was succeeded by former deputy security minister Roberto Ríos. Del Castillo failed to advance to a runoff in the election, placing sixth.

Political offices
Preceded by Arturo Murillo	Minister of Government; 2020-2025	Succeeded by vacant
