= Interdisciplinary Group of Independent Experts for Bolivia =

The Interdisciplinary Group of Independent Experts for Bolivia (Grupo Interdisciplinario de Expertos Independientes—Bolivia, GIEI) is a committee of jurists and human rights experts created by the Inter-American Commission on Human Rights (IACHR) to carry out a parallel investigation of human rights violations during the 2019 Bolivian political crisis, covering the period from 1 September 2019 to 31 December 2019. The group was established following discussions between the IACHR and the interim Bolivian government led by Jeanine Áñez in December 2019, and an agreement between the two in January 2020. Its four members were appointed on 23 January 2020. The Group was supported by a five-member technical team and the Argentine Forensic Anthropology Team (Equipo Argentino de Antropología Forense). The Group began its work in Bolivia on 23 November 2020 and issued its final report on 23 July 2021.

The GIEI was granted 6 months to conduct their investigation. However, as a result of the COVID-19 pandemic as well as the large amounts of material they needed from state institutions, they were granted an additional two months. The investigation included meeting with State authorities, civil society organizations, victims' associations, victims and victim's relatives, journalists, international diplomatic delegations, visiting the sites of violence, and a review of governmental documents on events, forensic and ballistic reports, and audio-visual documentation. The team analyzed over 120,000 pages of judicial and investigative files provided by governmental authorities and over 1,000 audiovisual files provided by the press, the IACHR and civil society. Following eight months of investigation, the GIEI released a comprehensive 482 page report detailing their findings as well as their recommendations.

== Expert Members ==
The members of the group itself were:

- Juan Méndez, President of the IACHR and UN Special Rapporteur on Torture and Other Cruel, Inhuman and Degrading Treatment or Punishment.
- Julian Burger, visiting professor at the Human Rights Centre at the University of Essex (United Kingdom), an indigenous rights expert.
- Marlon A. Weichert, a Federal Prosecutor and Deputy Federal Attorney for Citizen Rights in Brazil.
- Patricia Tappatá Valdez, Director of the International Center for the Promotion of Human Rights - UNESCO in Buenos Aires.
- Magdalena Correa, Expert in constitutional law, academic.

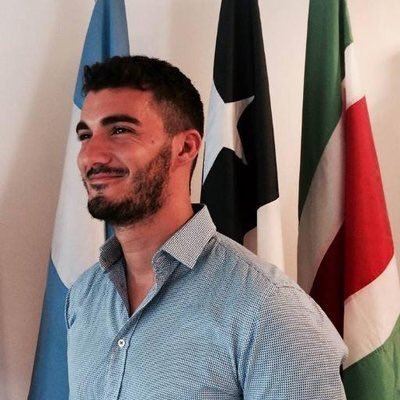

The Group was coordinated by Jaime Vidal (Spanish Chilean nationality), Executive Secretary of GIEI Bolivia.

Additionally, the group had a technical team in the field composed of Magdalena Garcés, Chilean national, Nancy Bautista and David Uribe Mexican nationals and Giovanni Mendoza Bolivian national.
