= 2019 shortages in Bolivia =

Shortages caused by the 2019 Bolivian protests

During late October and much of November 2019, much of Bolivia experienced shortages caused by the 2019 Bolivian protests. Unrest prevented supplies reaching the capital district of Bolivia that includes the major cities of La Paz and El Alto Other cities were also affected., but the cities of Santa Cruz and Cochabamba were also affected. By mid-November, the interim government planned an "air bridge" to transport goods and bypass the road blockades and ditches dug by protesters.

== Food ==
Food was rationed in the country, with roadblocks by pro-Morales protesters disrupting supply chains causing people to have to queue for hours at shops. However, these shops were also short on basics. An eyewitness reported that in one market of the capital, 5,000 people were waiting to buy one chicken. He referred to the shortages as "food terrorism". Independent stall owners were closing because of lack of goods, with shops rapidly increasing the prices of their stock. On roads into the city of Santa Cruz, supply trucks that were unable to access had been left with produce rotting.

== Gas ==
Major fuel shortages affected cities in Bolivia. Reuters reported that "roads have grown quiet", with people not driving to preserve gasoline. In poorer areas, fuel is so limited that people have resorted to using firewood for cooking. The state-run Senkata gas plant in El Alto, which serves this city and the capital of La Paz, was blockaded by protestors demanding the return of Evo Morales to power. On Tuesday 19 November, the military accessed the plant again with armored vehicles. While the military says the operation was peaceful, the human rights ombudsman for Bolivia says that three people were killed. After the plant was re-taken, people began waiting outside with gas canisters; fuel trucks could again leave the plant, doing so in protected police and military convoys.
