= Sergio Choque =

Bolivian politician (born 1968)

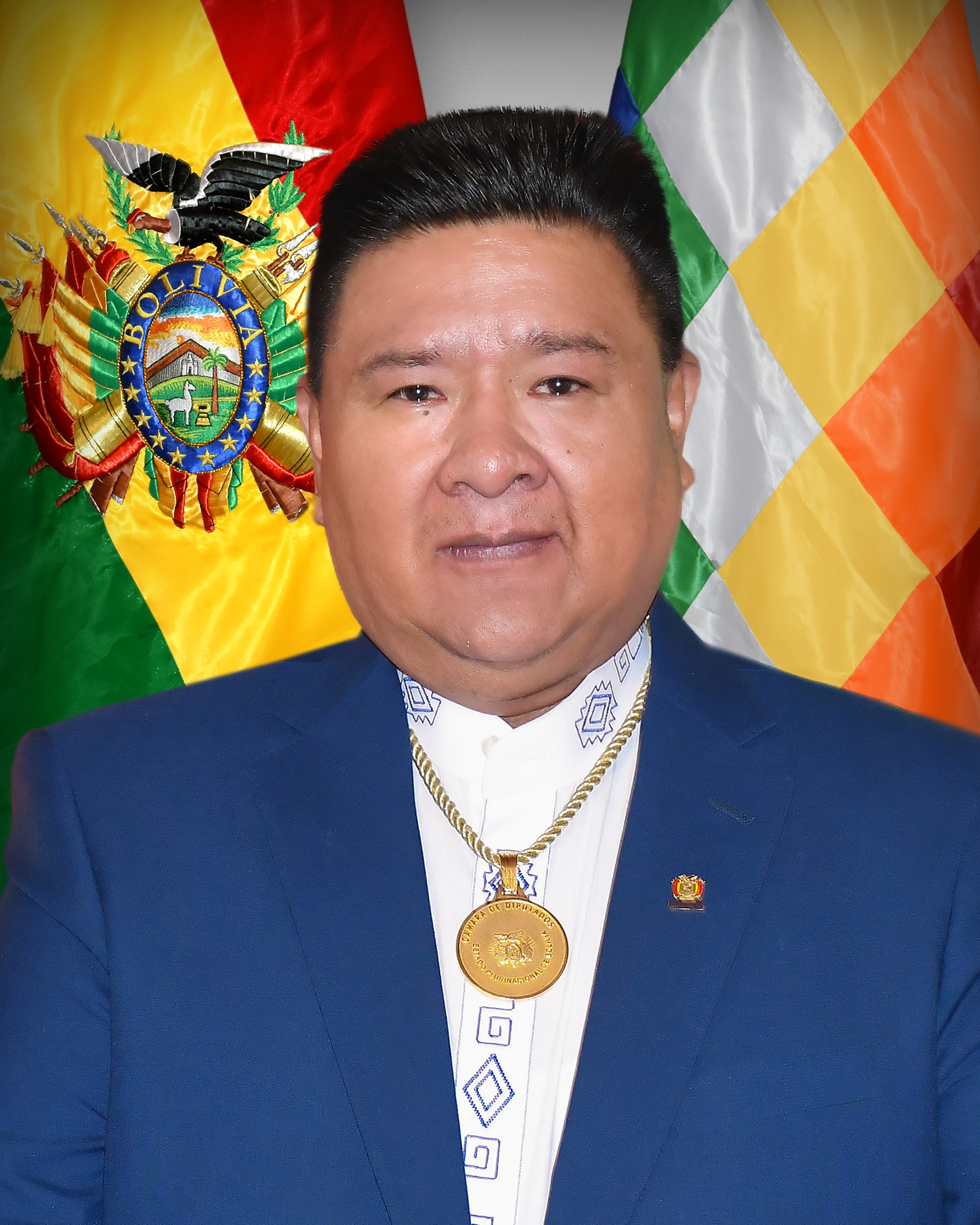
- Choque in 2019

President of the Chamber of Deputies of Bolivia
- Preceded by: Víctor Borda
- Succeeded by: Freddy Mamani Laura

Personal details
- Born: September 28, 1968; El Alto, Bolivia

Sergio Choque is a politician from Bolivia who served as President of the Chamber of Deputies of Bolivia.

== Personal life ==
He was born on September 28, 1968, in El Alto. In 2004, he was incarcerated for six years for making false stamped paper.
