= Senkata =

- Barrio
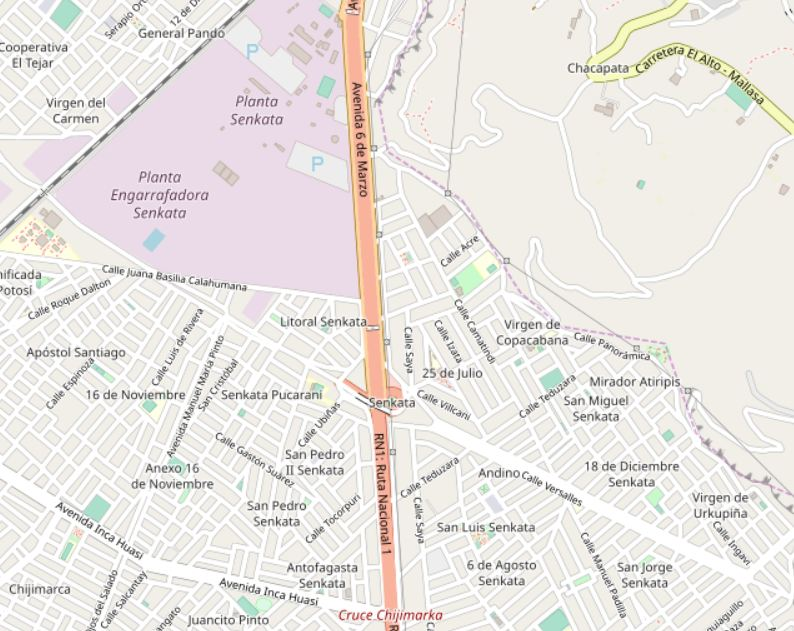
- Map of Senkata in El Alto, Bolivia
- Country: Bolivia
- Municipality: El Alto
- Time zone: UTC-4 (BOT)

Senkata is an area in the southern part of the city of El Alto, Bolivia, and is part of the city's 8th District. El Alto is the second most populated city in Bolivia according to the 2012 census. Senkata has drawn international attention for multiple social protests.

== Location ==
Senkata is located in the lateral areas of Avenida 6 de marzo in the city of El Alto, Bolivia. This avenue is part of the Ruta nacional 1 - the Bolivian highway network that connects the La Paz Department (Bolivia) with the departments of Oruro, Chuquisaca, Potosí and Tarija.

== Characteristics ==
The District of Senkata is in the vicinity of the La Paz - Oruro highway. It houses the Senkata Plant, where Yacimientos Petrolíferos de Bolivia has its liquid gas and gasoline installations providing these to the neighbouring city of La Paz.

== History ==
Much like the other districts in El Alto, the population that lived there initially were immigrants of other regions in Bolivia, mainly miners that lived through the relocation in Bolivia during the 80s, which caused the loss of jobs for mine workers and triggered their migration to other cities.

In 2003, during the Bolivian gas conflict, multiple people were shot by police in a series of clashes in El Alto In 2019 during the post electoral protests in Bolivia, multiple people were injured after police conflicts.

In both events, an executive decree authorizing police and military intervention was followed by civilian deaths. In 2003, the intervention was supported by executive Decree 27209, and in 2019 the intervention was supported by Decree 4078, which exonerated the Armed Forces of Bolivia of criminal culpability.

== Neighborhoods and residential areas ==
The Senkata area includes the following neighborhoods:

- Florida Senkata
- San Luis de Senkata
- San Jorge Senkata
- 5 de diciembre
- Senkata 79 Anex
- San Miguel Senkata
- 27 de mayo Senkata
- Los Pinos Senkata
- Florida Senkata
- 6 de agosto Senkata
- Senkata 79
- Senkata Pucarani

== Landmarks ==
Among the main landmarks of the area there are:

- Church San Francisco de Asís
- Square 25 de julio
- Ex-tranca of Senkata
- Parrish of Santa Clara
- Senkata Plant YPFB

== See also ==
- El Alto
- La Paz
