= Cabinet of Jeanine Áñez =

Bolivian presidential administration and ministerial cabinet from 2019 to 2020

Áñez cabinet
- 220th–221st Cabinet of the Plurinational State of Bolivia
- 2019–2020
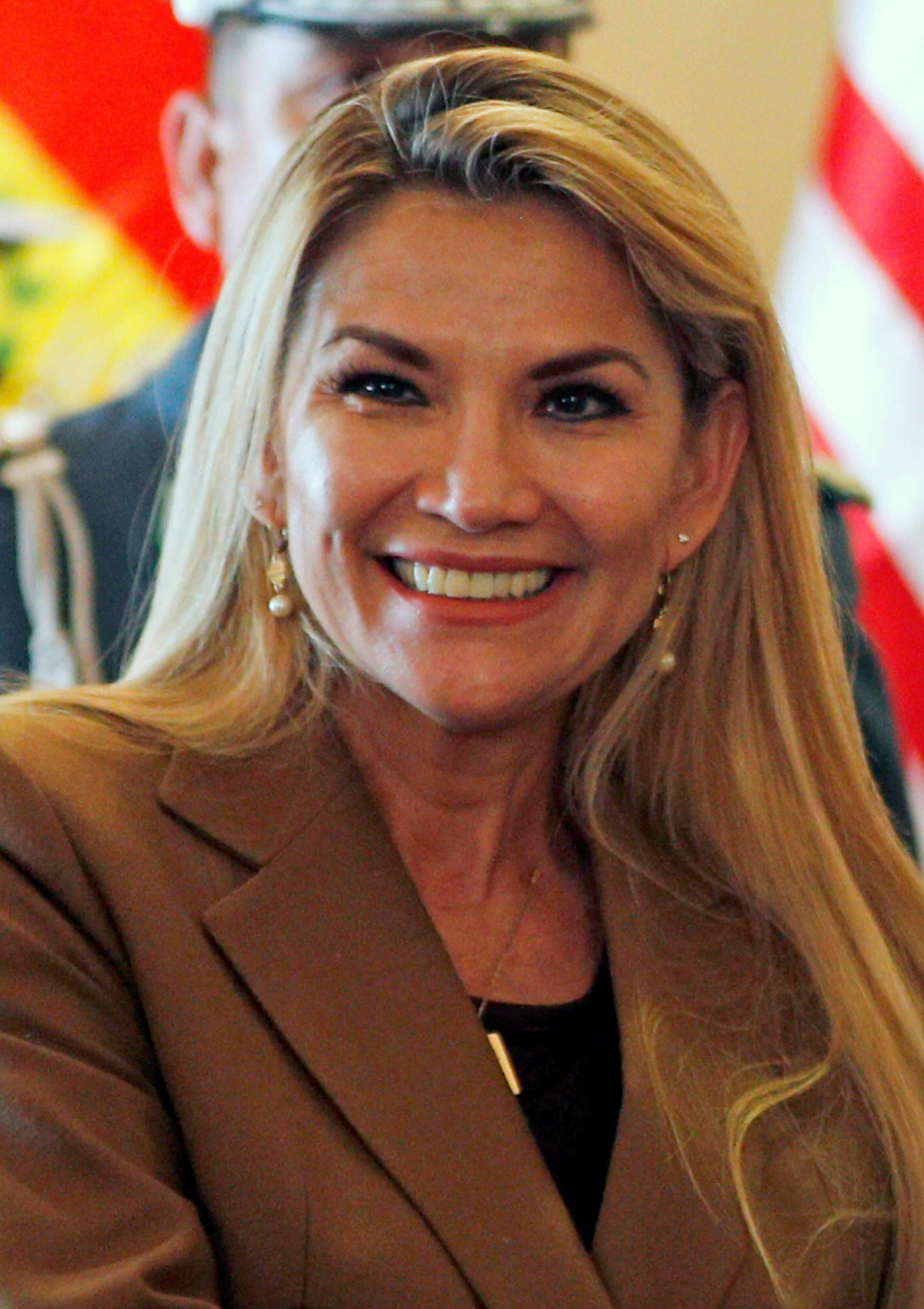
- Date formed: 13 November 2019
- Date dissolved: 6 November 2020 (Note: Jeanine Áñez's term ended on 8 November 2019. But all members of the cabinet presented their resignations on 6 November, effectively dissolving it on that date.)

People and organisations
- President: Jeanine Áñez
- Vice president: Vacant
- No. of ministers: 17
- Total no. of members: 37 (incl. former members)
- Member party: Democrat Social Movement
- Status in legislature: Minority government

History
- Legislature term: 2015–2020
- Predecessor: Cabinet of Evo Morales
- Successor: Cabinet of Luis Arce

The cabinet of Jeanine Áñez constituted the 220th and 221st cabinets of the Plurinational State of Bolivia. It was initially formed on 13 November 2019, a day after Jeanine Áñez was sworn-in as the 66th president of Bolivia following the 2019 political crisis, in which the ruling Movement for Socialism government resigned. A second cabinet was formed on 28 January 2020 with all but three ministers being ratified in their positions.

The cabinet suffered numerous structural changes and was noted for its high turnover rate. In just under a year, thirty-seven individuals occupied twenty ministerial portfolios with three ministries being abolished entirely by the end of Áñez's mandate. Political analyst Marcelo Silva attributed the administration's instability to the fact that "Jeanine Áñez didn't imagine, not even in the best of scenarios, becoming president. There is a hint of improvisation, because there was no methodical plan for organizing a government". Despite assurances that all ministers had been inaugurated in a non-partisan capacity, multiple had political and personal links with Rubén Costas, the leader of Áñez's Democrat Social Movement, and Luis Fernando Camacho, a civic leader prominent in the protests which preceded Áñez's assumption to office.

== Cabinet ministers ==
Portfolio	Minister	Party	Prof.	Took office	Left office	Term	Ref.
President	Jeanine Áñez	MDS	Law.	12 November 2019	8 November 2020	362	
Vice President	Office vacant throughout presidency					362	
Minister of Foreign Affairs	Karen Longaric	Ind.	Law.	13 November 2019	6 November 2020	359	
Minister of the Presidency	Jerjes Justiniano	Ind.	Law.	13 November 2019	3 December 2019	20	
Minister of the Presidency	Yerko Núñez	MDS	Agr.	3 December 2019	6 November 2020	339	
Minister of Government	Arturo Murillo	MDS	Bus.	13 November 2019	19 October 2020	341	
Minister of Government	Wilson Santamaría	MDS	Law.	19 October 2020	20 October 2020	1	
Minister of Government	Arturo Murillo	MDS	Bus.	20 October 2020	6 November 2020	17	
Minister of Defense	Luis Fernando López	Mil.	Mil.	13 November 2019	9 March 2020	117	
Minister of Defense	Gastón Ramiro Peñaloza	Mil.	Mil.	9 March 2020	10 March 2020	1	
Minister of Defense	Luis Fernando López	Mil.	Mil.	10 March 2020	6 November 2020	241	
Minister of Development Planning	Office vacant 13 November 2019 – 15 November 2019					2	
Minister of Development Planning	Carlos Melchor Díaz	Ind.	Eco.	15 November 2019	4 August 2020	2,519	
Minister of Development Planning	Office vacant 4 August 2020 – 5 August 2020					1	
Minister of Development Planning	Branko Marinković	Ind.	Bus.	5 August 2020	28 September 2020	54	
Minister of Development Planning	Gonzalo Quiroga	Ind.	Eco.	28 September 2020	6 November 2020	39	
Minister of Communication	Roxana Lizárraga	Ind.	Jrnl.	13 November 2019	26 January 2020	74	
Minister of Communication	Office vacant 26 January 2020 – 28 January 2020					2	
Minister of Communication	Isabel Fernández Suárez	Ind.	Jrnl.	28 January 2020	4 June 2020	128	
Minister of Communication	Office merged with the Ministry of the Presidency						
Minister of Economy and Public Finance	José Luis Parada	MDS	Eco.	13 November 2019	7 July 2020	237	
Minister of Economy and Public Finance	Óscar Ortiz Antelo	MDS	B.A.	7 July 2020	28 September 2020	83	
Minister of Economy and Public Finance	Branko Marinković	Ind.	Bus.	28 September 2020	6 November 2020	39	
Minister of Hydrocarbons	Office vacant 13 November 2019 – 14 November 2019					1	
Minister of Hydrocarbons	Víctor Hugo Zamora	PDC	F.E.	14 November 2019	6 November 2020	358	
Minister of Productive Development and the Plural Economy	Office vacant 13 November 2019 – 14 November 2019					1	
Minister of Productive Development and the Plural Economy	Wilfredo Rojo Parada	Ind.	Bus.	14 November 2019	7 May 2020	175	
Minister of Productive Development and the Plural Economy	Office vacant 7 May 2020 – 8 May 2020					1	
Minister of Productive Development and the Plural Economy	Óscar Ortiz Antelo	MDS	B.A.	8 May 2020	7 July 2020	60	
Minister of Productive Development and the Plural Economy	Abel Martínez	MDS	Eco.	7 July 2020	28 September 2020	83	
Minister of Productive Development and the Plural Economy	Office vacant 28 September 2020 – 29 September 2020					1	
Minister of Productive Development and the Plural Economy	Adhemar Guzmán	Ind.	Eco.	29 September 2020	6 November 2020	38	
Minister of Public Works, Services, and Housing	Yerko Núñez	MDS	Agr.	13 November 2019	3 December 2019	20	
Minister of Public Works, Services, and Housing	Iván Arias	Ind.	Jrnl.	3 December 2019	6 November 2020	339	
Minister of Mining and Metallurgy	Office vacant 13 November 2019 – 18 November 2019					5	
Minister of Mining and Metallurgy	Carlos Huallpa	Ind.	Uni.	18 November 2019	8 May 2020	172	
Minister of Mining and Metallurgy	Fernando Vásquez Arnez	Ind.	Eng.	8 May 2020	30 May 2020	22	
Minister of Mining and Metallurgy	Office vacant 30 May 2020 – 12 June 2020					13	
Minister of Mining and Metallurgy	Jorge Oropeza Terán	UCS	Law.	12 June 2020	6 November 2020	147	
Minister of Justice and Institutional Transparency	Álvaro Coimbra	MDS	Law.	13 November 2019	6 November 2020	359	
Minister of Labor, Employment, and Social Security	Office vacant 13 November 2019 – 27 November 2019					14	
Minister of Labor, Employment, and Social Security	Óscar Bruno Mercado	MDS	Law.	27 November 2019	3 December 2019	306	
Minister of Labor, Employment, and Social Security	Óscar Bruno Mercado	MDS	Law.	3 December 2019	28 September 2020	306	
Minister of Labor, Employment, and Social Security	Álvaro Tejerina	Ind.	C.E.	28 September 2020	6 November 2020	39	
Minister of Health	Office vacant 13 November 2019 – 14 November 2019					1	
Minister of Health	Aníbal Cruz	Ind.	Dr.	14 November 2019	7 April 2020	145	
Minister of Health	Office vacant 7 April 2020 – 8 April 2020					1	
Minister of Health	Marcelo Navajas	Ind.	Surg.	8 April 2020	20 May 2020	42	
Minister of Health	Eidy Roca	Ind.	Surg.	20 May 2020	28 May 2020	170	
Minister of Health	Eidy Roca	Ind.	Surg.	28 May 2020	6 November 2020	170	
Minister of Environment and Water	María Elva Pinckert	MDS	Law.	13 November 2019	6 November 2020	359	
Minister of Education	Office vacant 13 November 2019 – 18 November 2019					5	
Minister of Education	Virginia Patty	Ind.	Law.	18 November 2019	28 January 2020	71	
Minister of Education	Víctor Hugo Cárdenas	UCS	Prof.	28 January 2020	4 June 2020	265	
Minister of Education, Sports, and Cultures	Víctor Hugo Cárdenas	UCS	Prof.	4 June 2020	19 October 2020	265	
Minister of Education, Sports, and Cultures	Reynaldo Paredes	Ind.	Law.	19 October 2020	20 October 2020	1	
Minister of Education, Sports, and Cultures	Víctor Hugo Cárdenas	UCS	Prof.	20 October 2020	6 November 2020	17	
Minister of Rural Development and Land	Mauricio Ordoñez	MAS	Agr.	13 November 2019	28 January 2020	76	
Minister of Rural Development and Land	Eliane Capobianco	MDS	Law.	28 January 2020	6 November 2020	283	
Minister of Energies	Rodrigo Guzmán	MDS	Eco.	13 November 2019	6 November 2020	359	
Minister of Cultures and Tourism	Office vacant 13 November 2019 – 14 November 2019					1	
Minister of Cultures and Tourism	Martha Yujra	MDS	Uni.	14 November 2019	4 June 2020	203	
Minister of Cultures and Tourism	Office merged with the Ministry of Education						
Minister of Sports	Office vacant 13 November 2019 – 14 November 2019					1	
Minister of Sports	Milton Navarro	ADN	C.E.	14 November 2019	4 June 2020	203	
Minister of Sports	Office merged with the Ministry of Education						

== Structural changes ==
Portfolio	Part of	Transferred to	Date	Decree
Communications	Ministry of Communications	Ministry of the Presidency	4 June 2020	Supreme Decree No. 4257
Cultures	Ministry of Cultures and Tourism	Ministry of Education, Sports, and Cultures	4 June 2020	Supreme Decree No. 4257
Sports	Ministry of Sports	Ministry of Education, Sports, and Cultures	4 June 2020	Supreme Decree No. 4257
