= Isabel Fernández (disambiguation) =

Isabel Fernández (born 1980) is a Bolivian journalist and politician.

Isabel Fernández may also refer to:

- Isabel Fernández de Soto (born 1950), Colombian tennis player
- Isabel Fernández (judoka) (born 1972), Spanish judoka
- Isabel Fernandes (born 1985), Angolan team handball player
- Isabel Fernández (mathematician) (born 1979), Spanish mathematician
