= Yerko Núñez =

Bolivian politician (born 1973)

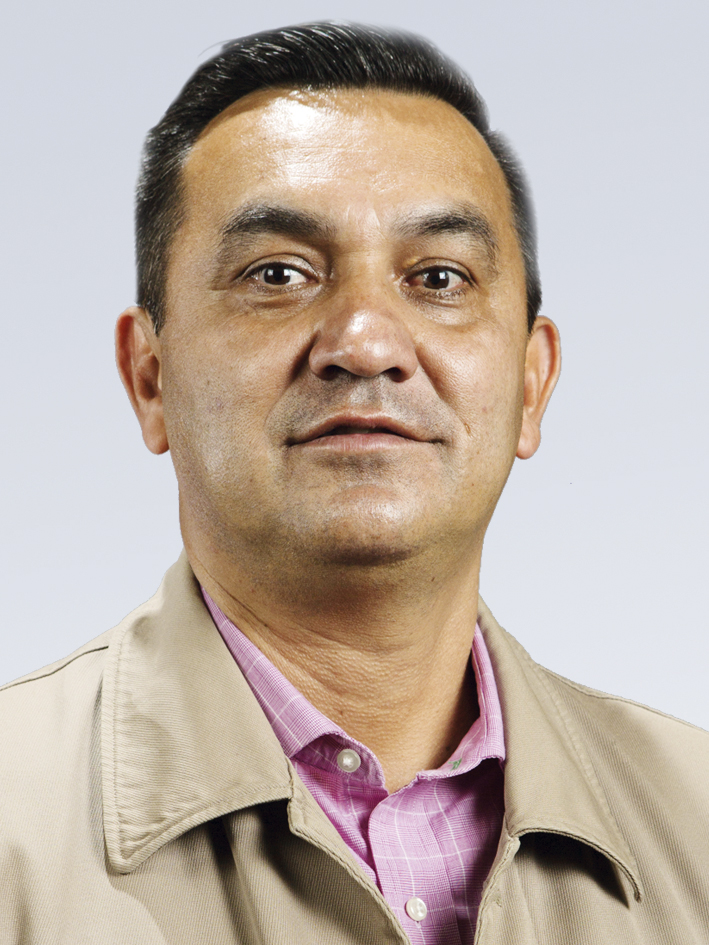
- Official portrait, 2018

Minister of the Presidency
- In office 3 December 2019 – 6 November 2020
- President: Jeanine Áñez
- Preceded by: Jerjes Justiniano
- Succeeded by: María Nela Prada

Minister of Public Works, Services, and Housing
- In office 13 November 2019 – 3 December 2019
- President: Jeanine Áñez
- Preceded by: Oscar Coca
- Succeeded by: Iván Arias

Senator for Beni
- In office 18 January 2015 – 13 November 2019
- Substitute: Bilgay Méndez
- Preceded by: Carlos Alberto Sonnenschein
- Succeeded by: Bilgay Méndez

Personal details
- Born: Yerko Martin Núñez Negrette; 17 April 1973 (age 52) Rurrenabaque, Beni, Bolivia
- Party: Social Democratic Movement (2014–2020)
- Other political affiliations: Revolutionary Nationalist Movement (before 2010); Beni First (2010–2014)
- Occupation: Agronomist; politician

Yerko Martín Núñez Negrette (born 17 April 1973) is a Bolivian agronomist and politician who served as minister of the presidency from 2019 to 2020. A member of the Social Democratic Movement, he previously served as minister of public works from November to December 2019. Throughout his ministerial tenure, Núñez was noted as a key person of influence in the transitional government and a "right-hand" to President Jeanine Áñez, a fellow Beni native. Prior to his appointment, he served as senator from Beni from 2015 to 2019 on behalf of the Democratic Unity coalition. As a member of Beni First, Núñez served as mayor of Rurrenabaque from 2010 to 2014; he previously held the position for two terms from 2000 to 2003 and 2005 to 2010 as part of the Revolutionary Nationalist Movement. Núñez's mayoral tenure saw strides made for Rurrenabaque's ecotourism industry, which generated increased economic growth for the city.

== Early life and career ==
Yerko Núñez was born on 17 April 1973 in Rurrenabaque, Beni, to Antonio Núñez Gamarra and Carmen Negrette Arce. Núñez's family was one of the most influential clans in Rurrenabaque; both his father and grandfather previously served as mayor of the city, owing to their alignment with the Revolutionary Nationalist Movement (MNR). Núñez himself continued this legacy: from age 25, he participated in various political training courses abroad in locales such as Colombia, Peru, Germany, and the United States.

In 1999, Núñez contested his first election, seeking a seat on the Rurrenabaque Municipal Council at the top of the MNR's electoral list. (Note: Per Article 3 Section VI of the 1967 Constitution with amendments from 1995, individuals who appear at the top of a party's electoral list of councillors are also that party's candidate for mayor. This practice was abandoned following the passage of the 2009 Constitution, with municipal elections since 2010 holding separate contests for mayor and municipal councillors.) He was narrowly successful, with the MNR nearly being displaced from the mayorship by the opposing Revolutionary Left Movement (MIR). Upon assuming office in February 2000, Núñez, aged 26, became the youngest mayor in the country at the time. His administration was characterized by generally transparent economic management and the implementation of policies promoting public participation in the planning and execution of citywide projects. After three years in office, Núñez resigned as mayor to serve as national director of the Secretariat of Popular Participation, a government body responsible for aiding and regulating municipal development. A year later, in 2004, he worked as a public official in the National Congress, serving as the technical secretary of the Senate's Popular Participation Commission.

Leading up to the 2004 municipal elections, Núñez returned to Rurrenabaque to seek a second mayoral term. While the previous year's significant social conflicts largely discredited the MNR as a national force, the party maintained a modicum of support in the eastern lowlands. Given this, instead of forming his own front like many other political leaders, Núñez maintained his allegiance to the MNR, again emerging victorious on the party's electoral list. By 2010, however, Núñez chose not to seek a third term with the MNR, instead joining Beni First, a newly established front combining former members of the MIR, MNR, and Nationalist Democratic Action (ADN) with support from regional trade unions. Núñez handily won the election, attaining 3,476 votes; conversely, the MNR won just thirty.

Núñez's mayoral terms accompanied the takeoff of tourism in the area. Efforts to promote travel to Rurrenabaque began in 2000, a year in which the city received six thousand tourists. By 2007, the city recorded a yearly average of approximately fifty thousand, split relatively evenly between foreign tourists and Bolivian nationals. The significant influx of visitors greatly aided Rurrenabaque's economic prospects, bringing the city between US$7 million and US$8 million per year and generating new sources of income for its inhabitants. The decision to promote tourism was first outlined in the city's municipal development plan—developed in coordination with the population itself—which also specified agriculture and forestry as key components of economic development. In a 2012 interview with La Palabra del Beni, Núñez identified tourism as "the engine of the regional economy", with Rurrenabaque being "the epicenter of the tourist region".

Other projects of Núñez's mayoral tenure included the development of a municipal housing program, which funded the construction of more than 150 homes in the city. Basic sanitation was also fully implemented during his term, with the additional establishment of ten health posts and the city's first municipal hospital. Núñez's achievements in promoting economic development, ecological tourism, and environmental regulation were lauded by various national and international institutions. His administration was recognized by the national government as number one in transparency and efficiency in Beni and fourth in the country as a whole. During his final two terms, Núñez also served as president of the Board of Directors of the Association of Municipalities of Beni and as secretary of the Autonomous Council of Beni.

== Chamber of Senators ==
=== Election ===
Nearing the end of this third term, Núñez's political track record led him to be profiled as a viable candidate for higher office. In late 2012, Beni First presented Núñez and Carmelo Lenz as possible contenders to face Jessica Jordan for the departmental governorship in a special gubernatorial election. Núñez faced ten other pre-candidates from various allied parties—collectively known as the Broad Front—in a regional poll aimed at consolidating a single opposition candidacy for the election. Ultimately, Lenz was found to have the most support among the populace and received the alliance's nomination. Notwithstanding, Núñez was later invited by former governor Ernesto Suárez to be the Social Democratic Movement (MDS)'s candidate for senator as part of the Democratic Unity (UD) coalition. Throughout the campaign, Núñez expressed his confidence that UD would win the election, taking all nineteen of Beni's municipalities with it. Ultimately, his prediction proved partially correct; UD lost the election, winning only one of the nine departments: Beni. The alliance took just over fifty percent of the vote in that department, electing two senators: Núñez and Jeanine Áñez. The former mayor became the first inhabitant of Rurrenabaque to attain a seat in the Senate.

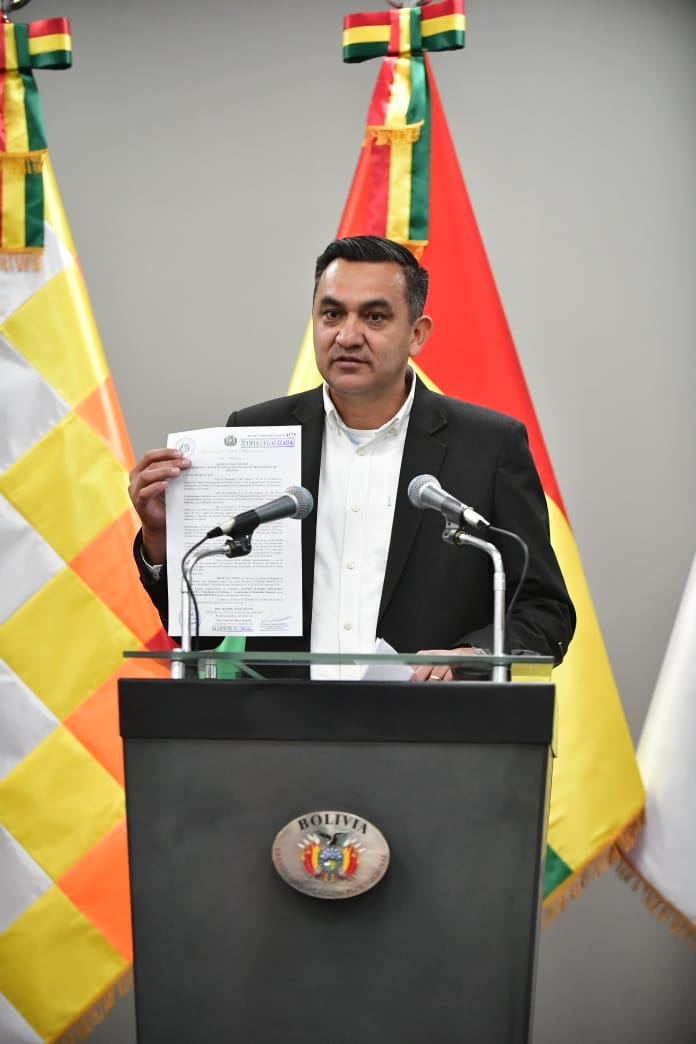
Núñez holds up a document containing newly implemented legislation.

=== Tenure ===
Not long after entering the legislature, the Democratic Unity caucus quickly fractured, owing in large part to political disputes between its two leaders, Rubén Costas of the MDS and Samuel Doria Medina of the National Unity Front (UN). For Núñez, who aligned himself politically with the MDS, the UD alliance "finished its cycle in 2015", the year in which each member party presented its own candidates for the subnational elections. Throughout his term, Núñez collaborated closely with fellow Beni senator Jeanine Áñez, with whom he had been a close confidant for over a decade. Nearing the end of his Senate tenure, during the 2019 election cycle, Núñez supported the MDS's electoral campaign. That year, amid widespread protests sparked by allegations of electoral fraud, Núñez delivered a report accusing the president of the Supreme Electoral Tribunal, María Eugenia Choque, of ordering the suspension of the transmission of preliminary results in an attempt to rig the count and give the victory to President Evo Morales. Ultimately, continued social unrest culminated in Morales's resignation, followed by that of Choque, who was subsequently arrested.

== Minister of the Presidency ==
On 12 November 2019, after two days of uncertainty, Morales was succeeded in the presidency by Jeanine Áñez. The following day, the new head of state inaugurated her Cabinet, appointing Núñez to helm the Ministry of Public Works, Services, and Housing. During his short time in office, Núñez set about initiating audits of ongoing works, investigating acts of corruption, and executing pending projects. Ultimately, however, he did not remain in the ministry long, with Áñez reassigning him to dispatch the role of minister of the presidency just under a month later. Upon assuming office, Núñez pledged to promote efficient coordination between the various ministries and combat "nests of corruption" within the government. In his new position, Núñez quickly came to be noted as one of the more influential figures within the transitional government and a "right-hand" to Áñez, whom herself stated upon his inauguration that she held "full trust" in him. Per a report by Opinión, even before assuming office, Núñez had been tasked with suggesting individuals to helm the ministries of hydrocarbons and development planning. As such, Áñez's appointment of Víctor Hugo Zamora and Carlos Melchor Díaz, respectively, occurred at his suggestion. According to multiple former Áñez ministers, Núñez, alongside the ministers of government and defense, Arturo Murillo and Luis Fernando López, functioned as a "mini-cabinet" that formed the president's inner circle.

During the initial stages of the transition, Núñez reiterated Áñez's earlier pledge that she would not present herself as a presidential candidate. Expanding on this, the minister stressed that the transitional government would also refrain from endorsing any contending campaigns, maintaining neutrality throughout the electoral process. Nonetheless, in the early weeks of 2020, Núñez and several other ministers expressed their view that the president should seek election for a full term. When Áñez did finally officialize her candidacy as part of the Juntos alliance, Núñez gave his "personal" endorsement. Even so, the minister was later made to explain why government-funded programs had begun using the word juntos in their marketing. Núñez's claim that such occurrences were "mere coincidence" drew the ire of competing campaigns, with one opposing vice-presidential candidate accusing the minister of "underestimat[ing] the intelligence of Bolivians". The government later switched out juntos in favor of unidos in all public works advertising.

Nearing the election date, Áñez opted to withdraw her candidacy to prevent the return to power of Morales' party, the Movement for Socialism (MAS-IPSP). Following the announcement, Núñez called on other fronts with little chance of winning to also remove themselves from contention. Following the victory of Luis Arce in the presidential election, Núñez announced the establishment of a government commission to facilitate the transmission of power between the incoming and outgoing administrations. The minister lauded the meetings held in this process as "historic" due to their transparent and orderly nature. On 6 November 2020, two days before the formal inauguration of the new government, Núñez resigned from office, retiring to his residence in Rurrenabaque.

== Flight from the country ==
Not long after leaving office, on 12 March 2021, the Prosecutor's Office issued an arrest warrant against Núñez, Áñez, and multiple other transition and military officials on charges of conspiracy, sedition, and terrorism for their role in the alleged "coup d'état" perpetrated in November 2019. At around 2:00 p.m., police raided the home of Núñez's mother, a move denounced as "abusive" by his nephew, Gary Tudela, who alleged that no search warrant was presented. Attempts to locate Núñez led government officials to Trinidad, where his 21-year-old son, Antonio, was arrested on suspicion that he knew his father's whereabouts. After eight hours in police custody, the younger Núñez was released from detention and was subsequently granted refuge by the Beni Civic Committee. A migration alert to prevent Núñez from leaving the country by legal means was activated on 19 March. By that point, the former minister had already declared himself in hiding, with a birthday message directed to his daughter indicating that he had likely left the country. Per a report by La Razón, Núñez was able to elude law enforcement thanks to Marco Cossío, the then departmental prosecutor for La Paz, who allegedly tipped him off about the impending charges. Armed with this information, he fled on a small plane into Brazil.

== Electoral history ==
Electoral history of Yerko Núñez
Year	Office	Party	Alliance	Votes			Result	Ref.
Year	Office	Party	Alliance	Total	%	P.	Result	Ref.
1999	Mayor	Revolutionary Nationalist Movement	None	758	28.91%	1st	Won	(Note: Presented on an electoral list. The data shown represents the share of the vote the entire party/alliance received in that constituency.)
2004	Mayor	Revolutionary Nationalist Movement	None	1,279	36.82%	1st	Won	
2010	Mayor	Beni First	None	3,476	51.73%	1st	Won	
2014	Senator	Social Democratic Movement	Democratic Unity	91,855	51.44%	1st	Won	
Source: Plurinational Electoral Organ | Electoral Atlas

Senate of Bolivia
Preceded by Carlos Alberto; Sonnenschein	Senator for Beni; 2015–2019; Served alongside: Jeanine Áñez, Erwin Rivero, María Argene Simoni	Succeeded by Bilgay Méndez
Political offices
Preceded by Oscar Coca	Minister of Public Works, Services, and Housing; 2019	Succeeded by Iván Arias
Preceded by Jerjes Justiniano	Minister of the Presidency; 2019–2020	Succeeded by María Nela Prada
