= Fernando Vázquez (disambiguation) =

Fernando Vázquez (born 1954) is a Spanish footballer.

Fernando Vázquez may also refer to:

- Fernando Vázquez de Arce (?–1520), Bishop of Islas Canarias
- Fernando Vázquez de Menchaca (1512–1569), Spanish jurist
- Fernando Vásquez (born 1962), Bolivian mining minister
- Fernando Vázquez (race walker) (born 1971), Spanish racewalker
- Fernando Vázquez (para-athlete) (born 1999), Argentine para-athlete
- Fer Vázquez (Fernando Vázquez, born 1994), Uruguayan singer
- Fernando Vázquez (footballer, born 1999), Mexican footballer
- Fernando Vázquez (para-athlete) (born 1999), Argentine para-athlete
