= Carlos Alberto Sonnenschein =

Bolivian politician (born 1961)

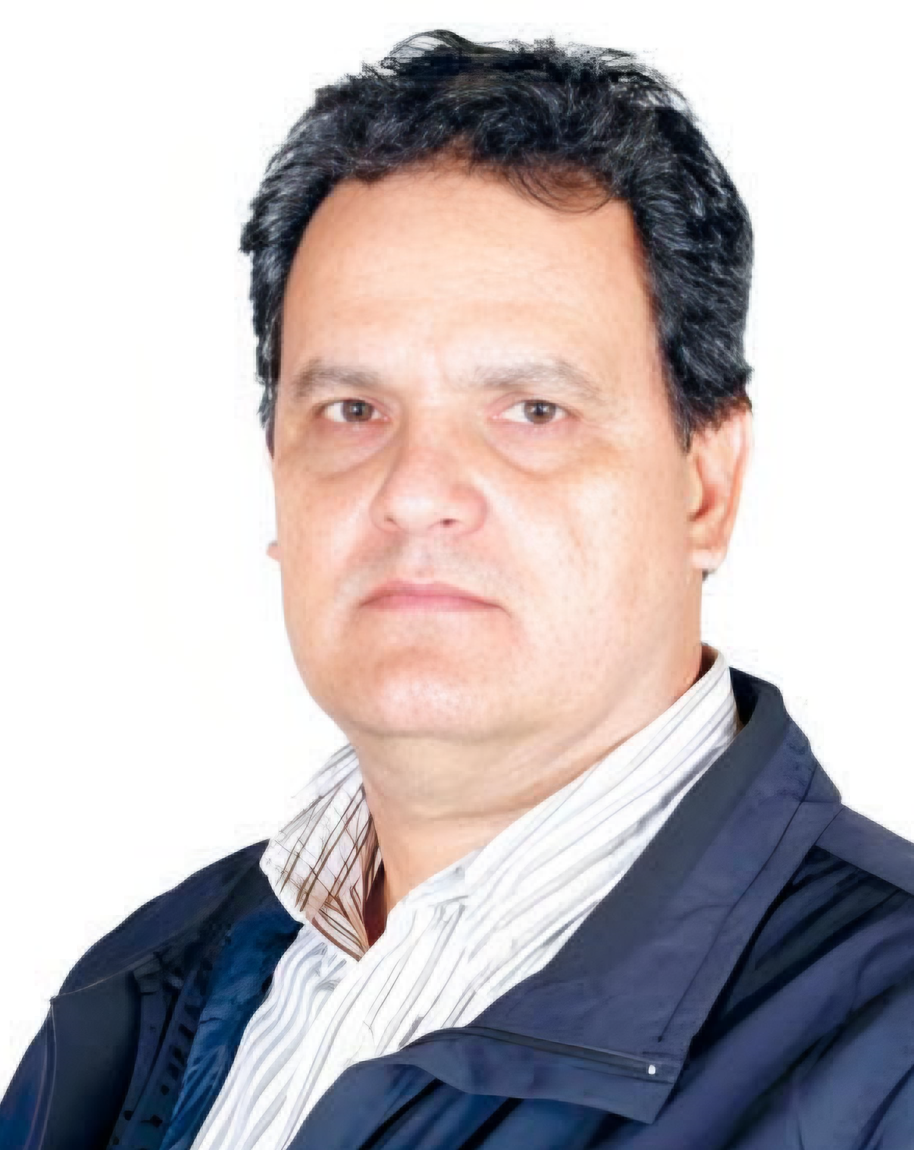
- Official portrait, 2012

Senator for Beni
- In office 19 January 2010 – 18 January 2015
- Substitute: Magda Arze
- Preceded by: Wálter Guiteras
- Succeeded by: Yerko Núñez

Member of the Chamber of Deputies from Beni circumscription 64
- In office 2 August 2002 – 19 January 2010
- Substitute: Guido Destre (2002–2006); Franklin Valdivia (2006–2010)
- Preceded by: Sandro Giordano
- Succeeded by: Einar Gozalves
- Constituency: Riberalta

Personal details
- Born: Carlos Alberto Sonnenschein Antelo; 28 January 1961 (age 65) Riberalta, Beni, Bolivia
- Party: Revolutionary Nationalist Movement
- Relatives: Sandro Giordano (brother-in-law)
- Occupation: Businessman; politician; rancher

Carlos Alberto Sonnenschein Antelo (born 28 January 1961) is a Bolivian businessman, politician, and rancher who served as senator for Beni from 2010 to 2015. A member of the Revolutionary Nationalist Movement, he previously served as a member of the Chamber of Deputies from Beni, representing circumscription 64 from 2002 to 2010.

Born into a wealthy upper-class family from Riberalta, Sonnenschein's early career was characteristic of many of Beni's economic elite. He held executive positions in the most relevant corporate entities handling the department's export and cattle industries and played prominent roles in the civic sector, including chairing Riberalta's civic committee as well as its major utility cooperatives and sports associations.

Having served in leadership within the Revolutionary Nationalist Movement's Riberalta affiliate, Sonnenschein won a seat representing the municipality in the Chamber of Deputies in 2002. Reelected to a second term in 2005, he survived the party's dramatic fall from grace, a decline that, by 2009, led him to join National Convergence for his final electoral bid for Senate. Despite serving a collective twelve years between his three parliamentary terms, Sonnenschein was conspicuously absent most of the time, preferring to remain in his home region than deal with the goings on at the capital.

== Early life and career ==
Carlos Alberto Sonnenschein was born on 28 January 1961 in Riberalta to a regionally influential family of wealthy Amazonian landowners. Descended from European emigrants that first settled northern Beni during the early 20th-century rubber boom, Sonnenschein's family comprises part of the Riberalta's economic elite; in the absence of the state apparatus, white-mestizo clans like Sonnenschein's exercised immense, semi-autonomous societal influence, projecting their power through the accumulation of capital and control over major local industries – primarily the cattle ranching business. (Note: Aside from Carlos Alberto, the Sonnenschein family's presence in northern Beni's business sector includes his brother, Herbert, president of the Riberalta Ranchers' Association; nephew, Carlos, vice president of the Beni Ranchers' Federation; and relative, Elizabeth, general manager of the Northeast Chamber of Exporters, among others.)

Owing to his affluent upbringing, Sonnenschein quickly rose to high-level positions within northern Beni's leading private and public entities. A graduate of Riberalta's prestigious Pedro Kramer School, he chaired the Northeast Chamber of Exporters from 1996 to 1998 and was vice president of its parent organization, the National Chamber of Exporters, from 1997 to 1999. In the civic sector, he directed the local electricity and telecommunications cooperatives, headed Riberalta's football and basketball associations, and was president of the Riberalta Civic Committee.

== Chamber of Deputies ==
=== Election ===
Among Beni's elites, participation in politics came as a natural evolution of their regional economic influence. After the democratic transition, many wealthy families aligned themselves with either Nationalist Democratic Action or the Revolutionary Nationalist Movement (MNR) – the parties most receptive to their demands and needs – in effect creating a two-party system in which each front asserted its influence by proxy of competing clans; political conflicts translated to intrafamily ones, party membership drew more from familial tradition than ideological conviction, and the department's electoral bipolarity, in turn, prevented the emergence of significant counterweights to either side's socioeconomic hegemony.

By the turn of the century, Riberalta had established itself as an electoral bastion of the MNR, with the region's elites having monopolized northern Beni's most important executive and legislative positions. As chair of the local civic community, Sonnenschein enjoyed important political and lobbying connections and by 2001, he had been named deputy leader of the MNR's Riberalta affiliate. When in 2002 Sonnenschein's brother-in-law, Sandro Giordano, vacated his seat in the Chamber of Deputies to run for Senate, Sonnenschein was given the opportunity to contest the 64th district, in which he easily prevailed.

Reelected in 2005, Sonnenschein's political career survived the dramatic decline of the MNR – hit hard by the stigma of its role in the 2003 gas conflict, the party saw its worst electoral showing in its organizational history. In part, Sonnenschein's success owed to the continued degree of support afforded to the MNR in one of its traditional regions of support: the Amazon, in particularly Beni, where it won its only senator and two single-member constituency victories – including Sonnenschein. Even then, Sonnenschein's personal popularity cannot be discounted as a factor, especially since, on the presidential ballot, Michiaki Nagatani took second place in the same district.

=== Tenure ===
As with many parliamentarians who hail from the northeastern departments, Sonnenschein's legislative tenure showed more interest in fortifying his local presence, popularity, and influence back home than in dealing with the various congressional conflicts and crises taking place in La Paz at any given time. Though the resulting regional recognition certainly benefitted him electorally, it came at the cost of actual political participation. By 2009, Sonnenschein had come to be noted for the high quantity of absences – often unexcused – he had accumulated throughout his two terms and seven years in office. Year on year, he consistently topped the list of the most absentee legislators, accruing Bs 40,950 in sanctions between January and August 2007 alone. In all, according to Movement for Socialism deputy Martín Mollo, Sonnenschein missed ninety-eight percent of all sessions held during the 2006–2010 congressional term, leaving his legislative record largely a mystery and making him a true unknown among journalists and staffers in parliament.

=== Commission assignments ===
- Finance Commission (Vice President: 2008–2010)
- Economic Development Commission (Vice President: 2007–2008)
- Human Development Commission
  - Housing Committee (2003–2004)
- Labor and Employment Law Commission (Vice President: 2006–2007)
- Defense and Armed Forces Commission (2004–2006)
- Sustainable Development Commission (Vice President: 2002–2003)

== Chamber of Senators ==
=== Election ===
Weakened and in continuous political decline, the MNR entered the 2009 elections on its last legs; its presidential candidate, Germán Antelo, stayed in the race for just over a month, only to abruptly step down to support National Convergence (PPB-CN), the multi-front mega-coalition backing Manfred Reyes Villa. As a result, for the first time in decades, the MNR did not participate in a national election. Amid the conspicuous absence of key party figures and political families from the electoral arena, Sonnenschein was among the few MNR legislators to successfully secure a candidacy on one of the still-competing parliamentary lists – nominated by CN to contest a seat in the Senate, a position he won.

=== Tenure ===
In contrast to the rest of CN's parliamentary caucus – eternally engulfed in constant infighting over the scant positions of power afforded to the minority bloc – Sonnenschein preferred to play a more laid-back role throughout his senatorial tenure, as he had done in the two previous legislatures. In a scenario where his nine opposition colleagues frequently clashed with one another over which commission they ought to chair, Sonnenschein opted to spend the few sessions he actually attended working from one of the upper chamber's many committees – positions "nobody fights for." When, by process of elimination, he was finally due to assume a seat on the Senate's powerful directorate in 2014, Sonnenschein ceded his right to colleague Jeanine Áñez. When mentioning Sonnenschein in its recounting of CN's fraught parliamentary history, outlet La Razón put plainly: "Sonnenschein, who?".

=== Commission assignments ===
- Planning, Economic Policy, and Finance Commission
  - Financial, Monetary, Tax, and Insurance Policy Committee (Secretary: 2010–2014)
- Plural Economy, Production, Industry, and Industrialization Commission
  - Plural Economy, Productive Development, Public Works, and Infrastructure Committee (Secretary: 2014–2015)

== Electoral history ==
Electoral history of Carlos Alberto Sonnenschein
Year	Office	Party	Alliance	Votes			Result	Ref.
Year	Office	Party	Alliance	Total	%	P.	Result	Ref.
2002	Deputy	Revolutionary Nationalist Movement	MNR-MBL	8,770	45.71%	1st	Won	
2005	Deputy	Revolutionary Nationalist Movement		6,857	43.66%	1st	Won	
2009	Senator	Revolutionary Nationalist Movement	National Convergence	85,631	53.15%	1st	Won	(Note: Presented on an electoral list. The data shown represents the share of the vote the entire party/alliance received in that constituency.)
Source: Plurinational Electoral Organ | Electoral Atlas

Chamber of Deputies of Bolivia
Preceded by Sandro Giordano	Member of the Chamber of Deputies from Beni circumscription 64; 2002–2010	Succeeded by Einar Gozalves
Senate of Bolivia
Preceded by Wálter Guiteras	Senator for Beni; 2010–2015; Served alongside: Jeanine Áñez, Freddy Bersatti, Zonia Guardia	Succeeded by Yerko Núñez
