= Patricia Paputsakis =

Bolivian politician (born 1986)

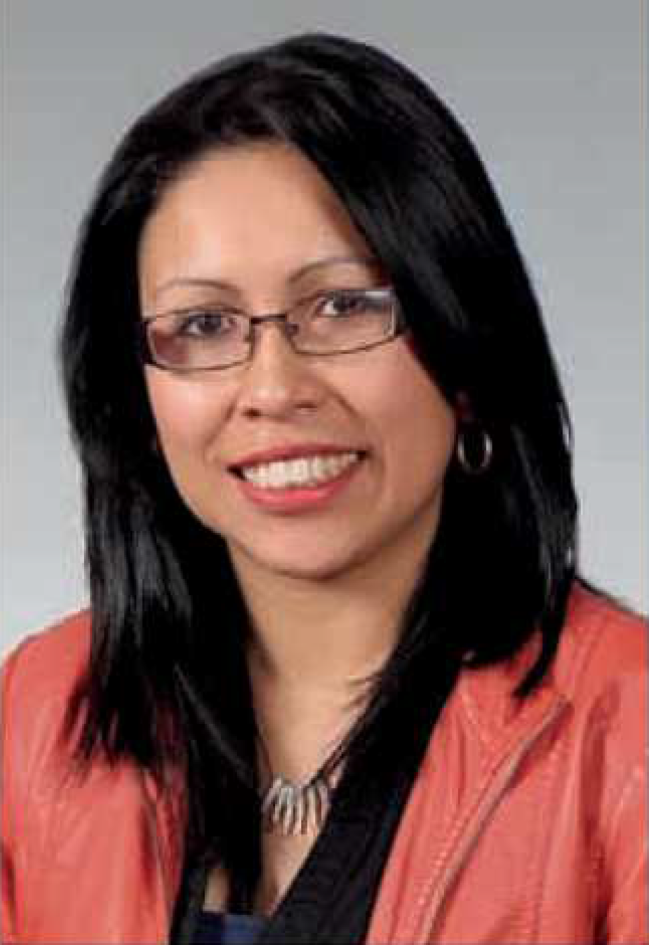
- Official portrait, 2014

Secretary of Women and Family of Tarija
- In office 3 June 2015 – 23 July 2019
- Mayor: Rodrigo Paz
- Preceded by: Office established
- Succeeded by: Marysabel Romero

Member of the Chamber of Deputies from Tarija circumscription 45
- In office 14 August 2014 – 18 January 2015
- Substitute: Vacant
- Preceded by: Víctor Hugo Zamora
- Succeeded by: Circumscription abolished
- Constituency: Cercado

Member of the Chamber of Deputies from Tarija circumscription 45
- Substitute
- In office 25 January 2010 – 14 August 2014
- Deputy: Víctor Hugo Zamora
- Preceded by: Mirtha Humerez
- Succeeded by: Circumscription abolished
- Constituency: Cercado

Personal details
- Born: Diana Patricia Paputsakis Burgos; 23 April 1986 (age 40) Tarija, Bolivia
- Party: Independent (2020–present)
- Other political affiliations: United to Renew (2009–2019); First the People (2019–2020)
- Education: Juan Misael Saracho University
- Occupation: Lawyer; politician

Diana Patricia Paputsakis Burgos (born 23 April 1986) is a Bolivian lawyer, politician, and former student leader who served as secretary of women and family of Tarija from 2015 to 2019. Prior to her service in the municipal government, Paputsakis served as a substitute member Chamber of Deputies from Tarija, representing circumscription 45 under Víctor Hugo Zamora from 2010 to 2014 on behalf of the National Convergence alliance. In the 2019 general election, Paputsakis was elected to represent Tarija's circumscription 40 on behalf of Civic Community, but never took office, owing to the annulment of the electoral results and the coalition's decision not to re-nominate her in 2020. Paputsakis later contested the 2021 Tarija mayoral election, finishing sixth in the polls.

== Early life and career ==
Patricia Paputsakis was born on 23 April 1986 in Tarija to Pedro Paputsakis Flores and Agueda Burgos Añasgo. Through her father, she is of Greek descent; Constantino Paputsakis—her grandfather—immigrated to Buenos Aires from the Kingdom of Greece in 1910, later settling in Tarija. Paputsakis was raised in a politically active family; her father, Pedro, represented the Revolutionary Left Front (FRI) in the Chamber of Deputies from 1979 to 1980 and 1982 to 1985 and in the Senate as a substitute senator from 1989 to 1993. Agueda Burgos also counted a political career, representing the FRI on the Tarija Municipal Council for three terms between 1987 and 1993.

Paputsakis studied law and political science at Juan Misael Saracho University, graduating with a diploma in pedagogical theory and practice and another in gender violence and women's human rights. Additionally, she holds a master's in administration of justice with a specialty in child human rights and restorative criminal justice. During her time at university, she became active in student leadership, serving as a member and later executive of the Law School Student Center from 2006 to 2007.

== Chamber of Deputies ==
=== Election ===
As with many former student unionists, upon leaving university, Paputsakis sought to enter the political field, joining United to Renew (UNIR), the party of Tarija Mayor Oscar Montes. In 2009, as part of UNIR's alliance with National Convergence (CN), she was elected to represent Tarija's circumscription 45 in the Chamber of Deputies, serving as a substitute under Víctor Hugo Zamora. Aged 23, Paputsakis was one of the youngest legislators in the Plurinational Legislative Assembly.

=== Tenure ===
Throughout her term, Paputsakis's work focused on projects in favor of Tarija's university system and legislation expanding administrative decentralization and departmental autonomy. Together with Zamora, she participated in drafting a total of forty-three bills, of which four passed into law. During this time, she also served as vice president of the Union of Women Parliamentarians. In the leadup to the 2014 general election, Zamora resigned to run for higher office, allowing Paputsakis to assume office as the titular deputy for circumscription 45 for the remainder of her term.

=== Commission assignments ===
- Planning, Economic Policy, and Finance Commission
  - Budget, Tax Policy, and Comptroller's Office Committee (2012–2013)
- Rural Native Indigenous Peoples and Nations, Cultures, and Interculturality Commission
  - Coca Leaf Committee (2013–2014)
- Amazon Region, Land, Territory, Water, Natural Resources, and Environment Commission
  - Environment, Climate Change, Protected Areas, and Forest Resources Committee (2014–2015)

== Later political career ==
=== 2015 municipal election ===
In late 2014, nearing the conclusion of her term, Paputsakis was nominated by UNIR to run for a seat on the Tarija Municipal Council. Throughout the campaign, Paputsakis's political prospects remained continually in doubt, given the legal ambiguity of her candidacy. In December, the Supreme Electoral Tribunal (TSE) had issued a controversial ruling barring all legislators who held office in the outgoing legislature from running in the 2015 elections. The court argued that their permanent residence in the last two years had been La Paz and not other regions, contravening the Constitution's residency requirements for candidates. The TSE's determination was opposed by ruling party and opposition parliamentarians alike, including Paputsakis, who stood to be disqualified despite only having spent a week a month in La Paz during her tenure.

In January, the TSE opted to exclude substitute legislators from its ruling, reasoning that, on average, they resided more in their constituencies than their full-time counterparts. Though this temporarily allowed Paputsakis to continue in the running, her candidacy remained mired by legal battles. Finally, on 19 March, just ten days before the election, the Departmental Electoral Tribunal of Tarija disqualified Paputsakis, stating that since she became a titular deputy following Zamora's resignation, she was subject to the TSE's ruling. The electoral authority's decision came in response to a "semi-anonymous suit" filed by Daniela Aspiazu, which El País interpreted as a "maneuver" born from UNIR's leader, Montes, who quickly moved to replace Paputsakis's name on the ballot with that of Ruth Ponce, his own wife. Ponce's sudden designation was understood to be a sign of simmering mistrust between Montes and his elected mayoral successor, Rodrigo Paz, with Paputsakis's deposition being the "first hostile act" in their eventual schism.

=== Tarija Mayor's Office ===
Shortly after assuming office, Paz established the Secretariat of Women and Family, appointing Paputsakis to head it on 3 June 2015. Paputsakis's administration focused its efforts on combating violence against women and children across the Cercado Province. As outlined by Paputsakis, her office structured its work on two pillars: prevention and attention to cases. In prevention, the Secretariat collaborated with educational institutions and school psychologists to improve public understanding of subjects related to domestic violence, child sexual abuse, teenage pregnancy, and human trafficking, with the aim of reducing such problems. In 2017, Paputsakis launched a family development program seeking to encourage assertive communication, dialogue, and respect between family members. As part of this, the Secretariat deployed Municipal Prevention Brigades in over seventy educational institutions, offering workshops to primary and secondary students to train them in recognizing signs of sexual abuse and violence by or between parents.

Together with other social organizations, Paputsakis developed a municipal plan that united various institutions in combating excessive consumption of alcohol and illicit substances, especially by minors. The plan established an observatory on addictions and the supply of alcoholic beverages, expanded the amount of educational material on the matter, and launched a public campaign of prevention throughout the province. The project made Tarija the first municipality to implement an alcohol and drug prevention plan, for which the municipal government was given the National Sobriety Award.

Shortly thereafter, Paputsakis released a plan to reduce teenage pregnancies through three lines of action: comprehensive sexual education, promotion of sexual and reproductive rights, and the expansion of sexual and reproductive health. By 2019, the project had reduced the rate of pregnancy among adolescents in Cercado to below eighteen percent, a significant development given that surrounding provinces often registered prevalence rates above fifty percent. The program's successes led the Secretariat to present its plan to the United Nations Population Fund.

=== 2019 legislative election ===
When relations between Montes and Paz ultimately broke down, Paputsakis sided with the latter, joining his breakaway political party, First the People (PG). As secretary, Paputsakis's public profile led her to be considered as a possible mayoral successor to Paz, should he not seek reelection. Following Paz's decision to lend PG's support to the 2019 presidential campaign of his father, former president Jaime Paz Zamora, Paputsakis reluctantly added her endorsement. When Paz Zamora withdrew from the race, Paputsakis accepted the invitation of Civic Community (CC) to be its candidate for deputy in Tarija's circumscription 40. The decision led Paputsakis to resign her position in the Mayor's Office, though she said there was no estrangement between herself and the mayor. Ultimately, Paz also opted to support CC, with Paputsakis set to be PG's designated member of the legislature. Though Paputsakis won her election, subsequent social unrest over broader allegations of electoral fraud and the ensuing political crisis ultimately resulted in the annulment of the national election results, precluding Paputsakis from assuming office. She was not re-nominated in the snap 2020 elections, with CC selecting trade unionist Edwin Rosas instead.

=== 2021 mayoral campaign ===
Paz's decision to forgo reelection in favor of presenting himself as a candidate for senator put PG in the difficult situation of finding a last-minute mayoral nominee, with Paputsakis discussed as a possible candidate. Ultimately, the party failed to nominate anyone from among its own ranks, instead supporting the candidacy of Alan Echart, a member of Todos, Governor Adrián Oliva's party. Given this, Paputsakis took the politically risky decision to launch her own solo campaign. Her candidacy was facilitated by Nationalist Democratic Action (ADN) and Solidarity Civic Unity (UCS), forming the electoral alliance Sustainable Base for Tarija (BASTA). Paputsakis's campaign sought to present itself as a "new way of doing politics", nominating a slate of young newcomer political leaders on its list of municipal councillors. "The participation of new, young people is necessary, as well as the incorporation of women with new proposals", she stated. Her public policy plan proposed improving basic services, new environmental regulations, and economic reactivation through an alliance between the public and private sectors. However, by the election date, Paputsakis's campaign had failed to garner substantial support; she attained just 2,032 votes, coming in sixth place in a seven-candidate race.

== Electoral history ==
Year	Office	Party	Alliance	Votes			Result	Ref.
Year	Office	Party	Alliance	Total	%	P.	Result	Ref.
2009	Sub. Deputy	United to Renew	National Convergence	25,378	50.97%	1st	Won	
2015	Councillor	United to Renew	None	Disqualified			Lost	
2019	Deputy	First the People	Civic Community	24,042	31.6%	1st	Annulled	
2021	Mayor	Independent	Sustainable Base	2,032	1.45%	6th	Lost	
Source: Plurinational Electoral Organ | Electoral Atlas

Chamber of Deputies of Bolivia
Preceded by Mirtha Humerez	Substitute Member of the Chamber of Deputies from Tarija circumscription 45; 2010–2014	Circumscription abolished
Preceded by Víctor Hugo Zamora	Member of the Chamber of Deputies from Tarija circumscription 45; 2014–2015	Circumscription abolished
Political offices
Office established	Secretary of Women and Family of Tarija; 2015–2019	Succeeded by Marysabel Romero
