= Popular Alliance (Bolivia) =

Popular Alliance Alianza Popular
- Abbreviation: AP
- Leader: Andrónico Rodríguez
- President: Félix Patzi
- Founded: 17 April 2025
- Legalized: 17 April 2025
- Split from: Movimiento al Socialismo
- Ideology: Indigenism; Left-wing populism Plurinationalism; Socialism of the 21st century
- Political position: Centre-left to left-wing
- Colors: Sky blue Dark green
- Slogan: Andrónico, la fuerza de Bolivia ('Andronico, the force of Bolivia')
- Senate: 0 / 36
- Deputies: 8 / 130

Website
- www.alianzapopular.org.bo

Popular Alliance (AP) is a Bolivian political alliance led by Senator Andrónico Rodríguez. The alliance is made up of the political parties Third System Movement (MTS), Revolutionary Socialist Party (PSR), and Autonomist Movement for Work and Stability (MATE).

The alliance was founded to compete in the 2025 Bolivian general election. Its candidates were selected in April 2025.

== History ==
The leader of the Third System Movement, Félix Patzi, confirmed that on Thursday, April 17, he managed to register the alliance called Alianza Popular (AP) with the Supreme Electoral Tribunal (TSE), which is made up of the party he leads and two citizen groups. Patzi invited Andrónico Rodríguez to be a candidate for the Popular Alliance; Andronico finally accepted and was accompanied by Mariana Prado, former Minister of Development Planning under Evo Morales.

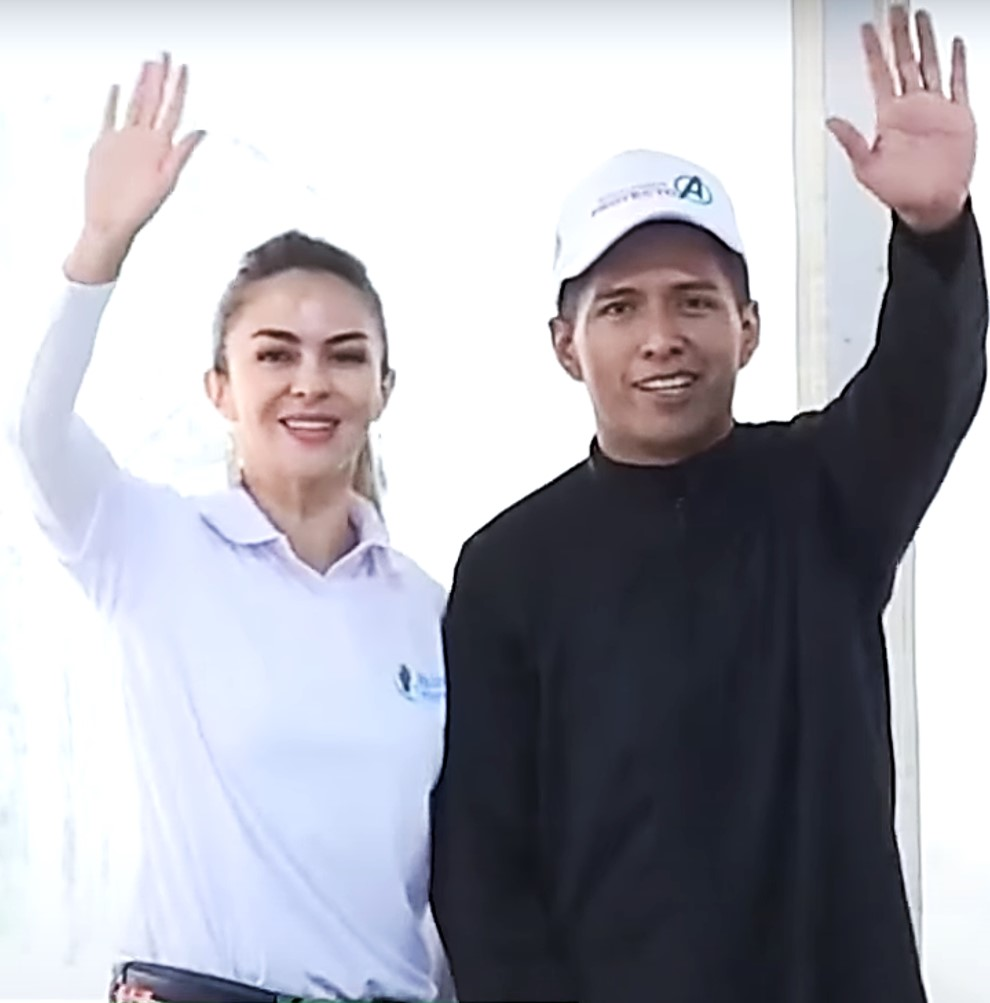
Andrónico and Mariana registering their candidacy together with the TSE.

On 3 May 2025, former MAS-IPSP member Andrónico Rodríguez officially announced his candidacy for the Presidency of Bolivia in the city of Oruro. Later, on 19 May 2025, in the city of La Paz, Rodríguez officially presented to the entire public of the country the former minister Mariana Prado Noya, who would be the woman who would accompany him as a candidate for the vice presidency, noting that he decided to choose her because of her experience and financial knowledge acquired when she held the high position of Minister of State of Bolivia between 2017 and 2019 during the third government of President Evo Morales Ayma. In his presentation, Andrónico Rodríguez also mentioned that he was not "a candidate of arcismo, nor of the right, nor of the empire" but a candidate for a "better Bolivia".

== Election results ==
=== Presidential elections ===
Election	Presidential nominee	Votes	%	Votes	%	Result
Election	Presidential nominee	First round		Second round		Result
2025	Andrónico Rodríguez	456,002	8.51%			Lost ✗

=== Chamber of Deputies and Senate elections ===
Election	Party leader	Votes	%	Chamber seats	+/-	Position	Senate seats	+/-	Position	Status
2025	Andrónico Rodríguez	439,388	8.39%	10 / 130	New	▲4th	0 / 36	New	▲5th	Opposition

== See also ==
- List of political parties in Bolivia
