= Víctor Hugo Zamora =

Bolivian politician (born 1970)

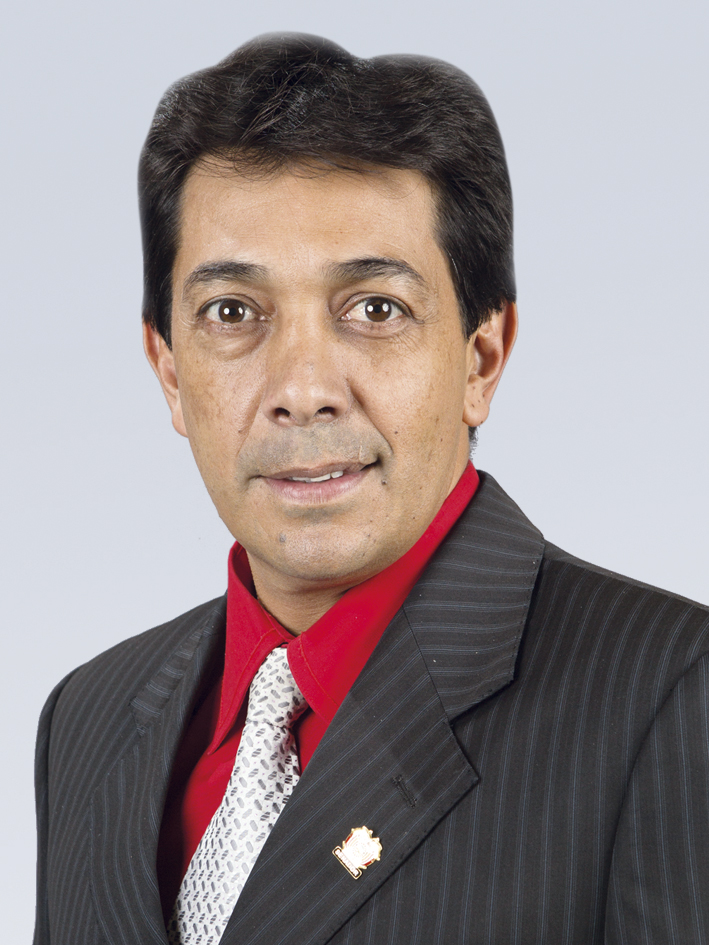
- Official portrait, 2018

Minister of Hydrocarbons
- In office 14 November 2019 – 6 November 2020
- President: Jeanine Áñez
- Preceded by: Luis Alberto Sánchez
- Succeeded by: Franklin Molina

Senator for Tarija
- In office 18 January 2015 – 14 November 2019
- Substitute: Rosario Rodríguez
- Preceded by: María Elena Méndez
- Succeeded by: Rosario Rodríguez

Member of the Chamber of Deputies from Tarija circumscription 45
- In office 19 January 2010 – 14 July 2014
- Substitute: Patricia Paputsakis
- Preceded by: Rodrigo Ibáñez
- Succeeded by: Patricia Paputsakis
- Constituency: Cercado

Personal details
- Born: Víctor Hugo Zamora Castedo; 5 December 1970 (age 55) Santa Cruz de la Sierra, Bolivia
- Party: United to Renew (2009–2020)
- Other political affiliations: Nationalist Democratic Action (before 2004); Revolutionary Left Movement (2004–2006)
- Education: Juan Misael Saracho University
- Occupation: Forestry engineer; politician
- Víctor Hugo Zamora's voice Zamora answers questions regarding efforts to maintain the supply and transit of gas amid ongoing protests, 18 November 2019.

Víctor Hugo Zamora Castedo (born 5 December 1970), often referred to as Ojorico, is a Bolivian forestry engineer, politician, and former student leader who served as minister of hydrocarbons from 2019 to 2020. As a member of United to Renew, of which he was president, he previously served as senator for Tarija from 2015 to 2019 in alliance with the Christian Democratic Party. Before that, he served as a member of the Chamber of Deputies from Tarija, representing circumscription 45 from 2010 to 2014 on behalf of the National Convergence alliance. Prior to entering politics, Zamora was active in student unionism and was the chair of the Bolivian University Confederation as well as his Local University Federation. Though unsuccessful in his first electoral bid, Zamora was later given the opportunity to work in the Tarija Prefecture, and in 2004, he was invited by the Revolutionary Left Movement to contest a seat on the Tarija Municipal Council, where he served from 2005 to 2009.

== Early life and career ==
Víctor Hugo Zamora was born on 5 December 1970 in Santa Cruz de la Sierra, the youngest of six siblings born to José Zamora, an industrial engineer of Cinteño origin, and Blanca Castedo, a woman of Chiquitano descent. Due to his father's vocation, Zamora spent his childhood traveling across the provinces of Tarija, moving from one town to another. He completed his primary and secondary education at institutions in Bermejo and Villamontes before finally settling in Tarija, where he attended the Belgrano School and later graduated from the La Salle School. Coming out of high school, Zamora studied forestry engineering at the Juan Misael Saracho University, where he graduated in 1998. During this time, Zamora became active in student leadership, serving as executive of the Forestry Engineering Student Center. Later, he served as academic secretary of the Local University Federation (FUL), eventually rising to become the FUL's executive secretary. The position catapulted Zamora to the national level, and he became president of the Bolivian University Confederation, representing Bolivia at the Latin American Continental Organization of Students (OCLAE). By the end of his university career, Zamora had risen to become the OCLAE's vice president.

Upon leaving university, Zamora began a career in the private sector, working as a consultant in the development of commodity chains. In particular, he specialized in the production and distribution of wine and singani. Around the same time, Zamora began to dabble in the public sector, becoming an active member of Nationalist Democratic Action (ADN) at a time when the party's regional influence was in decline. The weakening of ADN in Tarija manifested itself in the 1997 general elections when Zamora failed to win a seat in the Chamber of Deputies on ADN's electoral list. Despite the loss, Zamora's political career continued, and in 2000, he was appointed to work within the Tarija Prefecture, serving as director of rural development and later secretary-general of the Prefecture until 2002. On one occasion, he served as acting prefect in the absence of the incumbent, Oscar Vargas Molina of the Revolutionary Left Movement (MIR).

For the 2004 municipal elections, Zamora switched allegiances to the MIR—the dominant party in the department—and was elected as a municipal councillor for Tarija Municipality, encompassing the entire Cercado Province. Within two years of Zamora taking office, the MIR lost its party registration, owing to its inability to obtain two percent of the vote in that year's constituent assembly elections. Zamora subsequently participated in founding United to Renew (UNIR), a departmental civic group composed of ex-Miristas led by Tarija Mayor Oscar Montes. For the duration of his political career, Zamora served as Montes's right hand, sticking by him through UNIR's internal schism in 2015—in which Tarija Mayor Rodrigo Paz publicly split from the party—and eventually rising to succeed Montes as the group's president in 2016. (Note: Montes remained party leader.)

== Chamber of Deputies ==
=== Election ===
In 2009, UNIR formed a component of the National Convergence (CN) alliance, which presented Manfred Reyes Villa as its presidential candidate. Zamora was elected to represent Tarija's circumscription 45 in the Chamber of Deputies, becoming UNIR's sole representative in the legislature.

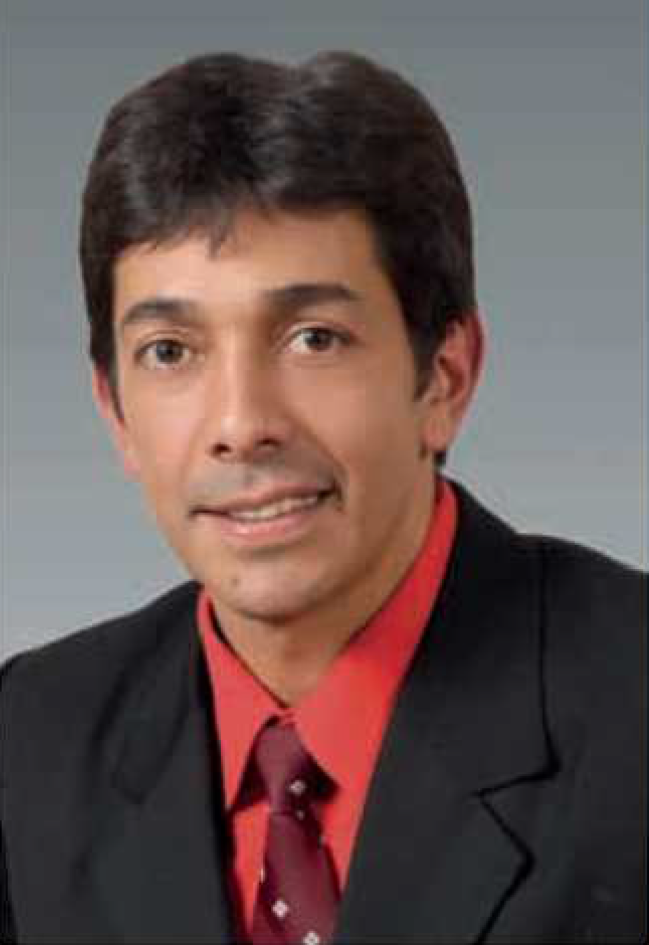
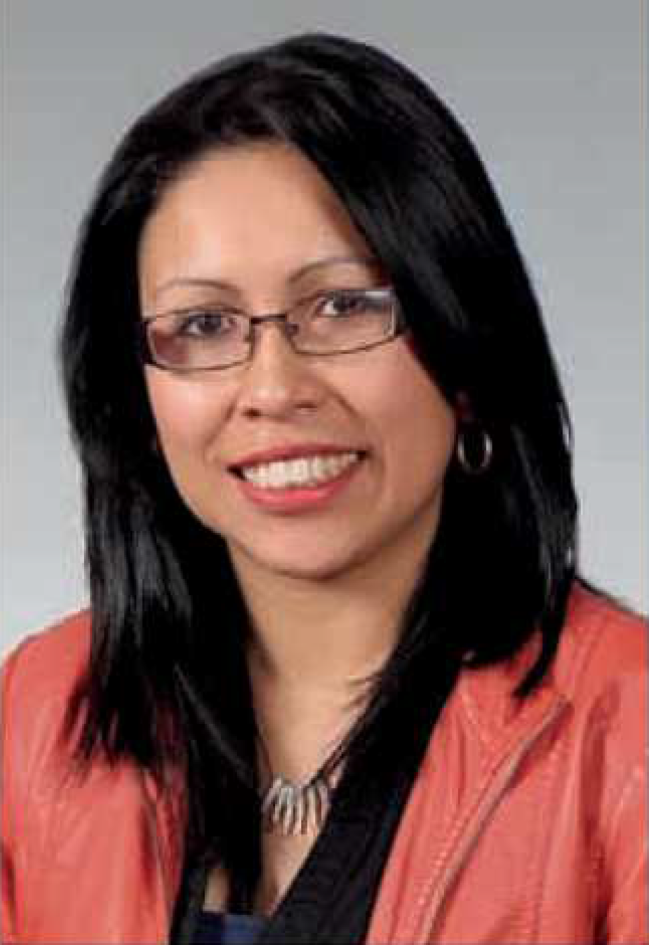
Official portraits of Zamora and his substitute, Patricia Paputsakis, 2014.

=== Tenure ===
In the first two years of his term, Zamora held high-ranking positions on the Chamber of Deputies's directorate, serving as its second vice president from 2010 to 2011 and as third secretary from 2011 to 2012. Throughout his term, Zamora's work focused on projects in favor of Tarija's university system and legislation expanding administrative decentralization and departmental autonomy. In his four years in office, Zamora presented a total of forty-three bills for consideration, of which four passed into law. The first, promulgated on 9 August 2010, declared the literary works of the Tarijeño poet Octavio Campero Echazú to be a component of the country's cultural heritage. In April 2011, Zamora successfully sponsored a bill that declared the expansion of the Villamontes-Tarija gas pipeline to be a national priority. The infrastructure was completed in late 2014, allowing for the transport of sixty-four million standard cubic feet of natural gas per day.

Zamora resigned in July 2014 to qualify as a candidate in that year's general election, bringing his tenure in the Chamber of Deputies to a close. He was succeeded by his substitute, Patricia Paputsakis. By that point, the district Zamora represented had already been set to be abolished by the Supreme Electoral Tribunal, which merged it with circumscription 46 in its redistribution of single-member constituencies.

== Chamber of Senators ==
=== Election ===
With the 2014 electoral campaign underway, Zamora and Montes supported the presidential candidacy of Jorge Quiroga of the Christian Democratic Party (PDC). Quiroga's campaign failed to gain significant traction in the polls, finishing third in the elections at just nine percent of the national popular vote. However, with the support of UNIR and a local faction of the Revolutionary Nationalist Movement (MNR), the PDC saw its best results in Tarija, attaining nearly nineteen percent of the popular vote, electing two deputies and one senator: Zamora. Nonetheless, critics largely blamed the PDC for dividing the opposition vote and consequently granting the ruling Movement for Socialism (MAS-IPSP) a supermajority of two-thirds in both chambers of the Legislative Assembly, a point both Zamora and Montes vehemently denied.

=== Tenure ===
During his tenure, Zamora was characterized as a skillful negotiator, willing to cooperate with authorities of the ruling caucus to achieve the passage of his initiatives. In particular, Zamora highlighted the work done in collaboration with fellow Tarija Senator Milciades Peñaloza, resulting in the approval of about twenty pieces of legislation, including those related to infrastructure, as well as more symbolic bills such as the introduction of a commemorative stamp for the 200th anniversary of Tarija.

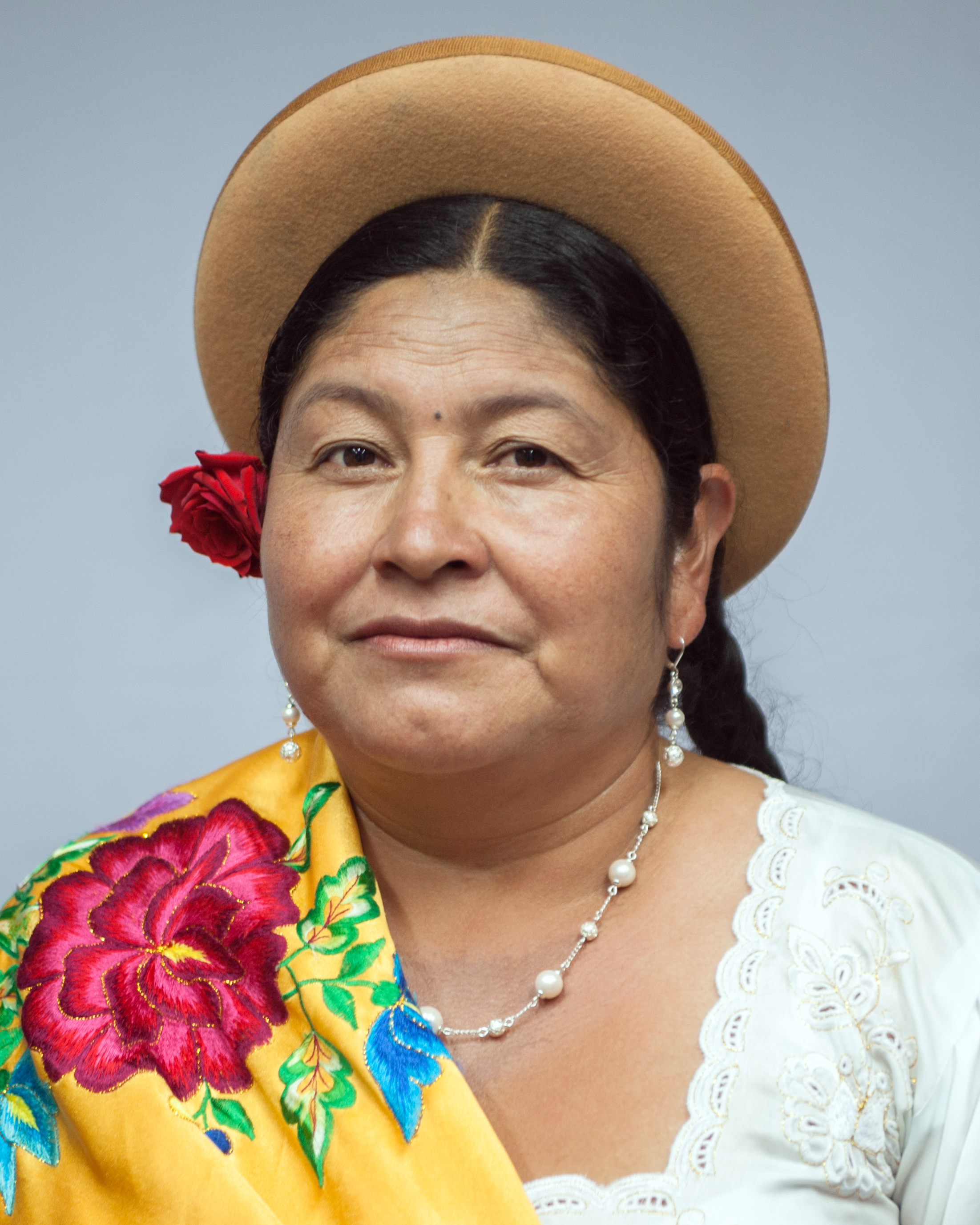
Rosario Rodríguez (MNR), Zamora's substitute.

After nearly a decade in La Paz, Zamora conveyed his intent to retire from national politics at the end of his term, shifting focus to local politics in his capacity as president of UNIR. For the 2019 general elections, Zamora led negotiations on behalf of UNIR with both the MNR and the Social Democratic Movement (MDS), seeking to align the party with one of their presidential candidates. In May, the party settled on the MDS. As the campaign progressed, however, electoral polling consistently placed the MDS below ten percent of the popular vote. Given this, in July, Zamora announced that while the party would still campaign for the MDS, UNIR would not nominate any of its members to run as candidates on the MDS's electoral list. Instead, Montes and Zamora intended to focus their efforts on winning key departmental and municipal races in Tarija in the subnational elections scheduled for 2020.

In the final year of Zamora's term, the Senate's second vice presidency was meant to be headed by the PDC caucus. However, as legislators negotiated the distribution of positions on the Senate's directorate, Zamora opted to chair the Second Secretariat given its broader powers, allowing retiring Senator Jeanine Áñez to assume the second vice presidency, an office considered "boring" and largely "irrelevant". The last-minute change in portfolios ultimately precluded Zamora from assuming the presidency of the country just over ten months later. On 10 November 2019, amid nationwide protests sparked by accusations of electoral fraud, President Evo Morales resigned, followed in quick order by his vice president and the presidents of the Senate and Chamber of Deputies. Given the vacuum of power, Áñez proclaimed herself next in the line of constructional succession, citing her role as second vice president of the Senate to validate the claim.

At meetings sponsored by the Bolivian Episcopal Conference—the Catholic Church's authority in the country—and European Union, the possibility of Áñez's succession to the presidency was rejected by attending MAS representatives. Instead, they proposed that a new president be elected from among the MAS legislators or, if the new president be of the opposition, that it be Zamora. As noted by El País, given that Zamora already held a position on the Senate's directorate, a simple resignation on the part of Áñez would have sufficed to facilitate his succession. Nonetheless, at the time, both proposals were deemed unconstitutional by those in attendance. Even so, among opponents, Zamora's postulation added fuel to longstanding allegations of "collaborationism" between the MAS and UNIR dating back to the 2014 election.

== Minister of Hydrocarbons ==
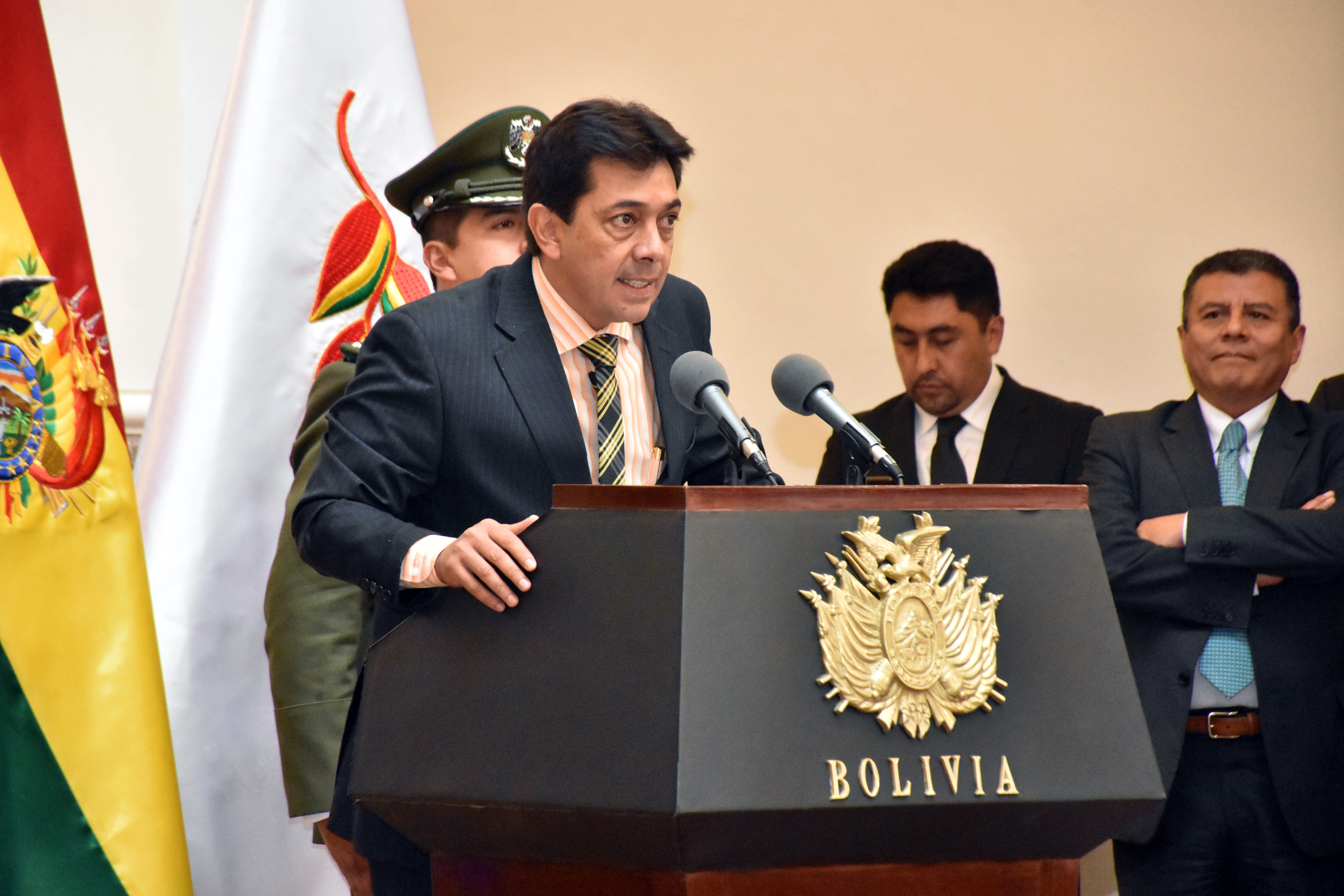
Zamora speaks at a press conference, 23 December 2019.

Shortly after assuming office, Áñez appointed Zamora to serve as minister of hydrocarbons, one of the most coveted portfolios in the country, as it also made him chair of the board of directors of YPFB, Bolivia's largest state-owned enterprise. The appointment of a Tarijeño to head the Ministry of Hydrocarbons was also of particular relevance, as Tarija continues to be the country's largest natural gas producer. Zamora was sworn into his position on 14 November 2019, one day after the majority of the Áñez Cabinet had already been inaugurated, indicating that negotiations surrounding his appointment had taken longer than most other ministers. Given Zamora's close relationship with some MAS officials, several analysts considered his selection to be a gesture to transnational oil companies, guaranteeing "covert continuity" between the current and previous governments. (Note: In that regard, El País noted that Zamora kept many of his predecessor Luis Alberto Sánchez's vice ministers for some time after his inauguration.) Notably, Zamora's late assumption of office meant that he was not present to sign the controversial decree absolving law enforcement from criminal liability in the suppression of protesters, for which many of his compatriots and Áñez herself were later prosecuted.

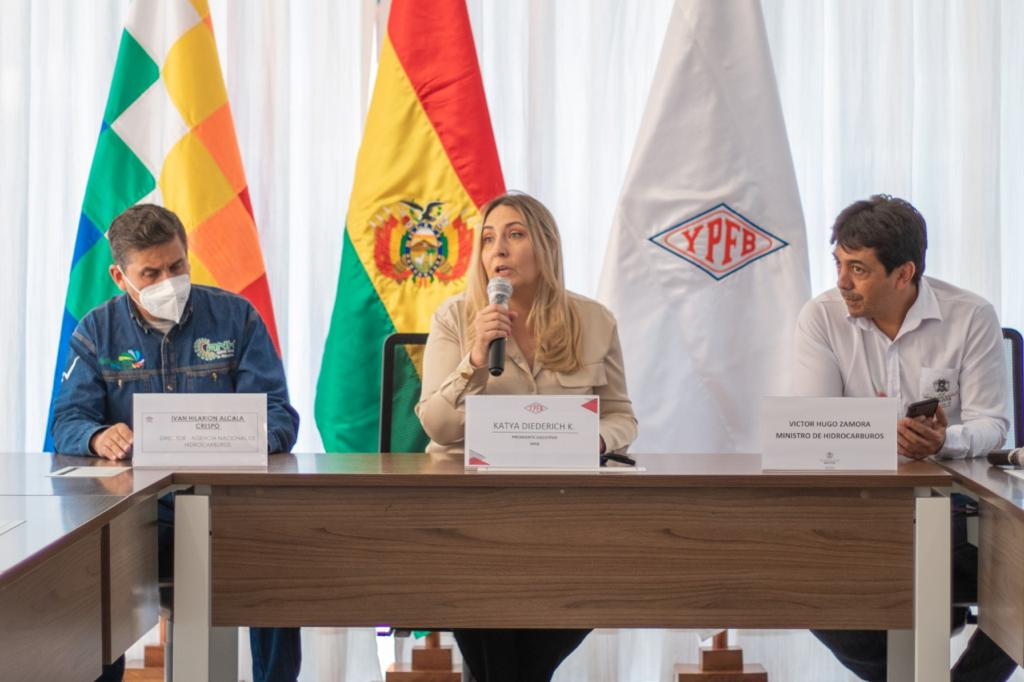
Zamora with other members of YPFB's board of directors, 13 October 2020.

The imminent crisis Zamora's administration faced was the lack of fuel in La Paz, owing to ongoing blockades by opponents of the new government. At the request of YPFB, on 19 November, the Armed Forces moved into El Alto's Senkata barrio, intending to escort fuel tankers out of the local processing plant and into the capital. Clashes with demonstrators quickly devolved into violence, with law enforcement firing live ammunition into the crowd in what an independent investigation deemed a massacre of protesters. In July 2021, Zamora stated that the Ministry of Hydrocarbons had no role in the violent events in Senkata, as it lacked authority over military decision-making. At the time, Zamora blamed the clashes on demonstrators, accusing them of attempting to explode the plant. A later report commissioned by the Inter-American Commission on Human Rights found these allegations to be false but did not directly implicate the minister in the massacre.

When Áñez launched her 2020 presidential campaign, Zamora, as both minister and president of UNIR, supported her candidacy. His decision to align UNIR with the president's Juntos alliance was also initially supported by Montes, who celebrated the fact that the party was represented in the Áñez Cabinet. Zamora even appointed Montes's brother, Amado Montes, as vice minister of hydrocarbon planning and development. However, as the campaign progressed, Montes lost trust in Áñez's candidacy and by extension Zamora. In September, he convened an Extraordinary Assembly without Zamora's presence, in which UNIR's executive board was renewed. Montes was returned to the presidency of UNIR, while Zamora was ousted entirely from the party leadership. Shortly thereafter, Montes withdrew UNIR's support for Áñez, choosing to refocus the party onto the following year's regional elections. Zamora rejected the congress as illegal as it contravened the regulations outlined by Tarija's Departmental Electoral Tribunal. For this reason, the minister stressed that he remained the party's head, ratifying UNIR's support for the Juntos alliance. For his part, Montes demanded that Zamora "dedicate himself to fixing the enormous problems that his ministry has, which ... is much more important than fighting for a presidency that no longer belongs to him". Within days of their public split, Áñez withdrew her candidacy due to low polling, further damaging Zamora's political prospects.

== Flight from the country ==
As with the other ministers of the Áñez Cabinet, Zamora resigned from office two days before the formal conclusion of the transitional government's mandate, retiring to his residence in Tarija, where it was speculated that he might seek to contest the capital mayorship or even the governorship. These prospects were quickly dashed, as shortly after leaving office, the Prosecutor's Office announced that it was investigating Zamora on suspicion of improper use of influence and breach of duties. In July 2020, seven officials of YPFB's legal management department were arrested for drafting Administrative Resolution N° 78/2020. The document authorized YPFB to issue direct contracts of goods and services for the duration of the COVID-19 pandemic, which violated the company's contracting regulations. Prior to its annulment in June, the regulation had been used to purchase an insurance policy from the Credinform company for an amount of Bs49 million and to award a catering service contract to Newrest Bolivia Apoyo SRL for a per-unit cost of Bs416 per day. As outlined by La Paz prosecutors, per witness testimony, the regulation had been drafted in coordination with the Ministry of Hydrocarbons, meaning that Zamora would have been aware of its existence. Shortly thereafter, Zamora was subpoenaed to testify and present his defense before prosecutors. His summons could not be served, with police unable to find Zamora at his declared address nor in two other houses raided in Tarija. On 19 November, a migration alert was issued to prevent Zamora from leaving the country, with an arrest warrant presented four days later. By 25 November, police stated that the former authority was presumed to have fled to either Argentina or Paraguay. In 2022, El País reported that Zamora was assumed to have taken refuge in Brazil, questioning whether he was even being looked for.

== Electoral history ==
Electoral history of Víctor Hugo Zamora
Year	Office	Party	Alliance	Votes			Result	Ref.
Year	Office	Party	Alliance	Total	%	P.	Result	Ref.
1997	Deputy	Nationalist Democratic Action	ADN-NFR-PDC	12,136	11.09%	3rd (Note: Presented on an electoral list. The data shown represents the share of the vote the entire party/alliance received in that constituency.)	Lost	
2004	Councillor	Revolutionary Left Movement	None	32,140	52.33%	1st	Won	
2009	Deputy	United to Renew	National Convergence	25,378	50.97%	1st	Won	
2014	Senator	United to Renew	Christian Democratic	49,339	18.75%	3rd	Won	
Source: Plurinational Electoral Organ | Electoral Atlas

Chamber of Deputies of Bolivia
Preceded by Rodrigo Ibáñez	Member of the Chamber of Deputies from Tarija circumscription 45; 2010–2014	Succeeded by Patricia Paputsakis
Preceded by Rodrigo Ibáñez	Second Vice President of the Chamber of Deputies; 2010–2011	Succeeded by Jorge Flores
Preceded by Juan Luis Gantier	Third Secretary of the Chamber of Deputies; 2011–2012	Succeeded by Roxana Claure
Senate of Bolivia
Preceded by María Elena Méndez	Senator for Tarija; 2015–2019; Served alongside: Milciades Peñaloza, Noemí Díaz, Mirtha Arce	Succeeded by Rosario Rodríguez
Preceded by Jimena Torres	Second Secretary of the Senate; 2015–2017	Succeeded by Particia Gómez
Preceded by Particia Gómez	Second Secretary of the Senate; 2019	Succeeded by Mirtha Arce
Political offices
Preceded by Luis Alberto Sánchez	Minister of Hydrocarbons; 2019–2020	Succeeded by Franklin Molina
