= Mariana Prado =

Bolivian politician

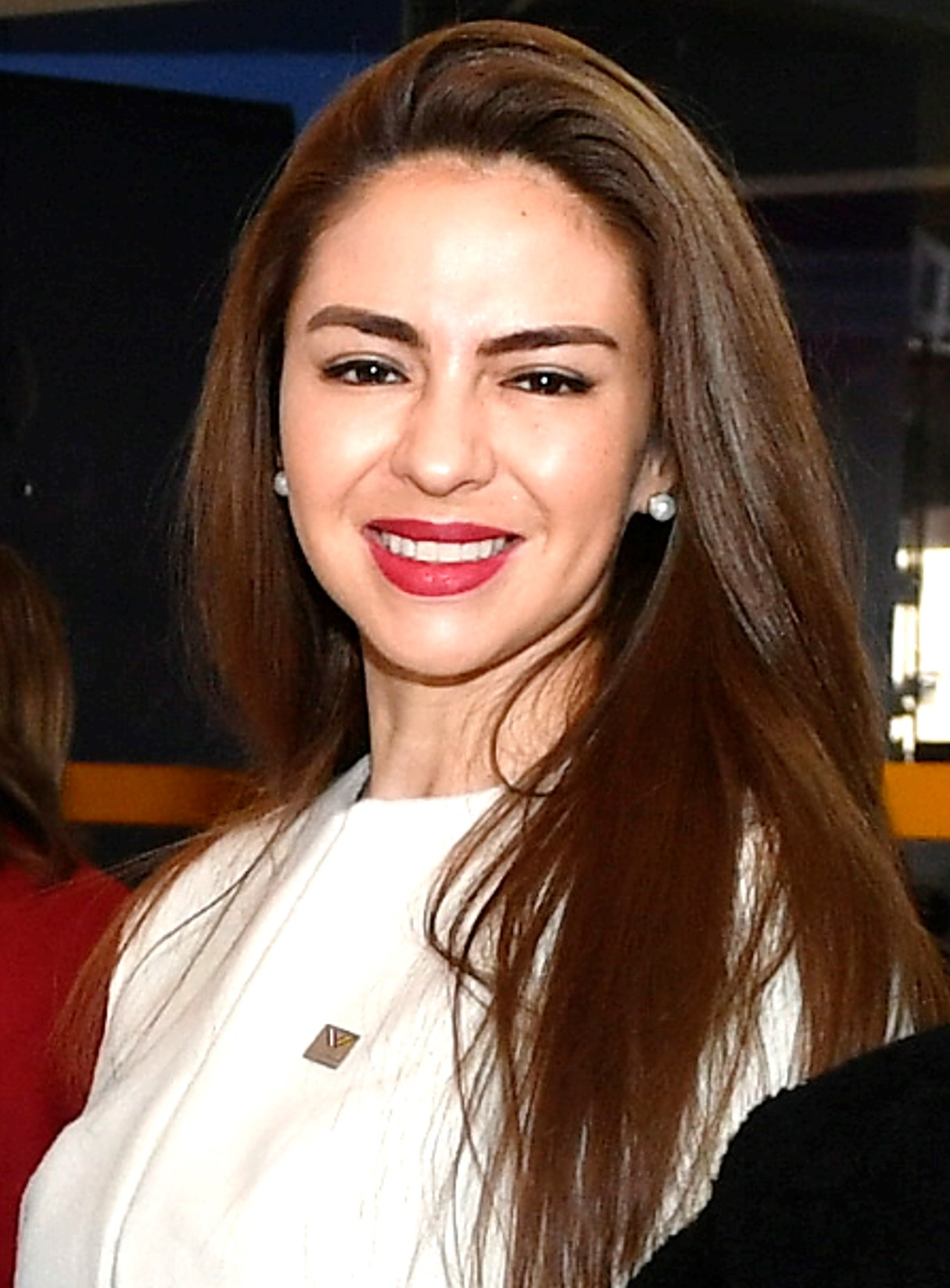

Minister of Development Planning
- In office 23 January 2017 – 10 November 2019
- President: Evo Morales
- Preceded by: René Gonzalo Orellana
- Succeeded by: Carlos Melchor Díaz

Personal details
- Born: Mariana Prado Noya; 20 April 1982 (age 44) La Paz, Bolivia
- Party: MAS-IPSP
- Other political affiliations: Popular Alliance (2025)
- Education: Complutense University of Madrid
- Occupation: Business administrator, politician

Mariana Prado Noya (born 20 April 1982) is a Bolivian business administrator and former politician. She served as the Minister of Development Planning from 2017 to 2019, during the third government of Evo Morales.

She was a candidate for Vice President of Bolivia in the 2025 Bolivian general election for the Popular Alliance.

== Early life ==
Mariana Prado was born in La Paz on 20 April 1982. She began her education in 1987, completing her baccalaureate at the American Cooperative School of La Paz in 1998.

In 1999, she continued into higher education, entering the Universidad Católica Boliviana (UCB) and graduating in 2003 with a licentiate in business administration.

== Studies in Europe (2003–2006) ==
In 2003, she obtained a master's degree in governance and public management from the Ortega y Gasset University Research Institute of the Complutense University of Madrid in Spain. In 2005, she obtained a diploma in French Language and Civilization from Paris-Sorbonne University.

== Professional career ==
In 2006, Prado returned to Bolivia. From April 2007 to December 2008, she worked as a consultant in constructive conflict management at the Bolivian Ministry of Labor in cooperation with West Germany. At the same time, she was the coordinator of Terre des Hommes Suisse in Bolivia from January 2008 to April 2009.

Beginning in May 2009, Prado was an advisor to the office of the Ministry of Public Works, Services, and Housing, a position she held until April 2012.

She was also president of the board of the state-owned airline Boliviana de Aviación (BOA) from November 2010 to April 2012, and advised statesman in the area of hydrocarbons and energy at the Office of the Vice President of Bolivia from March to October 2012.

In November 2012, she became Chief of Staff of the Vice Presidency of Bolivia, a position she held until October 2014. Beginning in November 2014, she served as director of institutional relations for the Plata Basin Financial Development Fund (FONPLATA). She left this position in January 2017.

== Political career ==
=== Minister of Development Planning of Bolivia (2017–2019) ===
On 23 January 2017, President Evo Morales brought Prado into his ministerial cabinet as the country's Minister of Development Planning, replacing René Gonzalo Orellana. Along with Wilma Alanoca (born 1985) and Ariana Campero (born 1986), she was one of youngest ministers under Morales, who made an effort to renew his cabinet with the inclusion of new generations.

=== USAID controversy ===
On 24 January 2017, one day after being inaugurated as minister, it came to public attention through the Bolivian press that Mariana Prado had been an employee of the United States Agency for International Development (USAID), working on support projects for indigenous organizations and conflict management. USAID had been expelled from Bolivia by President Morales in 2013 after accusing it of interference in internal political affairs.

On 26 January 2017, the Ministry of Planning issued a statement through its website in which it clarified the controversies, confirming that Prado worked at USAID upon her return to Bolivia from Spain in 2006, but only for four months.

=== Testimony in William Kushner's trial ===
On 14 June 2018, Prado appeared in the Seventh Sentencing Court of La Paz to testify as a defense witness in the highly publicized trial of William Kushner, sentenced to Bolivia's maximum penalty of 30 years without the right to pardon for the femicide of Andrea Aramayo. Prado was called by the defense because she had been his girlfriend in the past (in 2003, by her account). After testifying, Prado spoke to the media, saying that she believed vehemently in the innocence of the accused. This statement elicited strong criticism from prominent Bolivian personalities, such as feminist María Galindo and filmmaker Violeta Ayala.
