= Riberalta Municipality =

Coordinates: 11.5°S 66.1667°W

- Municipality
- Interactive map of Riberalta Municipality
- Country: Bolivia
- Department: Beni Department
- Time zone: UTC-4 (BOT)

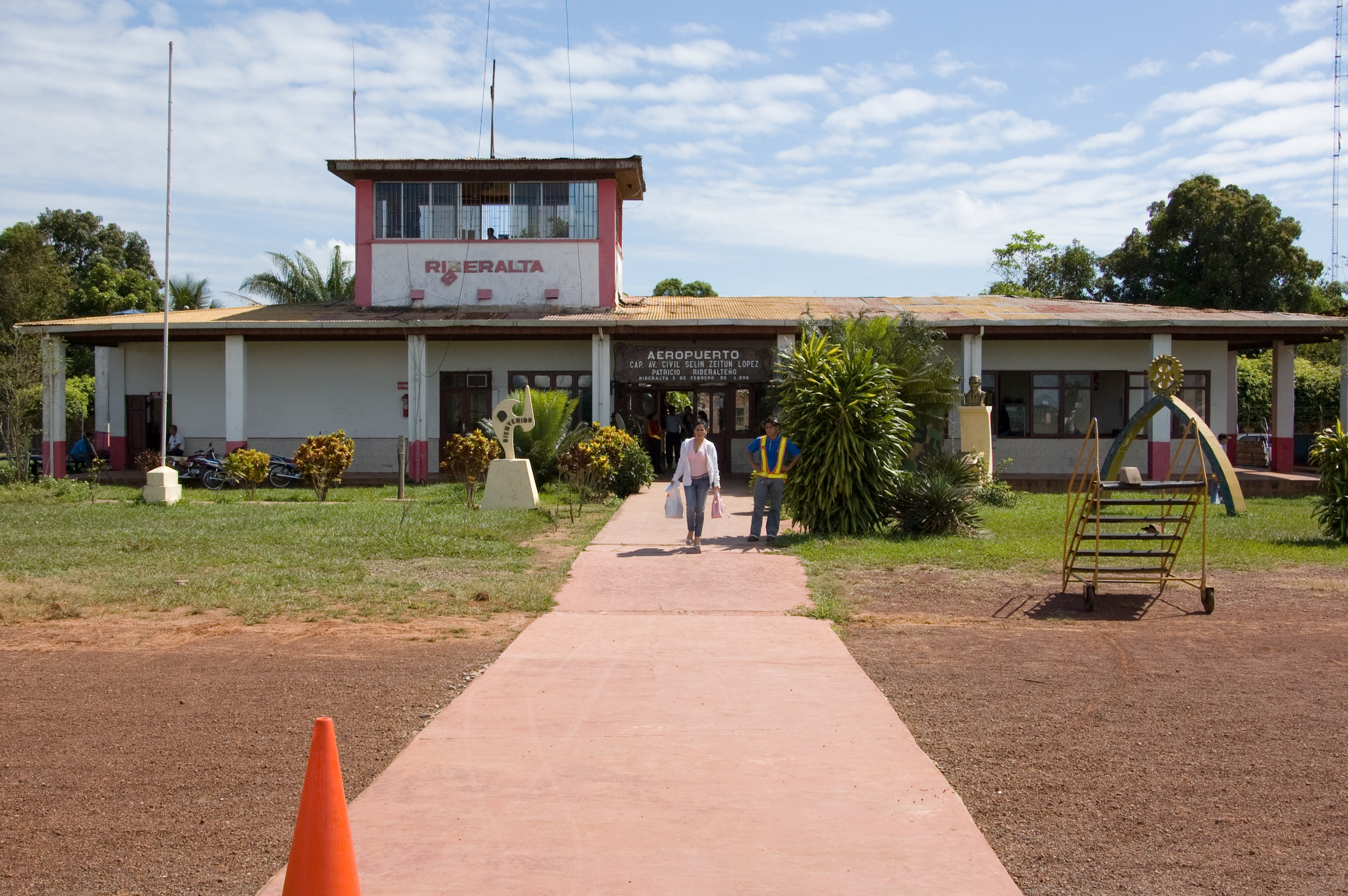
Riberalta Airport, Beni, Bolivia

Riberalta Municipality is a municipality of the Beni Department, Bolivia.
