= Isabel Fernández (mathematician) =

Spanish mathematician

Isabel Fernández Delgado (born 1979) is a Spanish mathematician specializing in geometric analysis. She is university professor of applied mathematics at the University of Seville, and an editor-in-chief of the Revista Matemática Iberoamericana.

== Education and career ==
Fernández was born in Linares, Jaén, in 1979. She received a licenciate in mathematics from the University of Granada in 2002. She completed her Ph.D. there in 2006 with the dissertation Superficies maximales con singularidades aisladas supervised by Francisco López Fernández.

After short-term positions at the University of Murcia and the University of Extremadura, she obtained an assistant professor position at the University of Seville in 2007. In 2010 she was promoted to profesora titular, the equivalent of an associate professor. Her current title is profesora titular de universidad (university professor).

== Recognition ==
Fernández was an invited speaker at the 2010 International Congress of Mathematicians. The Royal Seville Academy of Sciences and Royal Cavalry Master of Seville gave Fernández their 2012 Young Researcher Prize.
