= Jerjes Justiniano Atalá =

Bolivian politician

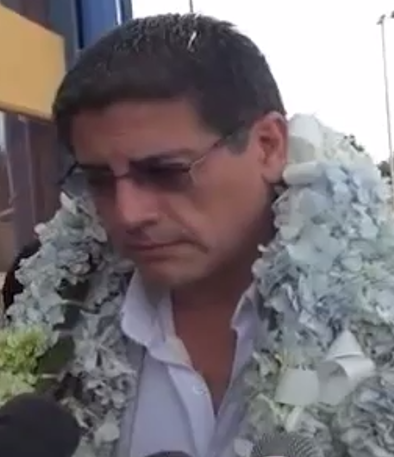
- Justiniano in El Alto in 2019

Minister of the Presidency
- In office 13 November 2019 – 3 December 2019
- President: Jeanine Áñez
- Preceded by: Juan Ramón Quintana
- Succeeded by: Yerko Núñez

Personal details
- Born: Jerjes Enrique Justiniano Atalá; 1970 (age 54–55) Santa Cruz, Bolivia
- Education: Gabriel René Moreno Autonomous University

Jerjes Enrique Justiniano Atalá (born 1970) is a Bolivian lawyer and politician who briefly served as Minister of the Presidency between November and December 2019 during the interim government of Jeanine Añez. During his brief tenure, he was one of the promoters of the meeting and agreements aimed at achieving the pacification of the country following the 2019 political crisis.

== Biography ==
Jerjes Justiniano Atalá was born in 1970 in Santa Cruz, Bolivia. He is the son of Jerjes Justiniano Talavera, the Bolivian ambassador to Brazil. He studied theology at the Adventist University of the Plata in Argentina. In 1991, he moved to Chillán, Chile to continue his studies at the Adventist University of Chile.

In 1994, Jerjes Justiniano decided to return to Bolivia and that same year he entered to study law at the Gabriel René Moreno Autonomous University graduating as a lawyer in 1998 in the speciality of Criminal Law and Criminal Procedure, also obtaining a master's degree in Criminal Law and Criminal Procedure. ^{[ citation required ]}

== Minister of the Presidency ==
On 13 November 2019, Justiniano was appointed Minister of the Presidency by interim President Jeanine Añez. Justiniano promoted meetings with different political sectors in order to reach agreements that would allow for the pacification of the country, and called for dialogue in the face of the escalation of violence that led to the massacres of Senkata and Sacaba. He participated in discussions surrounding the "Law for the Pacification of the Country and to Reaffirm the Exercise of the Rights and Guarantees of the Bolivian People," by which an attempt was made to recover social peace.

Justiniano was dismissed by President Añez on 3 December. The reasons for his dismissal were not official clarified. Unofficial versions indicated that this was due to the accusation of coercion made by then Deputy Minister of Communications Danilo Jorge Romano and to the complain by a prosecutor accusing him of alleged political interference in a rape case, as well as his closeness to the right-wing leader Luis Fernando Camacho.

Political offices
Preceded by Juan Ramón Quintana	Minister of the Presidency; 2020	Succeeded by Yerko Núñez
