= Carlos Huallpa =

Bolivian politician

Minister of Mining and Metallurgy
- In office 18 November 2019 – 8 May 2020
- President: Jeanine Áñez
- Preceded by: César Navarro
- Succeeded by: Fernando Vásquez Arnez

Personal details
- Born: Carlos Fernando Huallpa Sunaga; 1976 (age 48–49); Potosí, Bolivia

Carlos Fernando Huallpa Sunaga (born 1976) is a Bolivian miner, union leader, and politician who served as Minister of Mining and Metallurgy from 2019 to 2020 during the interim government of Jeanine Añez.

== Biography ==
Carlos Huallpa was born in 1976 in Potosí. He was raised in a family of five children and was the son of a miner working at the Cerro Rico. In 1995, Huallpa served mandatory military service in the Bolivian Air Force in Tarija. After this, he returned to Potosí and worked as a miner, finishing high school in 2002, and later becoming a mining leader of the Departmental Federation of Mining Cooperatives of Potosí.

During the 2019 Bolivian political crisis, Huallpa organized a march from Potosí to La Paz to demand the resignation of President Evo Morales. A demand achieved on 10 November.

== Minister of Mining and Metallurgy (2019–2020) ==
On 18 November 2019, interim President Jeanine Áñez appointed Huallpa Minister of Mining and Metallurgy. He remained in the position until 8 May 2020 when he resigned ostensibly due to health issues and personal problems. However, on 5 October Huallpa claimed in an interview that he was made to resign and that he had received pressure to appoint positions in state mining institutions.

Political offices
Preceded by César Navarro	Minister of Mining and Metallurgy; 2019–2020	Succeeded by Fernando Vásquez Arnez
