= Isabel Fernández =

Bolivian journalist, politician, and former Minister of Communication (2020)

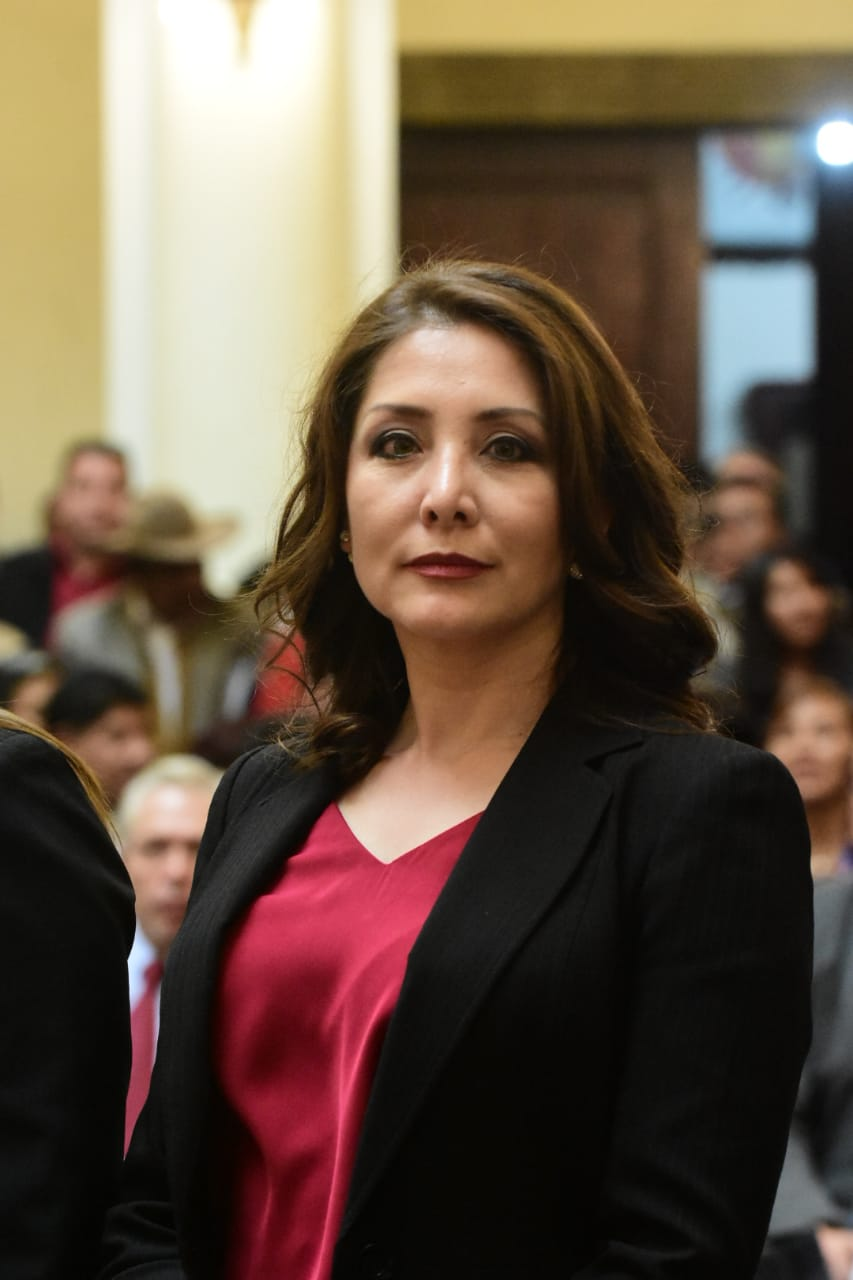

Vice Minister of Communication
- In office 10 June 2020 – 6 November 2020
- President: Jeanine Áñez
- Minister: Yerko Núñez
- Preceded by: Office established (Note: Partly herself; as minister of communication.)
- Succeeded by: Gabriela Alcón

Minister of Communication
- In office 28 January 2020 – 4 June 2020
- President: Jeanine Áñez
- Preceded by: Roxana Lizárraga
- Succeeded by: Office abolished (Note: Partly herself; as vice minister of communication.)

Personal details
- Born: María Isabel Fernández Suárez; 10 March 1980 (age 46) Oruro, Bolivia
- Education: Bolivian Catholic University; King Juan Carlos University; European Postgraduate Institute
- Occupation: Journalist; politician

María Isabel Fernández Suárez (born 10 March 1980) is a Bolivian journalist and politician who served as minister of communication from January to June 2020. Fernández was the final official to serve in that post, with the Ministry of Communication being abolished during her term. She subsequently served as vice minister of communication from June 2020 until the conclusion of the transitional government of Jeanine Áñez in November 2020.

== Early life and career ==
Isabel Fernández was born on 10 March 1980 in Oruro. Fernández attended the Bolivian Catholic University, where she initially majored in medicine before switching to communication studies, inspired by her mother's staff work for Radio Pío XII. After completing her degree, Fernández traveled to Madrid, Spain, where she completed two master's degrees in digital marketing at the King Juan Carlos University and the European Postgraduate Institute. Upon returning to Bolivia, Fernández entered the field of journalism, working on the staff of PAT. After that, she worked as a journalist for a variety of media outlets, including ATB and UNITEL, for approximately sixteen years. Throughout her career, Fernández was an active correspondent during periods of intense social unrest; she likened the experience to "[being in] a lion's cage with a lion inside ... for me it was pure adrenaline ...". Prior to serving as minister, Fernández was serving as the deputy press officer for UNITEL-La Paz, a post she held from 2006.

== Minister of Communication ==
On 28 January 2020, transitional president Jeanine Áñez appointed Fernández minister of communication, replacing Roxana Lizárraga, who resigned days prior in protest of Áñez's decision to run for president rather than oversee a neutral interim government. Fernández remained in her post until 4 June, when the Áñez administration announced its decision to abolish three ministries—communication, cultures, and sports—and two embassies in order to conserve public resources in the face of the COVID-19 pandemic. Áñez characterized these offices as "unnecessary charges", "absurd expenses", and "pure waste" generated by the previous government.

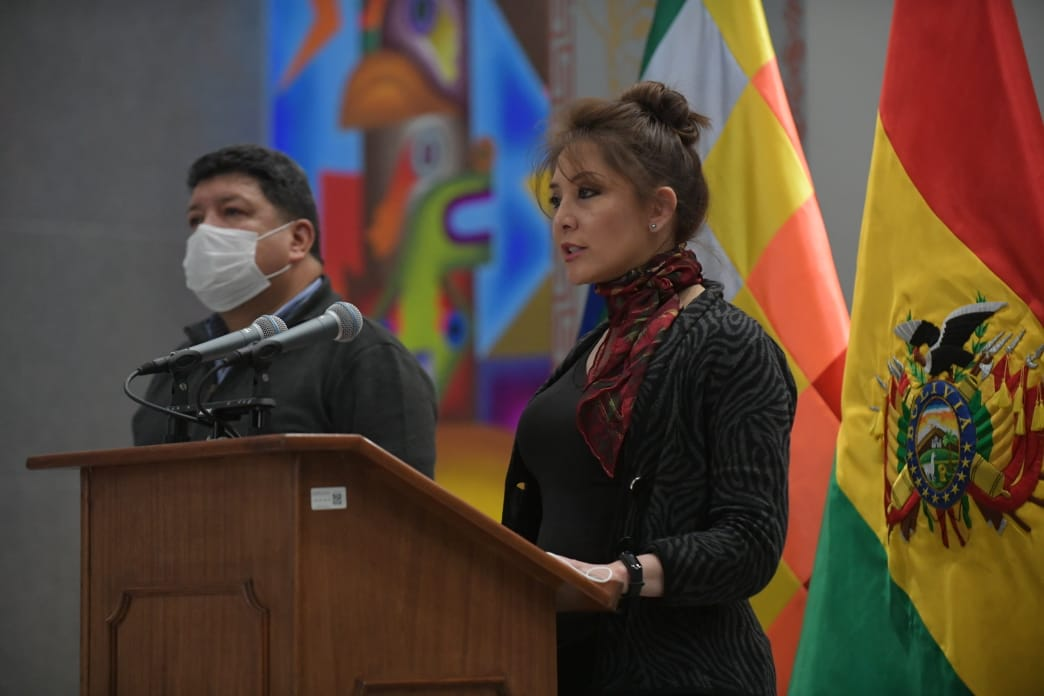
Fernández delivers a press conference, 20 May 2020.

The functions of the abolished Ministry of Communication were transferred to the newly established Vice Ministry of Communication, a component of the Ministry of the Presidency. On 10 June, Yerko Núñez, the minister responsible for said portfolio, appointed Fernández to serve as vice minister of communication. Upon being sworn in, Fernández committed to "[ensuring] strict compliance with access to information, its transparent management, and freedom of expression" in her new post. She also assured that state media would not be used as an instrument of political pressure on journalists. In previous weeks, Fernández had been criticized for withdrawing government advertising from Gigavisión after the channel's director, Junior Arias, had made allegations of corruption within various government departments. Fernández denied any wrongdoing, assuring that the channel lacked high enough ratings to justify continued investment.

With the dissolution of the Ministry of Communication came the termination of all officials who worked within it. Upon assuming leadership over the Vice Ministry of Communication, Fernández announced that her department would only rehire "the people that are needed". She asserted that the now-abolished ministry held "too many officials", many of whom were "not necessary" and spent their entire shifts without performing a single function. On the other hand, some thirty former employees protested that they had been fired illegally despite enjoying job security or being guaranteed reinstatement. Others stated that they had not been paid their owed wages months after being fired.

Fernández remained in office for the duration of the transitional government. She submitted her resignation on 6 November, two days prior to the inauguration of President-elect Luis Arce. In her letter of resignation, Fernández stated that "all these months were very complex, but the satisfaction of duty fulfilled with commitment and loyalty to ... the country remains".

Political offices
Preceded by Roxana Lizárraga	Minister of Communication; 2020	Office abolished Herself as Vice Minister of Communication
Government offices
Office established Herself as Minister of Communication	Vice Minister of Communication; 2020	Succeeded by Gabriela Alcón
