= Branko Marinković =

Bolivian engineer and politician

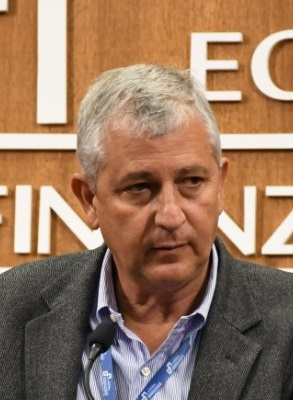

Minister of Economy and Public Finance
- In office 28 September 2020 – 6 November 2020
- President: Jeanine Áñez
- Preceded by: Óscar Ortiz Antelo
- Succeeded by: Marcelo Montenegro

Minister of Development Planning
- In office 5 August 2020 – 28 September 2020
- President: Jeanine Áñez
- Preceded by: Carlos Melchor Díaz
- Succeeded by: Gonzalo Quiroga

President of the Santa Cruz Civic Committee
- In office 2007–2009
- Preceded by: Germán Antelo Vaca
- Succeeded by: Luis Nuñez Ribera

Personal details
- Born: Branko Goran Marinković Jovičević; 21 August 1967 (age 58) Santa Cruz de la Sierra, Bolivia
- Spouse: Nicole Dauelsberg
- Children: 3
- Education: University of Texas at Dallas

Branko Goran Marinković Jovičević (born 21 August 1967) is a Bolivian electrochemical engineer, economist, businessman, and politician who served as the Minister of Development Planning and Minister of Economy and Public Finance during the interim presidency of Jeanine Áñez.

== Biography ==
Branko Goran Marinković Jovičević was born on 21 August 1967 in Santa Cruz, Bolivia. He is the son of a Croatian father and Montenegrin mother who emigrated to Bolivia from Yugoslavia in 1954. Marinković also holds Croatian passport.

He studied electromechanical engineering and economics and finance at the University of Texas at Dallas in the United States. Marinković is important in the Oilseeds Industry in Bolivia since 2000 and is president of the Federation of Private Entrepreneurs since 2004 and vice chairman of Banco Económico.

He was elected President of the Santa Cruz Civic Committee in 2007.

Marinković was an opponent of President Evo Morales.

In the documentary, Who is Branko Marinković, which aired on Bolivian national television, Marinković was depicted as pro-Ustaše, although his father reportedly was as a member of the Partisans. In that same documentary, Marinković is shown as a citizen of Croatia.

In December 2010, Bolivia's prosecutor had filed charges against 39 people, including Marinković, for 2009 alleged plot aimed at killing Evo Morales and starting an armed rebellion. Marinković, and other leading opposition leaders argued that in no way were they are associated with the plot. Marinković was forced into exile in Brazil while fearing for his life. He claimed his innocence and has said the following: "The Bolivian government pursues me and forced me to live outside my beloved Bolivia, because in Bolivia my life would be threatened. I have no guarantees that I would be allowed a fair trial."

Following the 2019 Bolivian political crisis, Marinković returned to Bolivia.

On 5 August 2020, interim president Jeanine Áñez appointed him Minister of Development Planning. He was reassigned to the Ministry of Economics and Public Finance following the resignation of Óscar Ortiz. Marinković held this position from 28 September 2020 until 6 November 2020 when he resigned along with other members of the Áñez cabinet to facilitate the transfer of power to the newly elected President, Luis Arce.

On 11 November 2020, Fundación TIERRA brought a petition to the Bolivian Senate and Courts alleging that he had facilitated the illegal sale of over 33,000 hectares of land to himself and members of his family.

Political offices
Preceded by Carlos Melchor Díaz	Minister of Development Planning; 2020	Succeeded by Gonzalo Quiroga
Preceded by Óscar Ortiz Antelo	Minister of Economy and Public Finance; 2020	Succeeded by Marcelo Alejandro Montenegro Gómez García
