= Carlos Melchor Díaz =

Bolivian politician (born 1967)

Minister of Development Planning
- In office 15 November 2019 – 4 August 2020
- President: Jeanine Áñez
- Preceded by: Mariana Prado
- Succeeded by: Branko Marinković

Minister of Economic Development
- In office 16 June 2005 – 22 January 2006
- President: Eduardo Rodriguez Veltzé
- Preceded by: Walter Kreidler Guillaux
- Succeeded by: Celinda Sosa Lunda

Personal details
- Born: Carlos Melchor Díaz Villavicencio; 17 May 1967 (age 59) Santa Cruz, Bolivia
- Education: University of Santa Cruz de la Sierra

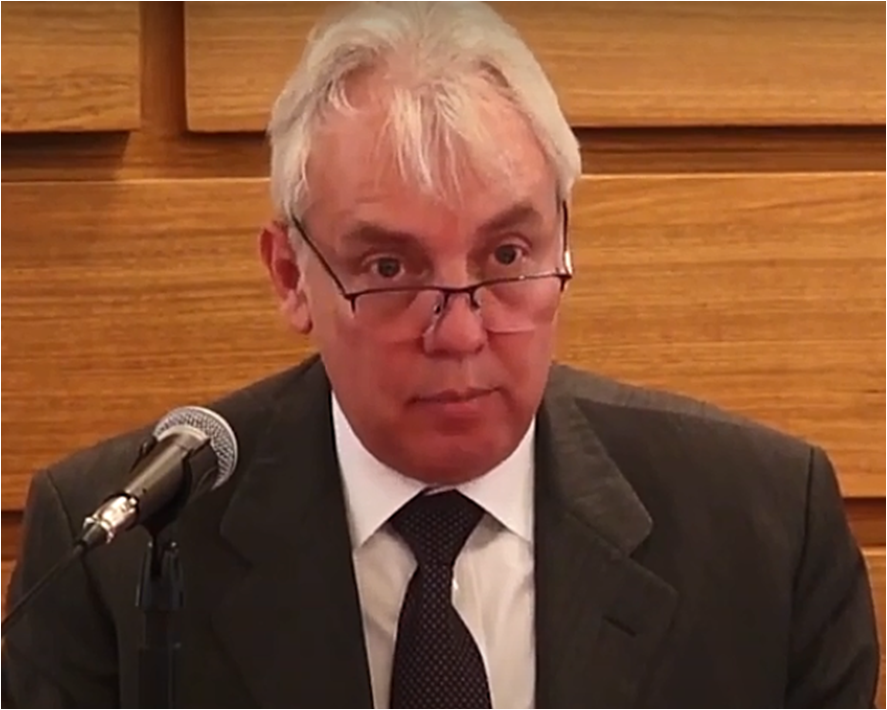

Carlos Melchor Díaz Villavicencio (born 17 July 1967) is a Bolivian economist, professor, and politician who served as the Minister of Development Planning from 2019 to 2020 during the interim government of Jeanine Áñez. He previously served as Minister of Economic Development from 2005 to 2006 during interim government Eduardo Rodriguez Veltzé. As such, he has the distinction as being present in the cabinets of two interim transitional governments.

== Biography ==
Carlos Melchor Díaz was born on 17 July 1967 in Santa Cruz, Bolivia. He graduated as an economist in 1990 and spent much of his career as a university professor. Since 2017, he has held the position of Chairman of the Board of the University of Santa Cruz de la Sierra.

== Ministerial career ==
=== Minister of Economic Development (2005–2006) ===
On 16 June 2005, Díaz was appointed as Minister of Economic Development by interim President Eduardo Rodriguez Veltzé. He held the position until 22 January 2006.

=== Minister of Development Planning (2019–2020) ===
On 15 November 2019, Díaz entered the cabinet of another transitional president when Jeanine Añez appointed him Minister of Development Planning. He served until 4 August 2020 when he resigned for health reasons.

Political offices
| Preceded by Walter Kreidler Guillaux | Minister of Economic Development; 2005–2006 | Succeeded by Celinda Sosa Lunda |
| Preceded by Mariana Prado | Minister of Development Planning; 2019–2020 | Succeeded by Branko Marinković |
