= El País (Tarija) =

Bolivian newspaper

- Type: Daily newspaper
- Format: Tabloid
- Owner: El País S.R.L. - Boquerón Multimedia
- Founder: Jaime Antonio "Jimmy" Borda Campero
- Editor-in-chief: Jesús Cantín Visiedo
- Founded: 13 June 1991
- Language: Spanish
- Headquarters: Tarija, Colón 968
- Website: http://elpais.bo

El País is a newspaper published in Tarija, Bolivia, the capital city of the homonymous Bolivian department. It is a part of the editorial group Boquerón Multimedia.

== History ==
The newspaper was founded on 13 June 1991 by Jaime Antonio "Jimmy" Borda Campero, a Bolivian professional journalist formed in Universidad de La Plata, Argentina. Fernando del Carpio was his associate, but later transferred actions to René Javier Caso Borda and Gastón Vaca Guzmán Aparicio. El País is a member of Boquerón Multimedia, a group which also owns El País Radio, Plus TLT, a TV channel broadcast through the Bolivian satellite Túpac Katari, and El Nacional and El Bermejeño newspapers, as well as elpaisonline.com news webpage. El País also edits specialized supplements such as "Cántaro", "Campeón", "Crónica", "La Billetera", "La Mano del Moto", "Pura Cepa" and "Te Invito".

== Columnists ==
Among its main collaborators and columnists are Carlos Hugo Molina, Adalid Contreras Baspineiro, Jordán Segovia Gareca, Guillem Martínez, Rodrigo Ayala Bluske, Frei Betto, Fernando G. Torres Gorena, Julio César Centeno, Gary Antonio Rodríguez Álvarez, Mauricio Ríos García, Arnold Hagens and Dorys Méndez. El País newspaper publishes an illustrated yearbook dedicated to the most outstanding events of the year in Bolivia.
