= Fernando Vásquez =

Bolivian mining engineer (born 1962)

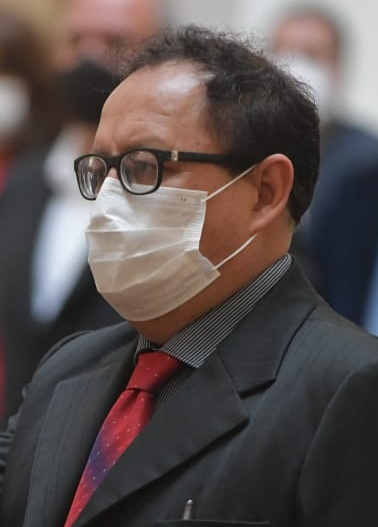

Minister of Mining and Metallurgy
- In office 8 May 2020 – 30 May 2020
- President: Jeanine Áñez
- Preceded by: Carlos Huallpa
- Succeeded by: Jorge Oropeza

Vice Minister of Productive Development and Metallurgical Mining
- In office 3 December 2019 – 8 May 2020
- President: Jeanine Áñez
- Minister: Carlos Huallpa

Personal details
- Born: Fernando Iván Vásquez Arnez; 24 May 1962 (age 64) Catavi, Potosí, Bolivia
- Education: University of São Paulo (PhD)
- Occupation: Engineer; politician

Fernando Iván Vásquez Arnez (born 24 May 1962) is a Bolivian geotechnical and mining engineer and politician who served as minister of mining and metallurgy from 8 May to 30 May 2020. He previously served as vice minister of productive development and metallurgical mining from 2019 to 2020 and as director of the environment and public consultation from 2006 to 2011. Shortly into his ministerial term, Vásquez stated that his white complexion made him incapable of being a member of the Movement for Socialism, causing broad condemnation and his removal from office less than a month after being appointed.

== Early life and career ==
Fernando Vásquez was born on 24 May 1962 in Catavi in the Rafael Bustillo Province of the Potosí Department. He studied at the Junín School before conducting university studies abroad, graduating from the University of São Paulo in Brazil, where he received a PhD in mining and geotechnical engineering.

Returning to Bolivia, he worked as a university assistant and teacher and was a consultant in the field of mining and geology, later being employed by institutions such as the Mining Financing Fund, Hanaer and Sinchi Wayra Mining Companies, the Federation of Gold Mining Cooperatives of the North of La Paz, and the Swiss Technical Cooperation, among others. During the ministerial administrations of Luis Alberto Echazú and José Antonio Pimentel, Vásquez worked as the director of the environment and public consultation within the Ministry of Mining. He held the position until 2011.

Aside from Spanish, Vásquez is fluent in two other languages: Portuguese and Quechua.

== Minister of Mining ==
On 3 December 2019, Minister of Mining Carlos Huallpa appointed Vásquez as vice minister of productive development and metallurgical mining. He held the position until 8 May, when President Jeanine Áñez appointed him to replace Huallpa, who had resigned for personal reasons. Regarding Vásquez's appointment, the president assured that his office "will be one of the most important supports of the Bolivian economy" and assured that she was "entrusting him with a large part of Bolivia's hopes".

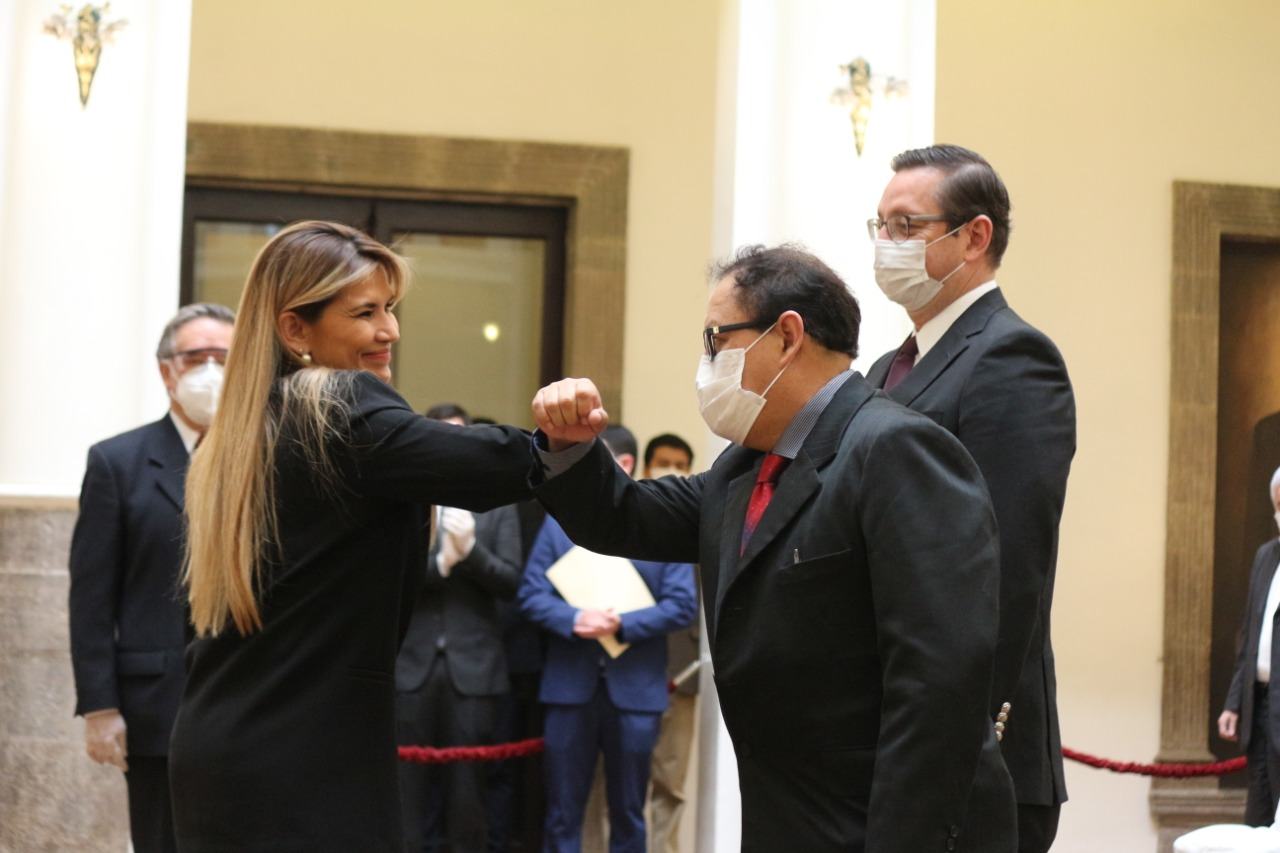
President Jeanine Áñez swears Vásquez in as minister, 8 May 2020.

Due to his previous work in the government of President Evo Morales, Vásquez denied having a connection to the former president's Movement for Socialism (MAS-IPSP) party. In a statement to Radio Fides Potosí on 29 May, Vásquez assured that he was incapable of being a member of the MAS because "to be a Masista there are some specifications, including identity; I have green eyes, curly hair, I am white. I do not want to discriminate, but I think that my conditions do not make me compatible with the rest of the people of the Movement for Socialism". The statement generated criticism from both the MAS and members of the opposition, with National Unity leader Samuel Doria Medina stating that "qualifying others and oneself by the color of their skin and eyes is an act of ignorance and stupidity the size of Illimani. It is inadmissible. The minister of mining must publicly apologize." Vásquez did so the following day, calling his statement "totally wrong" but defending that it had been made ironically, a figure of speech he claimed "is not always well understood".

Nonetheless, the majority MAS caucus in the Plurinational Legislative Assembly released a public demand that president remove the minister. Áñez complied, and on 30 May, she dismissed Vásquez from his post, citing his "racist expressions", bringing an end to his tenure after just twenty-two days. He was replaced in the position by Jorge Oropeza, the former mayor of Potosí, on 12 June.

Political offices
Preceded by Carlos Huallpa	Minister of Mining and Metallurgy; 2020	Succeeded by Jorge Oropeza
