= Oscar Ortiz =

Oscar Ortiz may refer to:

- Oscar Ortiz (Bolivian politician) (born 1969), Bolivian politician
- Oscar Ortiz (footballer) (born 1953), Argentine football player
- Óscar Ortiz de Pinedo (1910–1978), Cuban actor and comedian
- Óscar Ortiz (Salvadoran politician) (born 1961), Salvadoran politician, vice-president in 2014–2019
- Óscar Ortiz (tennis) (born 1973), Mexican tennis player
