= Ferrufino =

Ferrufino is a surname. Notable people with the surname include:

- Alfonso Ferrufino (1942–2023), Bolivian sociologist, lawyer, and politician
- Marcos Ferrufino (1963–2021), Bolivian football player and manager
