= KND =

KND may refer to:

== Organisations ==
- KND Corporation, operator of radio station WKND, Windsor, Connecticut, US
- Democratic National Katarism, political party of Fernando Untoja Choque, Bolivia
- Kan Air (ICAO: KND), airline, Thailand
- Kindred Healthcare (NYSE: KND), US

== Places ==
- Kanda Station (Tokyo), JR East station code
- Kindu Airport (IATA: KND), Kindu, Democratic Republic of the Congo
- Kingswood railway station (National Rail station code: KND), Surrey, England
- Niederdollendorf station (DS100, KND), Königswinter, Germany

== Other uses ==
- Codename: Kids Next Door, US TV cartoon series
- Konda language (Papuan) (ISO 639-3 language code: knd)

== See also ==
- KNDS
- KNDS (disambiguation)
