= Saúl Lara =

Bolivian politician (born 1957)

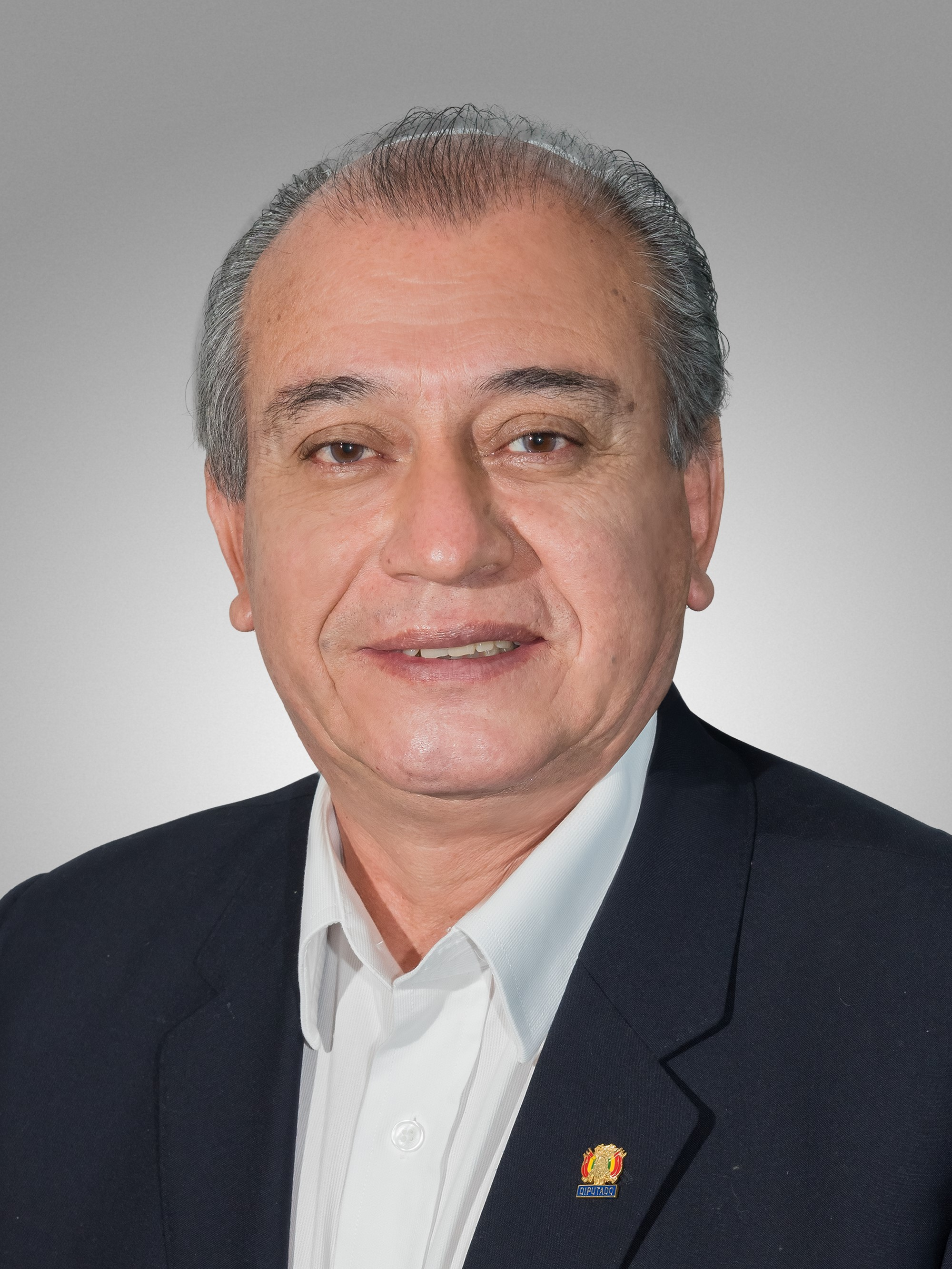
- Official portrait, 2020

Member of the Chamber of Deputies from Cochabamba
- Incumbent
- Assumed office 3 November 2020
- Substitute: Ana María Saavedra
- Preceded by: Shirley Franco
- Constituency: Party list

Minister of Government
- In office 17 August 2004 – 9 June 2005
- President: Carlos Mesa
- Preceded by: Alfonso Ferrufino
- Succeeded by: Gustavo Ávila

Vice Minister of the Interior
- In office 24 October 2003 – 17 August 2004
- President: Carlos Mesa
- Minister: Alfonso Ferrufino
- Preceded by: José Luis Harb
- Succeeded by: Edwin Saucedo (acting)

Personal details
- Born: Saúl Octavio Lara Torrico; 3 October 1957 (age 69) Villa Rivero, Cochabamba, Bolivia
- Party: Civic Community (2019–present)
- Other political affiliations: Free Bolivia Movement (1998–2001)
- Education: Higher University of San Simón
- Occupation: Lawyer; jurist; politician

Saúl Octavio Lara Torrico (born 3 October 1957) is a Bolivian lawyer, jurist, and politician who has served as a party-list member of the Chamber of Deputies from Cochabamba since 2020. A member of Civic Community, he previously served as vice minister of the interior from 2003 to 2004 and as minister of government from 2004 to 2005. A graduate of the Higher University of San Simón, Lara spent much of his career as a legal advisor and consultant for various public and private institutions and corporations. From 1993 to 1997, he served as chief of staff to Foreign Minister Antonio Araníbar, during which time he joined the minister's party, the Free Bolivia Movement, of which he was secretary of finance. Appointed to head the Ministry of Government in 2004, Lara developed a lasting personal friendship with then-president Carlos Mesa, aiding his 2019 campaign to return to the presidency. The following year, he joined Civic Community's electoral list in the Cochabamba Department, netting a seat in the Chamber of Deputies in the 2020–2025 Legislative Assembly.

== Early life and career ==
Saúl Lara was born on 3 October 1957 in Villa Rivero, Cochabamba. He completed his secondary schooling at the Sucre National School before going on the attend the Higher University of San Simón, where he graduated as a lawyer with a master's in national development. A fan of association football, Lara joined Cochabamba's Club Aurora while in university, competing in the Professional League's 1980 and 1981 tournaments. His brief professional career was cut short by a double fracture of the tibia and fibula during a match against Wilstermann, leading him to retire from active play.

In the ensuing years, Lara dedicated himself to practicing law, establishing the firm Legal Bolivia, which provided consultancy to a variety of institutions and companies. He worked as a legal advisor for his alma mater, where he also taught as a university professor at its faculty of law. Over the course of his career, Lara's personal legal services were contracted by multiple public entities, including the Cochabamba Development Corporation, the Cochabamba Municipal Council, and the National Road Service.

During the administration of Gonzalo Sánchez de Lozada, Lara was brought on as a legal advisor to the Ministry of Foreign Affairs. He served as chief of staff to Foreign Minister Antonio Araníbar between 1993 and 1997 and joined the minister's party, the Free Bolivia Movement (MBL), in 1998. Lara remained a partisan of the MBL until 2001, during which time he served as the party's secretary of finance and worked as its campaign manager during the 1999 municipal elections.

== Minister of Government ==
In 2003, in the early days of the Carlos Mesa administration, Lara was appointed to serve as vice minister of the interior. Though Mesa's government was officially non-partisan, many public officials within it—including Lara and his immediate superior, Alfonso Ferrufino—were active or historic members of the MBL. The party's leading cadres held much in common with the president, sharing his urban academic background, an openness to social issues, and a concern for ethics in politics.

When Ferrufino unexpectedly resigned in August 2004, citing health issues, Lara was promoted to the position of minister of government. His tenure as head of national public safety navigated a precarious path, balancing maintaining order amid ongoing social conflicts while simultaneously adhering to Mesa's pledge to avoid police violence and bloodshed where possible. Regarding Lara, Mesa, in his presidential memoir, stated that "without a doubt", he was "the best inheritance [Ferrufino] left me". "I will never stop thanking Saúl for demonstrating to the country that it is possible to preserve order without bloodshed or violation of human rights". However, Lara also faced criticism from peasant groups for his administration's decision to ramp up the government's anti-drug policy, which entailed the eradication of all coca in the Chapare. This despite the fact that Lara had once worked as an advisor to the region's coca growers and had previously defended the legality of Chapare coca.

Following the conclusion of his ministerial term, Lara largely retired from active politics, though he continued to frequent circles opposed to the ruling Movement for Socialism. In 2013, as a representative of the Alejo Calatayud Collective, Lara signed on the Broad Front, a political grouping of opposition activists, organizations, and political parties spearheaded by businessman Samuel Doria Medina. Together with figures like Loyola Guzmán and José Antonio Quiroga, Lara comprised part of the Broad Front's furthest left wing, a group whose representatives ultimately broke away from the coalition when Doria Medina forged an alliance with the right-wing Social Democratic Movement.

== Chamber of Deputies ==
=== Election ===
In the years succeeding his tenure as minister of government, Lara maintained a close personal relationship with Carlos Mesa. When Mesa sought to return to the presidency in 2019, Lara composed part of the former president's campaign team. He directed Civic Community's campaign in the Cochabamba Department, even carrying out campaign events in the Chapare tropics, a region considered the bastion of the Movement for Socialism, where the physical safety of opposition political figures was often put in doubt. Though not a candidate himself in 2019, Lara was nominated for a seat in the Chamber of Deputies when the elections were rerun in 2020, a position he was elected to.

=== Tenure ===
==== Commission assignments ====
- Government, Defense, and Armed Forces Commission
  - Fight Against Drug Trafficking Committee (20 November 2020 – present)

== Electoral history ==
Electoral history of Saúl Lara
Year	Office	Alliance	Votes			Result	Ref.
Year	Office	Alliance	Total	%	P.	Result	Ref.
2020	Deputy	Civic Community	371,826	31.68%	2nd (Note: Presented on an electoral list. The data shown represents the share of the vote the entire party/alliance received in that constituency.)	Won	
Source: Plurinational Electoral Organ | Electoral Atlas

== Publications ==
- Lara, Saúl; et al. (2008). Mesa Gisbert, Carlos D. (ed.). Un Gobierno de Ciudadanos (in Spanish). La Paz: Fundación Comunidad; Plural Editores. ISBN 978-99954-1-123-7. OCLC 263165440.

Government offices
Preceded by José Luis Harb	Vice Minister of the Interior; 2003–2004	Succeeded by Edwin Saucedo; Acting
Political offices
Preceded by Alfonso Ferrufino	Minister of Government; 2004–2005	Succeeded by Gustavo Ávila
Chamber of Deputies of Bolivia
Preceded by Shirley Franco	Member of the Chamber of Deputies from Cochabamba; 2020–present	Incumbent
