= Ministry of Economy (Bolivia) =

Government ministry of Bolivia

Ministry of Economy and Public Finance of Bolivia
- Ministerio de Economía y Finanzas Públicas
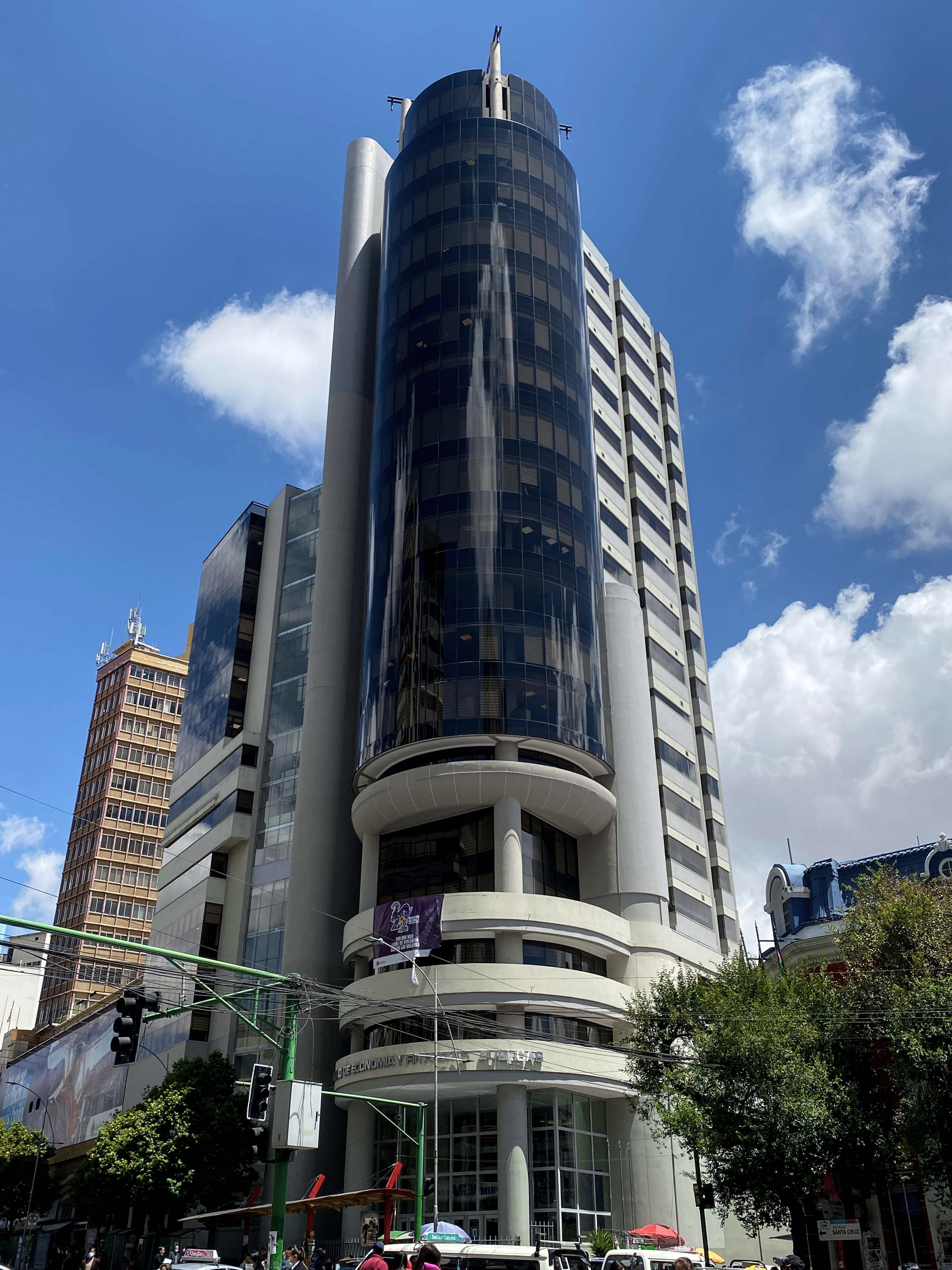

Agency overview
- Formed: 1826
- Jurisdiction: Government of Bolivia
- Headquarters: Av. Mariscal Santa Cruz, in the corner of Calle Loayza, La Paz
- Agency executive: Marcelo Alejandro Montenegro Gómez García, Minister
- Website: Official website

The Ministry of Economy and Public Finance (Spanish: Ministerio de Economía y Finanzas Públicas) is a cabinet ministry of the government of Bolivia responsible for overseeing the nation's public finances and responsible for formulating and implementing macroeconomic policies that preserve stability and promote economic and social equity.

Following the election of Rodrigo Paz Pereira as President in the 2025 Bolivian general election, the Ministry was merged with the Ministry of Planning.

== Ministers of Finance ==
- Alberto Crespo Gutiérrez, 1941– ?
- Víctor Paz Estenssoro, c. 1943–1946
- Edmundo Valencia Ibanez, 1969–1970
- Antonio Sánchez de Lozada, 1970
- Flavio Machicado Saravia, 1970–1971
- Raúl Lema Peláez, 1971
- Edwin Rodríguez Aguirre, 1971–1972
- Luis Bedregal Rodo, 1972–1973
- Armando Pinell Centellas, 1973
- Jaime Quiroga Mattos, 1973–1974
- Victor Castillo Suárez, 1974–1976
- Carlos Calvo Galindo, 1976–1977
- David Blanco Zabala, 1977–1978
- Jorge Tamayo Ramos, 1978
- Wenceslao Albo Quiroz, 1978–1979
- Guido Hinojosa Cardozo, 1979
- Javier Alcoreza Melgarejo, 1979
- Agapito Feliciano Monzon, 1979
- Augusto Cuádros Sánchez, 1979–1980
- Adolfo Aramayo Anze, 1980
- José Sánchez Calderón, 1980–1981
- Jorge Tamayo Ramos, 1981
- Javier Alcoreza Melgarejo, 1981–1982
- Lucio Paz Rivero, 1982
- Alfonso Revollo Tennier, 1982
- Ernesto Araníbar Quiroga, 1982–1983
- Flavio Machicado Saravia, 1983
- Fernando Baptista Gumucio, 1983–1984
- Flavio Machicado Saravia, 1984
- Oscar Bonifaz Gutiérrez, 1984
- Gualbero Mercado Rodríguez, 1984–1985
- Francisco Belmonte Cortez, 1985
- Roberto Gisbert Bermudez, 1985–1986
- Juan Cariaga, 1986–1988
- Ramiro Cabezas, 1988–1989
- David Blanco Zabala, 1989–1992
- Jorge Quiroga Ramírez, 1992–1993
- Juan Pablo Zegarra Arana, 1993
- Fernando Illanes de la Riva, 1993–1994
- Fernando Cossío, 1994–1995
- Juan Candia Castillo, 1995–1997
- Edgar Millares, 1997–1998
- Herbert Müller Costas, 1998–2000
- Ronald MacLean Abaroa, 2000
- José Luis Lupo Flores, 2000–2001
- Jacques Trigo Loubiere, 2001–2002
- Javier Comboni Salinas, 2002–2003
- Javier Cuevas Argote, 2003–2005
- Luis Carlos Jemio, 2005
- Waldo Gutiérrez Iriarte, 2005–2006
- Luis Arce, 2006–2017
- Mario Guillén, 2017–2019
- Luis Arce, 2019
- José Luis Parada Rivero, 2019–2020
- Óscar Ortiz Antelo, 2020
- Branko Marinković, 2020
- Marcelo Alejandro Montenegro Gómez García, 2020–

== See also ==
- Central Bank of Bolivia
- Finance ministry
- Economy of Bolivia
- Government of Bolivia
