= 2019 Bolivian general election =

- 20 October 2019 Annulled
- Presidential election
- Registered: 7,315,364
- Turnout: 88.31% (▲0.41pp)
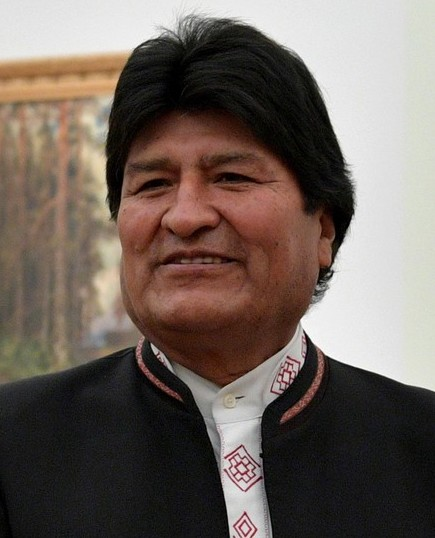

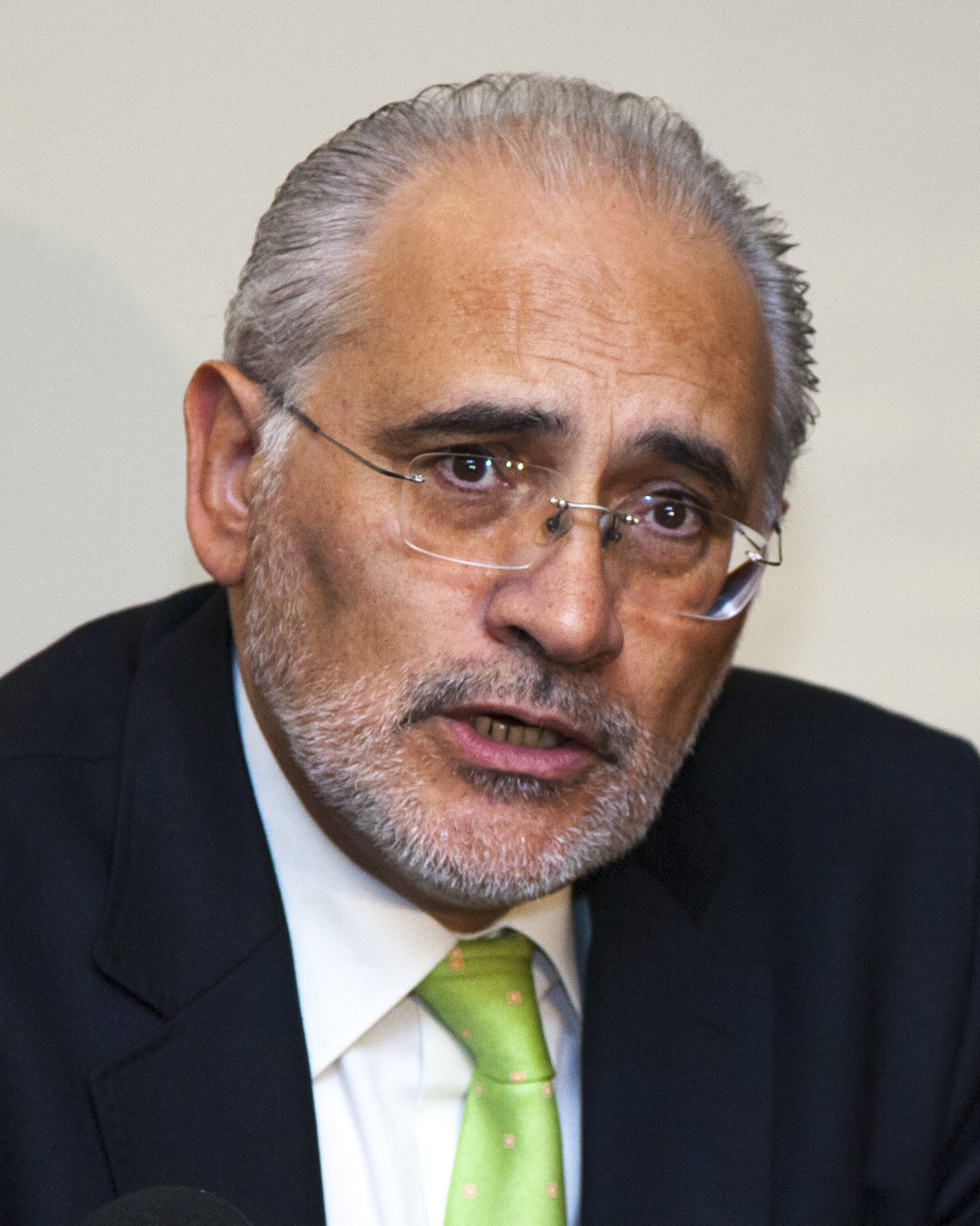

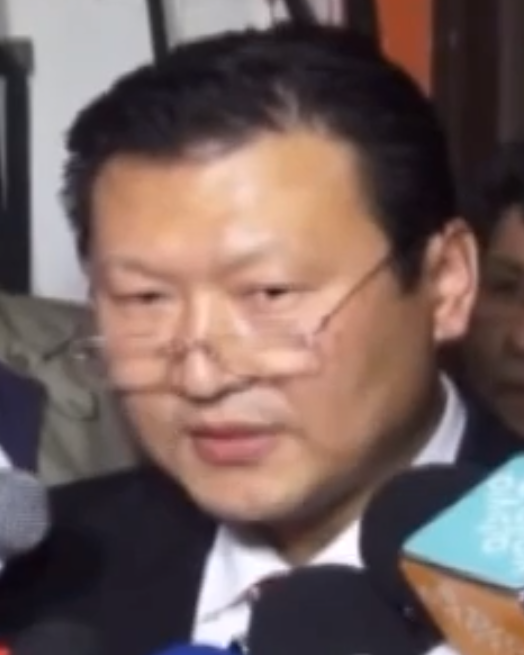
Nominee	Evo Morales	Carlos Mesa	Chi Hyun Chung
Party	MAS-IPSP	Civic Community	PDC
Running mate	Álvaro García Linera	Gustavo Pedraza	Paola Barriga
Popular vote	2,889,359	2,240,920	539,081
Percentage	47.08%	36.51%	8.78%
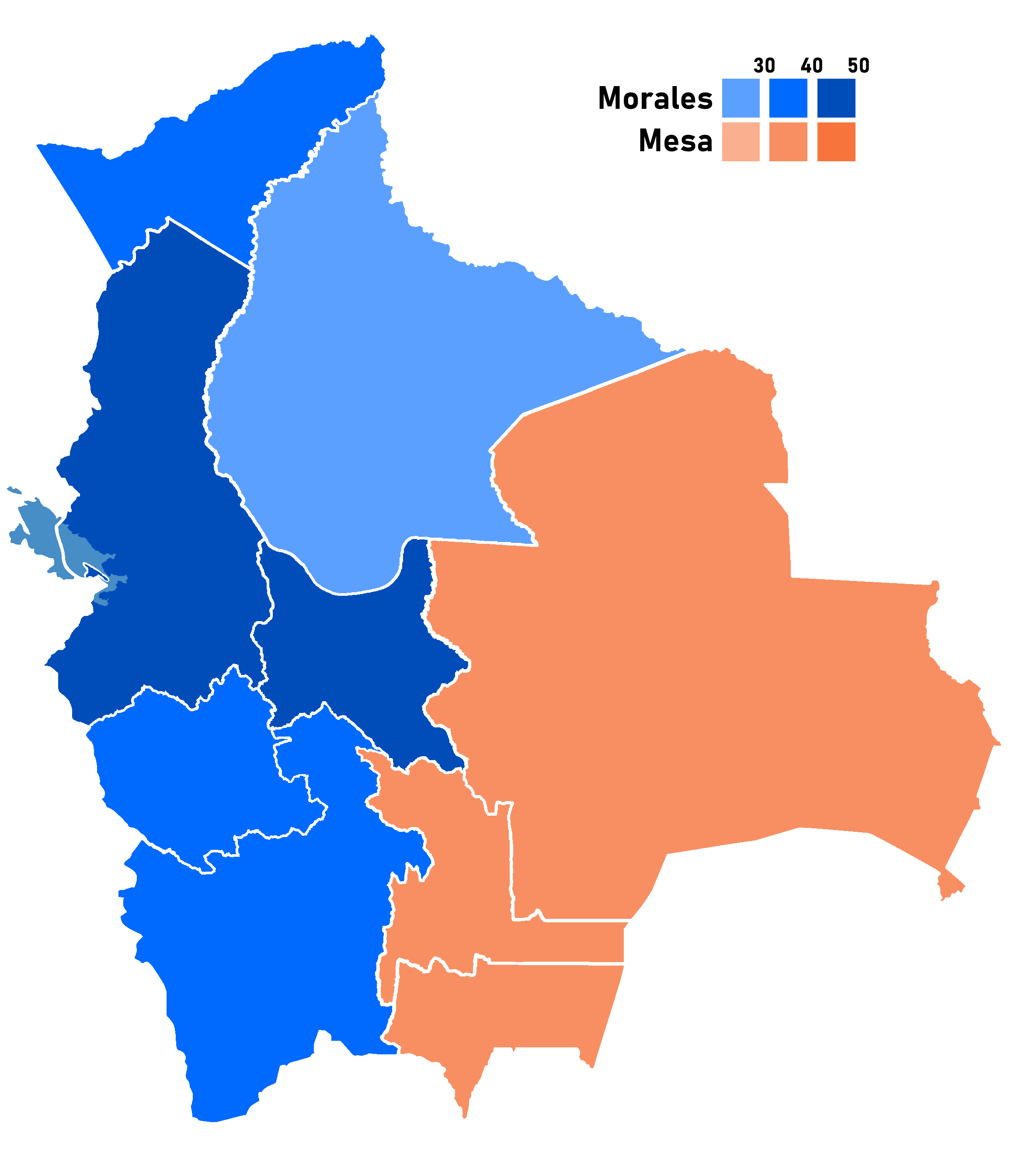
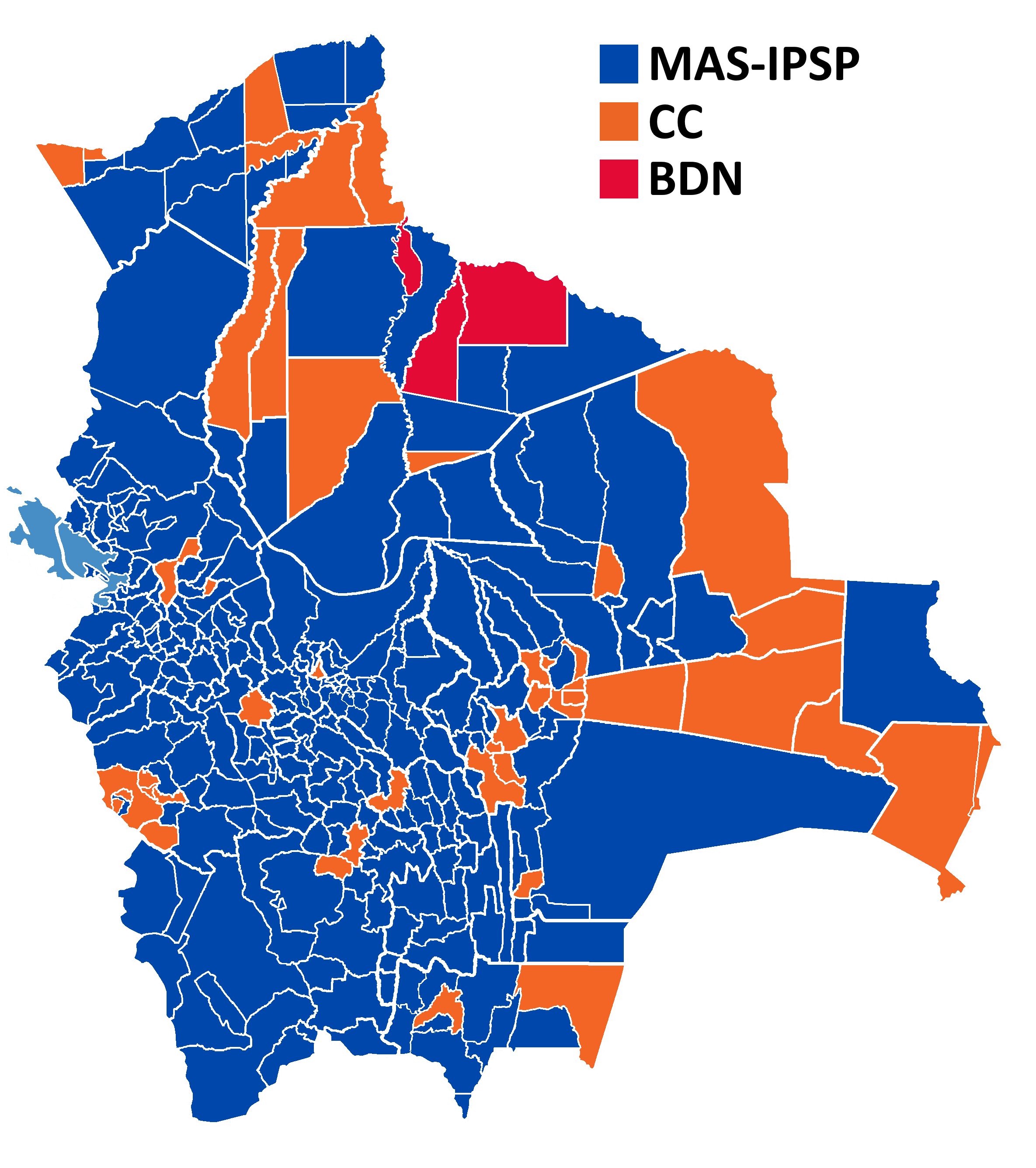
President before election
Evo Morales
MAS-IPSP
Elected President
Election results annulled
Jeanine Áñez (MDS) becomes president
- Legislative election
- All 36 seats in the Chamber of Senators; All 130 seats in the Chamber of Deputies
Party	Seats	+/–
Chamber of Senators
MAS-IPSP	21	−3
CC	14	New
Demócratas	1	−8
Chamber of Deputies
MAS-IPSP	67	−21
CC	50	New
PDC	9	−1
Demócratas	4	−28
This lists parties that won seats. See the complete results below.

General elections were held in Bolivia on 20 October 2019. Voters elected all 130 members of the Chamber of Deputies and 36 senators and cast ballots for a joint slate of president and vice president.

At the time of the elections, the Bolivian constitution limited the president and vice president to two terms, and a referendum in 2016 to amend the constitution had been rejected; the Supreme Court of Justice nonetheless ruled that all public offices would have no term limits despite what was established in the constitution, allowing the incumbent president Evo Morales to run for a fourth term. Disputes over the transparency and legitimacy of the elections prompted weeks of widespread protests in Bolivia after Morales was declared the winner with 47.08% of the vote; because this was greater than a ten-point margin over his nearest competitor, former president Carlos Mesa, this was enough for Morales to be announced as the winner without requiring a runoff second-round vote. The Organization of American States (OAS) conducted an audit claiming "clear manipulation" and significant irregularities, releasing a full report afterwards. The European Union released a report indicating that their observers found many irregularities and chaotic processes in the election. The New York Times later concluded on the basis of a new study by independent researchers and academics that the initial report was flawed as it was released too early, relied on poor datasets and used inappropriate statistical methods. The study found that there was no statistical evidence of voter fraud as the audit had claimed; OAS stood by their report but refused to disclose the full methodology and dataset.

Following protests, as well as calls for a second-round election from several foreign countries, Morales, who had pledged to respect the OAS audit, agreed on 10 November to hold new elections, at a date to be determined. Hours later he and his vice president Álvaro García Linera were forced to resign from office after losing support from the police, the Bolivian Workers' Center and the military. The president of the Senate and the president of the Chamber of Deputies – both party allies of Morales – resigned on the same day, exhausting the constitutional line of succession. As a result, the second vice president of the Senate, Jeanine Áñez of the opposition Social Democratic Movement, assumed the interim presidency of Bolivia on 12 November 2019. Due to the annulment of the 2019 elections, MAS retained their supermajority of more than two-thirds in both chambers in opposition to the government, although they would lose this in the 2020 elections.

The 2019 elections were to be rerun in May 2020, but were postponed due to the COVID-19 pandemic. On 22 June 2020, Áñez approved a law passed by both the Chamber of Deputies and the Senate to set a date for the election for 6 September 2020 and the elected authorities in place by mid to late November 2020.

== Background ==
Article 168 of the 2009 constitution allows the president and vice-president to put themselves forward for re-election only once, limiting the number of terms to two. The governing party, the Movement Towards Socialism–Political Instrument for the Sovereignty of the Peoples (MAS–IPSP) sponsored an effort to amend this article. The referendum was authorized by a joint session of the Plurinational Legislative Assembly on 26 September 2015, by a vote of 112 to 41.

The referendum was held on 21 February 2016 and the proposed amendment was narrowly rejected by 51.3% to 48.7%. A successful 'yes' vote would have allowed President Evo Morales and Vice President Álvaro García Linera to run for another term in office in 2019. Morales had already been elected three times. The first time, in 2006, is not counted as it was before the two term limit was introduced by the 2009 constitution.

Despite the referendum result, the Supreme Court of Justice – referring to Art. 23 of the American Convention on Human Rights – ruled a little over one year later in December 2017 that all public offices would have no term limits despite what was established in the constitution, thus allowing Morales to run for a fourth term. Article 23 states: "Every citizen shall enjoy the following rights and opportunities: [...] to have access, under general conditions of equality, to the public service of his country."

== Electoral system ==
The president of Bolivia is elected using a modified two-round system; a candidate wins outright if they receive more than 50% of the vote, or between 40% and 50% of the vote and are at least 10 percentage points ahead of their closest rival. If neither condition is met, a run-off election is held between the two top candidates.

The 130 members in the Chamber of Deputies (Cámara de Diputados) are elected using a seat linkage based mixed compensatory system using two votes: 63 deputies are elected by first-preference plurality to represent single-member electoral districts, 60 are elected by closed list party-list proportional representation from party lists on a departmental basis (in districts of varying sizes corresponding to Bolivia's nine departments with a threshold of 3%). The list seats in each region are awarded proportionally based on the vote for the presidential candidates, subtracting the number of single-member districts won (to provide mixed-member proportional representation). The remaining seven seats are reserved indigenous seats elected by the usos y costumbres. A voter can only vote in one of either the normal constituencies or special constituencies (coexistence). Party lists are required to alternate between men and women, and in the single-member districts, men are required to run with a female alternate, and vice versa. At least 50% of the deputies from single-member districts are required to be women.

The Chamber of Senators (Cámara de Senadores) has 36 members, four from each the country's nine departments, which are also elected using closed party-lists, using the D'Hondt method. The senate seats are also awarded based on the vote for president.

The election uses the same votes to elect the President (first round), the Chamber and the Senate, making it a double (triple) simultaneous vote. Voters may therefore not split their ticket between these elections, but they may vote for a candidate of a different list in the election of the Chamber as the deputies from the single-member districts are elected using separate votes.

== Primary elections ==
Primary elections were held on 27 January 2019. María Eugenia Choque, President of the Supreme Electoral Tribunal (TSE), stated that international observers had worked with the TSE to monitor the primary election results. She also stated that they had been given an "information seminar" about all the logistic, legal and communications issues related to the primary and had even visited polling stations to make assessments and recommendations. By the time [sic] the primary was held, however, only one candidate had been registered for each of the nine parties or alliances participating in the general elections. Morales received 36.54% of the total primary votes. Revolutionary Nationalist Movement candidate Virginio Lema was his closest challenger, receiving 7.10% of the total primary votes.

== Presidential candidates ==
On 27 January 2019, the TSE announced that nine candidates would contest the presidential elections.

Party	Presidential candidate		Vice presidential candidate	Slogan
Party	Name	Experience		
Movement for Socialism	Evo Morales	President of Bolivia (2006–2019)	Álvaro García Linera	#FuturoSeguro
Civic Community	Carlos Mesa	President of Bolivia (2003–2005) Vice President of Bolivia (2002–2003)	Gustavo Pedraza	#UnaBoliviaMejor
Social Democratic Movement	Óscar Ortiz Antelo	Senator for Santa Cruz (2006–2010, 2015–2020)	Shirley Franco	Las Manos Limpias
Solidarity Civic Unity	Víctor Hugo Cárdenas	Vice President of Bolivia (1993–1997) Member of the Chamber of Deputies (1985–1993)	Humberto Peinado	Rescatemos Bolivia
Christian Democratic Party	Chi Hyun Chung	None (Evangelical pastor)	Paola Barriga	Chi Puede
Revolutionary Nationalist Movement	Virginio Lema	None (Actress and Lawyer)	Fernando Untoja	Hay por Quien Votar
Front For Victory	Israel Rodríguez	None (Activist)	Justino Román	Rodríguez Presidente
Bolivian National Action Party	Ruth Nina	Deputy mayor of Quillacollo (2015)	Leopoldo Chui	#Pan para Bolivia
Third System Movement	Félix Patzi	Governor of La Paz (2015–2021)	Lucila Mendieta	Sistema Comunal

== Opinion polls ==
First place Second place

=== 2017 ===
Polling firm	Date	Morales	Mesa	García Linera	Costas	Doria Medina	Quiroga	Revilla	Patzi	Blank
Mercados y Muestras	January	31%	16%	N/A	9%	10%	4%	2%	4%	14%
Mercados y Muestras	March	26%	20%	N/A	8%	12%	4%	2%	3%	12%
Mercados y Muestras	May	29%	21%	N/A	5%	7%	2%	2%	4%	13%
Captura Consulting	September/October	37%	20%	N/A	10%	5%	3%	N/A	N/A	N/A
Captura Consulting	September/October	N/A	24%	17%	13%	7%	N/A	4%	N/A	N/A

=== 2018 and 2019 ===
Polling firm	Date	Morales	Mesa	Ortiz	García Linera	Doria Medina	Albarracín	Revilla	Quiroga	Patzi	Others	Blank	
Mercados y Muestras	January 2018	22%	N/A	15%	13%	N/A	N/A	5%	4%	N/A	N/A	10%	
Mercados y Muestras	March/April 2018	24%	N/A	14%	8%	10%	N/A	N/A	3%	N/A	N/A	N/A	
Captura Consulting	March 2018	27%	18%	9%	4%	N/A	4%	2%	3%	N/A	N/A	N/A	
Captura Consulting	May 2018	27%	23%	11%	7%	N/A	N/A	2%	N/A	N/A	N/A	N/A	
Mercados y Muestras	July 2018	27%	25%	8%	7%	N/A	3%	2%	2%	N/A	N/A	6%	
IPSOS	August 2018	29%	27%	7%	9%	N/A	3%	N/A	N/A	8%	N/A	5%	
IPSOS	October 2018	39%	25%	6%	4%	N/A	N/A	3%	N/A	7%	N/A	16%	
Mercados y Muestras	November 2018	29%	34%	N/A	10%	N/A	N/A	N/A	N/A	7%	20%	N/A	
Mercados y Muestras	December 2018	30%	39%	4%	2%	N/A	2%	0%	0%	0%	20%	N/A	
Mercados y Muestras	January 2019	32%	32%	4%	3%	4%	2%	0%	0%	0%	25%	N/A	
Mercados y Muestras	February 2019	31%	30%	6.6%	N/A	N/A	6.6%	N/A	N/A	N/A	N/A	16.7%	
Tal Cual	March 2019	35.6%	30.3%	7.3%	N/A	N/A	N/A	N/A	N/A	N/A	N/A	16.7%	
Estudios y Tendencias	April 2019	26.4%	21.1%	5.7%	N/A	N/A	N/A	N/A	N/A	N/A	N/A	16.7%	
Tal Cual	May 2019	38.1%	27.1%	8.7%	N/A	N/A	N/A	N/A	N/A	1.3%	N/A	N/A	16.2%
Ciesmori	July 2019	37%	26%	9%	N/A	N/A	N/A	N/A	N/A	N/A	N/A	12	7%
Captura Consulting	July 2019	38.4%	23.6%	11.9%	N/A	N/A	N/A	N/A	N/A	1.9%	N/A	N/A	18.9%
Mercados y Muestras	August 2019	35%	27%	11%	N/A	N/A	N/A	N/A	N/A	2%	N/A	13%	10%
Tal Cual	August 2019	40.8%	23.3%	10.8%	N/A	N/A	N/A	N/A	N/A	1.8%	N/A	N/A	14.6%
CELAG	August 2019	43.4%	25.1%	12.8%	N/A	N/A	N/A	N/A	N/A	3.1%	N/A	7.8%	5.0%
Mercados y Muestras (Nacional)	September 2019	34.4%	27.1%	13%	N/A	N/A	N/A	N/A	N/A	1%	N/A	2%	5.0%
CELAG	October 2019	38.8%	25.4%	11.3%	N/A	N/A	N/A	N/A	N/A	3.2%	5.2%	10.4%	5.7%

== Results ==
Two independent vote count processes were used for the elections. The first one, Transmisión de Resultados Electorales Preliminares (TREP), is a quick count process based on photographs that is meant to provide a preliminary result on election day. The second process is the traditional physical count that takes more time to complete.

With a preliminary vote count of 45% for incumbent president Evo Morales and 38% for his leading challenger, former president Carlos Mesa, after 83% of votes were counted, neither of the conditions for a first-round win appeared likely to be met. A second-round runoff vote between those two candidates would therefore be held on 15 December. However, no further updates to the preliminary results were made after 19:40 hours local time on election day, which caused consternation among opposition politicians and election monitors deployed by the Organization of American States (OAS); Mesa described the suspension as "extremely serious" and spoke of manipulation; the OAS requested an explanation for the pause in the publication of the vote tally. But while the vote tally was not being publicized, election staff were still observed counting votes overnight.

After the publication of the count resumed, the OAS said it observed a "drastic and hard-to-explain change in the trend", and recommended a runoff election due to what the OAS viewed as manipulation.

Bolivia's Supreme Electoral Tribunal (TSE), stated that updates to the preliminary count had been halted because the official results were starting to be released. The TSE also stated the vote had taken place normally and with relatively few incidents.

On 24 October 2019, Morales officially declared outright victory following a counting process which gave him 46.83% of the vote against Mesa's 36.7%, with only few votes remaining to be counted. Though the process was deemed controversial, Morales stated that he was still open to a second round runoff if the process later determined that he did not receive the required 10 percentage point victory margin needed in order to avoid a runoff. Cómputo Electoral concluded its counting that very same day, with final results showing Morales with 47.07% of the vote and Mesa with 36.51%. This gave Morales a victory margin of more than 10 percentage points and thus prevented a second round runoff. This was the first election since his first win in which Morales obtained less than 50% of the vote. On the morning of 25 October, the election results were made official.

Some ballots, accounting for 0.01% of the electorate, were voided in the department of Beni. A redo session was scheduled for those affected on 3 November 2019, but the electoral commission said that those votes would not change the outcome of the presidential vote. On 25 October 2019 the TSE cancelled the redo session after neither MAS nor 'Bolivia Dice No' protested the inclusion of the annulled ballots.

=== President ===
Candidate	Running mate	Party	Votes	%
Evo Morales	Álvaro García Linera	Movement for Socialism	2,889,359	47.08
Carlos Mesa	Gustavo Pedraza	Civic Community	2,240,920	36.51
Chi Hyun Chung	Paola Barriga	Christian Democratic Party	539,081	8.78
Óscar Ortiz Antelo	Shirley Franco	Social Democratic Movement	260,316	4.24
Félix Patzi	Lucila Mendieta	Third System Movement	76,827	1.25
Virginio Lema	Fernando Untoja Choque	Revolutionary Nationalist Movement	42,334	0.69
Ruth Nina	Leopoldo Chui	Bolivian National Action Party	39,826	0.65
Víctor Hugo Cárdenas	Humberto Peinado	Solidarity Civic Unity	25,283	0.41
Israel Rodriquez	Justino Román	Front For Victory	23,725	0.39
Total			6,137,671	100.00
Valid votes			6,137,671	95.00
Invalid votes			229,337	3.55
Blank votes			93,507	1.45
Total votes			6,460,515	100.00
Registered voters/turnout			7,315,364	88.31
Source: Cómputo Electoral, OEP

=== Chamber of Deputies ===
Party	Proportional			Constituency			Indigenous			Total seats	+/–
Party	Votes	%	Seats	Votes	%	Seats	Votes	%	Seats	Total seats	+/–
Movement for Socialism	2,768,712	46.64	18	2,057,345	42.33	42	24,025	56.22	7	67	–21
Civic Community	2,186,352	36.83	33	1,537,860	31.64	17	9,453	22.12	0	50	New
Christian Democratic Party	522,582	8.80	9	138,771	2.86	0	574	1.34	0	9	–1
Social Democratic Movement	256,937	4.33	0	649,090	13.36	4	4,962	11.61	0	4	New
Third System Movement	75,532	1.27	0	182,175	3.75	0	2,853	6.68	0	0	0
Revolutionary Nationalist Movement	41,043	0.69	0	125,133	2.57	0				0	0
Bolivian National Action Party	37,844	0.64	0	51,552	1.06	0				0	0
Solidarity Civic Unity	24,011	0.40	0	81,346	1.67	0	565	1.32	0	0	0
Front For Victory	23,029	0.39	0	36,867	0.76	0	305	0.71	0	0	0
Total	5,936,042	100.00	60	4,860,139	100.00	63	42,737	100.00	7	130	0
Valid votes	5,936,042	94.97		4,860,139	78.70		42,737	60.68			
Invalid votes	222,882	3.57		156,731	2.54		1,884	2.68			
Blank votes	91,640	1.47		1,158,587	18.76		25,806	36.64			
Total votes	6,250,564	100.00		6,175,457	100.00		70,427	100.00			
Registered voters/turnout	6,974,363	89.62		6,932,733	89.08		144,200	48.84			
Source: OEP, OEP

=== Chamber of Senators ===
Party	Votes	%	Seats	+/–
Movement for Socialism	2,768,712	46.64	21	–4
Civic Community	2,186,352	36.83	14	New
Christian Democratic Party	522,582	8.80	0	–2
Social Democratic Movement	256,937	4.33	1	New
Third System Movement	75,532	1.27	0	0
Revolutionary Nationalist Movement	41,043	0.69	0	0
Bolivian National Action Party	37,844	0.64	0	0
Solidarity Civic Unity	24,011	0.40	0	0
Front For Victory	23,029	0.39	0	0
Total	5,936,042	100.00	36	0
Valid votes	5,936,042	94.97		
Invalid votes	222,882	3.57		
Blank votes	91,640	1.47		
Total votes	6,250,564	100.00		
Registered voters/turnout	6,974,363	89.62		
Source: Cómputo Electoral, OEP

=== Controversy ===
The pause in results transmission for 24 hours, which took Morales from a tight race with Mesa to an outright win, was challenged by people in Bolivia and other countries, who questioned the legitimacy of the results. Protesters and opposition politicians called for a second round to be held despite Morales' lead, as did the governments of Brazil, Argentina, Colombia, the United States, and the European Union. Support for the results of the election came from the governments of Mexico, Nicaragua, Venezuela, Cuba, Palestine, the Non-Aligned Movement and the new President-elect of Argentina.

The day after the election the vice-president of the TSE Antonio Costas resigned, citing his disagreement with the decision to stop transmitting results. The president of the Santa Cruz Electoral Tribunal Sandra Kettels also resigned on 30 October.

After an updated vote tally was announced on Friday 25 October, including previously annulled ballots in Beni, the United Nations announced that it supported an audit of the process and results, to be carried out by the OAS. Responding to concerns about vote tampering and violent protests, Morales asked the Organization of American States (OAS) to conduct an audit of the vote count. Morales said he would call for a second-round runoff vote with Mesa if the OAS audit found evidence of fraud.

On 27 October, Morales declared that a coup d'état was in the making against his government, saying that political rivals were planning to stage a coup the following week. On 6 November, the opposition published a report stating there had been electoral fraud, including cases where MAS allegedly obtained more votes than the number of registered voters.

=== Results of OAS audit ===
On 10 November, the Organization of American States Electoral Observation Mission in Bolivia published a preliminary report of the audit conducted during the elections. The report found significant irregularities overseen by the Electoral Commission, including widespread data manipulation and altered and forged records. adding that it was statistically unlikely that Morales had secured the 10-percentage-point margin of victory needed to win outright, saying that election should be annulled after it had found "clear manipulations" of the voting system that called into question Morales' win and that "The manipulations to the computer systems are of such magnitude that they must be deeply investigated by the Bolivian State to get to the bottom of and assign responsibility in this serious case. The OAS recommended new elections and appointment of a new elections commission.

Within hours, Morales announced that fresh elections would take place. By late afternoon of that day, Morales and his vice president, Álvaro García Linera, resigned from office after losing support from the police, the military, and former political allies. Adriana Salvatierra Arriaza, the president of the Bolivian Senate, was next in the line of succession, but she too resigned from office on 10 November.

=== Analyses of the election ===
==== Prior to Morales's resignation ====
On 5 November, Professor Walter R. Mebane at the University of Michigan used his own "eforensics" model to detect and predict the level of fraud that occurred during the election. He estimated that there were between 20,450 and 24,664 fraudulent votes which were subdivided into votes that were abstentions (no votes) that were then transferred to MAS and votes that were initially for other parties but later changed to MAS. With this level of fraud, he initially determined that it would not have been enough to change the results of the elections (Morales would have had a margin of 10.16-10.27%, depending on assumptions) although on 13 November Mebane said that feedback from colleagues led him to believe that "best formula" for the model led to a new reallocation which indicated that Morales would have had a lead of 9.9% over Mesa, requiring a runoff election.

On 8 November 2019, Ethical Hacking, the tech security company hired by the TSE (under Morales) to audit the elections, stated that there were multiple irregularities and violations of procedure and that "our function as an auditor security company is to declare everything that was found, and much of what was found supports the conclusion that the electoral process be declared null and void". In their official report, one source for the OAS, they stated "We cannot attest to the integrity of the electoral results because the entire process is null and void due to the number of alterations to the TREP source code, the number of accesses and manual modifications with the maximum privileges to the databases being created during the electoral process and the inconsistencies in the software that arose in the TREP and Computo."

On 12 November, the OAS's preliminary conclusions were contradicted by a separate analysis by the Center for Economic and Policy Research (CEPR), a left-wing policy think-tank based in Washington. The CEPR report said the OAS "provided no evidence to support these statements suggesting that the quick count could be wrong" and postulated that the irregularities they perceived were instead merely the result of normal geographic voting patterns, noting that "later-reporting areas are often politically and demographically different from earlier ones". The CEPR report argued that due to Morales' voter base being in more rural regions, the later-arriving results from peripheral areas were more likely to be in his favor.

==== OAS and EU full reports and responses ====
On 5 December, the full 95-page OAS report was released along with 500 pages of corroborating details as appendices. The audit involved the work of 36 specialists and auditors of 18 nationalities including electoral lawyers, statisticians, computer experts, specialists in documents, calligraphy, chain of custody and electoral organization. The findings included that an outside user who controlled a Linux AMI appliance with "root privileges" — conferring the ability to alter results — accessed the official vote-counting server during the counting and that in a sample of 4,692 returns from polling stations around the country, 226 showed multiple signatures by the same person for different voting booths, a violation of electoral law. On those returns, 91 per cent of votes went to MAS, approximately double the rate recorded elsewhere. The identity of this user was later claimed to be Sergio Martínez, who subsequently fled the country.

On 21 December, the Technical Mission of Electoral Experts sent by the European Union published a 67-page report made similar observations and conclusions to that of the OAS. They noted that "there were minutes with an unusually high number of null votes, blank votes and a hundred percent participation of voters in a series of polling stations" and highlighted the general failure of the TSE to declare these irregularities.

On 27 February 2020, a further CEPR statistical analysis was published via The Washington Post. The work was carried out by Jack Williams and John Curiel, MIT researchers working as independent contractors for CEPR. The researchers stated that "there is not any statistical evidence of fraud that we can find — the trends in the preliminary count, the lack of any big jump in support for Morales after the halt, and the size of Morales's margin all appear legitimate. All in all, the OAS's statistical analysis and conclusions would appear deeply flawed" and that "it is highly likely that Morales surpassed the 10-percentage-point margin in the first round" as originally presented.

After the Washington Post article, Bolivian government officials wrote to MIT about the report. The MIT Associate Provost for International Activities responded stating "this study was conducted independently of MIT... it should be referred to as a CEPR study... we do not endorse or otherwise offer an opinion on the findings". Bolivian newspaper, Página Siete, notes that one of the authors of the report, Jack Williams, had previously signed a letter to the US Congress to oppose the "military coup" in Bolivia and which supported the previous CEPR study. The OAS reiterated their criticisms of the original CEPR report and issued a statement to say that "the mentioned article contains multiple falsehoods, inaccuracies and omissions." Bolivian Minister for Foreign Affairs Karen Longaric called the study "lacking in scientific and academic value". It has also been noted, by political scientist and electoral analyst Rodrigo Salazar Elena, that, except for a few details, the two linked CEPR studies are replicas of the same analysis and that lack of statistical knowledge led commentators to be guided by the prestige of MIT and Washington Post and take the conclusions of the CEPR for granted.

On 10 March 2020, Irfan Nooruddin, Professor in the School of Foreign Service at Georgetown University and author of Elections in Hard Times: Building Stronger Democracies in the 21st Century, wrote a Washington Post article to defend the analysis he performed as the head of the OAS statistical study included in their audit. In it, he criticises the 27 February CEPR report by questioning the plausibility of their extrapolation, as well as their assumption that there was no discontinuity in the data beyond the point where the preliminary count was halted. Nooruddin states that at the point where 95% of votes were counted, Morales's vote share began to rise more quickly than it had previously, which is consistent across all six departments reporting at that point. These findings, he says, are consistent with the rest of the findings in the OAS report. He also notes that they are consistent with a separate analysis conducted by Diego Escobari, Associate Professor at University of Texas Rio Grande Valley, and Gary A. Hoover, Head of Economics at University of Oklahoma. CEPR also said that the results of this study were in error.

On 12 March 2020, Professor Rodrigo Salazar Elena, researcher at the Latin American Faculty of Social Sciences in Mexico, wrote an article in Voz y Voto magazine in which he compares and discusses the claims and evidence shown in the OAS and two CEPR studies. He defends the OAS audit by stating that the "duly justified" statistical analysis rests on the "continuity assumption": even with different voting groups, change in vote trend should not exhibit large discontinuities around a single point in time. He states that in order to rebut the OAS analysis and account for the increase in Morales's vote share, it would be necessary to identify a feature distinguishing voters on either side of the threshold. He does not dispute CEPR's method, but notes that it rests on the assumption that voting patterns are geographically contiguous "despite the fact that they are different in terms of reporting the votes to TREP". He offers two potential objections to this assumption. First, he says that geographic contiguity is less plausible than the "continuity assumption" made by the OAS. Secondly, he says that the patterns of stations voting before and after the TREP cutoff are not due to chance.

In June 2020, The New York Times reported on a study by independent researchers Francisco Rodríguez (Tulane University), Dorothy Kronick and Nicolás Idrobo (University of Pennsylvania) which said that the OAS's statistical analysis was flawed, and that the OAS likely used a dataset that incorrectly excluded 1,500 late-reporting voting stations. With these stations included, there was no sudden change in the voting trend, contrary to the OAS's finding. The authors also stated that the OAS used a statistical method that improperly created the appearance of a break in the voting trend where none existed. The researchers' study was published in the Journal of Politics in 2022. Reached for comment by The New York Times, Irfan Nooruddin, who conducted the OAS's statistical analysis, said that Rodríguez and colleagues' study was wrong and did not accurately represent his work. Nooruddin later responded in a comment that the OAS audit included the 1,511 polling stations in all the analyses conducted and that changing the statistical method to the one advocated by the researchers doesn't change the finding. Nooruddin published software to replicate the results found in the OAS audit. The authors note that they "do not assess the integrity of the election overall.. the OAS presented many qualitative indicators of electoral malpractice". The head of electoral observations for the OAS, Gerardo De Icaza, called the conclusions of the study "a moot point", saying that proving or disproving electoral fraud with statistics alone is impossible, a sentiment echoed by Nooruddin in his own article. Calla Hummel, a Bolivia expert at the University of Miami also commenting in the NYT article stated: "There was fraud — we just don't know where and how much".

In August 2020, after Nooruddin published the dataset he used for his audit to a Harvard University digital repository, CEPR reported that they had found a "fatal flaw" in the data which "negat(ed) the OAS's claims that fraud affected the results". They noted that timestamps for the tally sheets recorded in the dataset were formatted as alphanumeric strings, rather than in a purely numeric format: therefore, when they were sorted using this variable, they would have been sorted alphabetically, rather than chronologically, so that tally sheets which had been timestamped with a time of 1:00 pm would be earlier in the order than those timestamped at 1:01 am on the same date, despite the latter having been timestamped nearly twelve hours earlier. The CEPR's David Rosnick argued that "the OAS had no real-world chronology of Bolivia's vote count, even though it made accusations that there was a change in the trend of the votes over time that suggested fraud".

On 25 August 2020, Nooruddin acknowledged the timestamp sorting error identified by the CEPR resulted in "figures where the x-axis is generated using this variable were incorrect," but stated that the mistake "does not affect any of the results or conclusions reported in the original OAS report." Nooruddin updated a comment explaining the statistical analysis correcting the timestamp sorting mistake and updating the statistical estimator to a local linear regression as argued for by Idrobo, Kronick and Rodríguez.

In October 2020, the Bolivian government presented the results of a police investigation into electoral fraud during the election, alleging that former minister of the presidency Juan Ramón Quintana set up a "war room" to plan electoral fraud together with a number of members of the electoral bodies. The investigation also alleged that a number of foreign individuals, some linked to Mexico's Labor Party, an ally of the governing National Regeneration Movement, were involved in the meeting .

The same month, the Bolivian prosecutors office also released a report corroborating 16 pieces of evidence indicating willful manipulation of the election results. This included redirection of server traffic to a network outside the control of the TSE, falsified tally sheets, burned voter index lists, poor chain of custody not guaranteeing that the material had not been tampered with and modification of data from a number of polling stations. These incidents and more led to the OAS concluding that they could not endorse the results of the elections.

In December 2020, CEPR released another response to the concerns raised by the OAS, writing that "when within-locality variation is taken into account, the election results stand up to scrutiny".

== Aftermath ==
New elections were set to be rerun in May 2020, but were postponed due to the COVID-19 pandemic. In June 2020, Áñez stated that she would approve a law passed by both the Chamber of Deputies and the Senate to set a date for the election for 6 September 2020. However, she subsequently refused to sign it, insisting she needed to see an epidemiological study that justified having elections in September. On 23 July 2020, the TSE announced that the election would be postponed to 18 October 2020, due to medical reports that the pandemic would have its highest peaks in late August and early September. The 2020 Bolivian general election was indeed held on that date, resulting in a first-round win by MAS candidate Luis Arce, former minister of economy and public finance and ally of Evo Morales. In the election, which took place under the surveillance of OAS and other international organizations, MAS received 55% of the votes with a margin of 26% over the second party.
