= José Luis Parada =

Bolivian politician

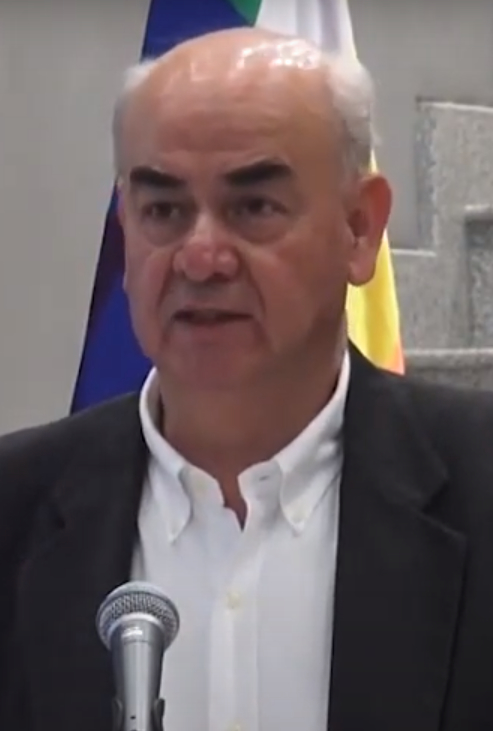

Minister of Economy and Public Finance
- In office 13 November 2019 – 7 July 2020
- President: Jeanine Áñez
- Preceded by: Luis Arce
- Succeeded by: Óscar Ortiz Antelo

Personal details
- Born: José Luis Parada Rivero; 28 September 1953 (age 71); Santa Cruz, Bolivia
- Political party: Juntos
- Education: National Autonomous University of Honduras

José Luis Parada Rivero (born 28 September 1953) is a Bolivian economist and politician who served as the Bolivian Minister of Economy and Public Finance from 13 November 2019 to 7 July 2020 during the interim government of Jeanine Áñez.

== Biography ==
José Luis Parada Rivero was born on 28 September 1953 in Santa Cruz, Bolivia. He studied economics at the National Autonomous University of Honduras in Tegucigalpa graduating as an economist in 1975.

He returned to Bolivia and joined the Santa Cruz Development Corporation as Head of Sector Planning and Director of Administration and Finance. He also entered the public sphere, working as Administrative and Financial Director for the Vice Presidency of Bolivia.

Starting in 2005, Parada served as Secretary of the Economy and Finance of the Departmental Government of Santa Cruz and later as an economic advisor during the administration of Governor Rubén Costas.

== Minister of Economy and Public Finance (2019–2020) ==
On 13 November 2019, President Jeanine Áñez appointed Parada to the position of Minister of Economy and Public Finance in replacement of Luis Arce who resigned on 10 November. He served in the position until 7 July 2020 when he renounced for personal reasons.

Political offices
| Preceded by Luis Arce | Minister of Economy and Finance; 2019–2020 | Succeeded by Oscar Ortiz Antelo |
