= Shirley Franco =

Bolivian politician (born 1987)

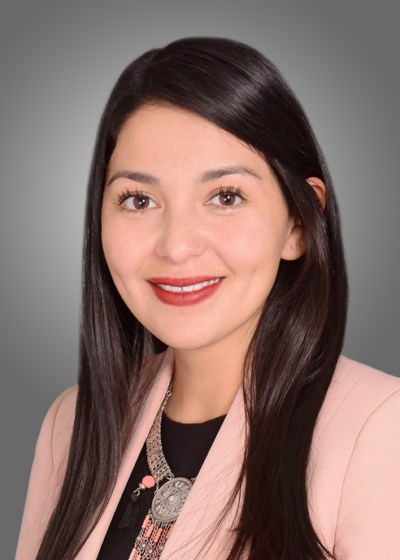
- Official portrait, 2018

Member of the Chamber of Deputies from Cochabamba
- In office 18 January 2015 – 3 November 2020
- Substitute: Enrique Siles
- Preceded by: Mauricio Muñoz
- Succeeded by: Saúl Lara
- Constituency: Party list

Personal details
- Born: Shirley Franco Rodríguez; 4 June 1987 (age 39) Cochabamba, Bolivia
- Party: Social Democratic Movement (2019–present)
- Other political affiliations: National Unity Front (2009–2019)
- Education: Higher University of San Simón
- Occupation: Political scientist; politician

Shirley Franco Rodríguez (Spanish: [ʃiɾˈlej]; born 4 June 1987) is a Bolivian political scientist and politician who served as a party-list member of the Chamber of Deputies from Cochabamba from 2015 to 2020. She previously served on the Cochabamba Municipal Council from 2010 to 2014.

Raised in the social conflicts of the early to mid-2000s, Franco entered politics within a year of graduating from university. She joined the National Unity Front in 2009, with which she unsuccessfully contested a seat in the Chamber of Deputies. Undeterred, Franco saw better results in the following year's local elections, winning a seat on the Cochabamba Municipal Council.

In 2014, Franco returned to national politics and was elected to represent the Democratic Unity coalition in the Chamber of Deputies, becoming one of the youngest parliamentarians in the legislature. Amid the fragmentation of the opposition caucus in the Legislative Assembly, Franco defected from National Unity and joined the Social Democratic Movement, which in 2019 nominated her to accompany Oscar Ortiz as his running mate. Having failed in her bid for the vice presidency, Franco sought reelection in the snap 2020 general election, but her candidacy was annulled in conjunction with her party's withdrawal from the race. Though considered a possible contender for the Cochabamba mayoralty, Franco declined to run.

== Early life and political career ==
Shirley Franco was born on 4 June 1987, the third of four children born to Raúl Franco and Libertad Rodríguez, brothers Guido Franco, Esteban Franco, and sister Estefani Franco, a middle-class family from Cochabamba. She completed her primary and secondary schooling at the city's American Institute before going on the attend the Higher University of San Simón, where she graduated with a bachelor's in political science in 2008. In the ensuing years, Franco completed postgraduate studies at the University of Valle and the University of Salamanca, receiving two postgraduate degrees in the fields of governance and political management and municipal public policy and social cohesion. Additionally, she completed courses in political transformation at the International Institute for Democracy and Electoral Assistance.

Franco belongs to a generation of urban activists who entered politics in opposition to the ruling Movement for Socialism. In the polarized climate of the late 2000s—a period characterized by political restructuring following the collapse of the establishment political parties—figures like Franco became protagonists of popular anti-government mobilizations, especially in deeply divided Cochabamba, where social unrest reached its peak in 2007. As new opposition parties developed, many incorporated these urban youth and women's movements into their ranks.

For her part, Franco's liberal and social democratic inclinations led her to join the National Unity Front (UN), which in 2009 nominated her to represent Cochabamba's circumscription 23 as a substitute member of the Chamber of Deputies. Though unsuccessful in that bid, she remained involved with the party and was elected to represent it in the Cochabamba Municipal Council the following year. Aged 22 at the time of her inauguration, Franco went on to serve as a municipal councillor for a further four years before resigning in 2014 to make a second attempt at national politics.

== Chamber of Deputies ==
=== Election ===
With the campaign underway for the 2014 general election, Franco was nominated to contest a seat in the Chamber of Deputies on behalf of the Democratic Unity (UD) coalition, an alliance between UN and the Social Democratic Movement (MDS). She topped UD's electoral list in the Cochabamba Department and was elected to hold the position, becoming one of the youngest members of an opposition caucus characterized by its high number of young female legislators.

=== Tenure ===
Franco presented three major bills throughout her parliamentary tenure, including two health-related ones, one directed at increasing government attention on persons with diabetes and one focused on procuring new treatments for cervical cancer. However, her most notable proposal came in 2016, when she presented a bill that would penalize street harassment with up to eight hours in police custody and a fine of Bs 500. Franco had been a vocal critic of Bolivia's Law N° 348, which ostensibly guarantees women's civil and political rights, arguing that beyond a lack of public resources for enforcement, the legislation also failed to address major women's issues. In particular, she stated that cultural change needed to be legislated so as to prevent verbal harassment and cat-calling, close the gender wage gap, increase female access and permanence in education, and ensure that both boys and girls are taught the same skills. Franco's bill regulating street harassment went on to be included as part of the government's 2017 reforms to the Penal Code, but the entire legislation was ultimately abrogated due to protests over unrelated sections. Nonetheless, Franco later expressed satisfaction for having, at the very least, opened a national debate on the subject.

Despite entering parliament as a partisan of UN, Franco also fostered relationships with UD's other primary component, the MDS, and, according to Deputy Jimena Costa, she was observed to have participated in the party's internal meetings from her first day in office. The relationship between UN and the MDS "ended the first day they (the legislators) took their seats in 2015," and much of Franco's work had to contend with the unruly and disorderly caucus these internal divisions created. Nearing the conclusion of her term, with the 2019 general election on the horizon, these issues became more pronounced as UN and the MDS split over who would head the alliance's presidential ticket. Ultimately, the MDS's Oscar Ortiz was presented as the newly-constituted Bolivia Says No (BDN) alliance's presidential candidate, while UN leader Samuel Doria Medina announced his party's withdrawal from the contest all together. This decision, Franco contended, was not discussed in conjunction with UN's incumbent parliamentarians, a fact that led her to formally defect from the party.

In early 2019, during UD's annual internal leadership election, Franco presented her candidacy to head the caucus, challenging UN's pre-selected candidate, María Eugenia Calcina. In a controversial session, Franco was elected with the supporting votes of the MDS, solidifying her break with UN. Franco's rapprochement with the MDS proved self-beneficial when, in July, Ortiz's running mate, Edwin Rodríguez, abruptly dropped out of the race, citing a possible dispersion of the vote in favor of the ruling party. As BDN scrambled to select a new vice-presidential candidate, Franco's name was profiled as among the top contenders. After narrowing the list of potential running mates down to three finalist candidates, Franco was selected to accompany Ortiz on BDN's ticket. Ultimately, however, Franco's youthful appeal failed to significantly bolster BDN's electoral chances, and the alliance finished fourth on election day.

Faced with a disastrous four percent finish at the polls, the MDS's prospects quickly rebounded as allegations of electoral fraud provoked the collapse of the Evo Morales administration and the accession of MDS Senator Jeanine Áñez to the presidency. With Áñez at the helm, the party re-launched its campaign for the 2020 general election. In Cochabamba, the MDS nominated Franco to seek a second term in the Chamber of Deputies. However, her candidacy was annulled along with those of the party's entire parliamentary ticket following Áñez's decision to withdraw from the race. Shortly after the conclusion of her term, Franco was put forward as the MDS's Cochabamba mayoral candidate, but she declined to run, citing an "extreme dispersion" of the vote in favor of the ruling party.

=== Commission assignments ===
- Planning, Economic Policy, and Finance Commission
  - Science and Technology Committee (2015–2017)
- Territorial Organization of the State and Autonomies Commission
  - Departmental Autonomies Committee (2017–2018)
- Plural Economy, Production, and Industry Commission
  - Agriculture and Animal Husbandry Committee (2018–2019)
- Constitution, Legislation, and Electoral System Commission
  - Democracy and Electoral System Committee (2019–2020)

== Electoral history ==
Electoral history of Shirley Franco
Year	Office	Party	Alliance	Votes			Result	Ref.
Year	Office	Party	Alliance	Total	%	P.	Result	Ref.
2009	Sub. Deputy	National Unity Front	Consensus and National Unity	7,472	8.69%	3rd	Lost	
2010	Councillor	National Unity Front	All for Cochabamba	108,630	39.47%	1st	Won	(Note: Presented on an electoral list. The data shown represents the share of the vote the entire party/alliance received in that constituency.)
2014	Deputy	National Unity Front	Democratic Unity	186,346	19.50%	2nd	Won	
2019	Vice president	Social Democratic Movement	Bolivia Says No	260,316	4.24%	4th	Annulled	
2020	Deputy	Social Democratic Movement	Juntos	Withdrew			Lost	
Source: Plurinational Electoral Organ | Electoral Atlas

Chamber of Deputies of Bolivia
Preceded by Mauricio Muñoz	Member of the Chamber of Deputies from Cochabamba; 2015–2020	Succeeded by Saúl Lara
Party political offices
Preceded by Gonzalo Barrientos	Leader of the Chamber of Deputies; Democratic Unity Caucus; 2019–2020	Caucus dissolved
Preceded by Ernesto Suárez	Social Democratic Movement nominee for Vice President of Bolivia; 2019	Succeeded by Samuel Doria Medina; Withdrew
