= KNDS (disambiguation) =

KNDS is a European manufacturer of military land systems.

It may also refer to:

- KNDS-LP, American radio station in Fargo, North Dakota
- Kerr–Newman–de–Sitter metric, a solution of the Einstein–Maxwell equations
- Khandeshwar railway station, Mumbai (Indian Railways station code: KNDS)

== See also ==
- KND (disambiguation)
