= Oscar Ortiz (Bolivian politician) =

Bolivian politician (born 1969)

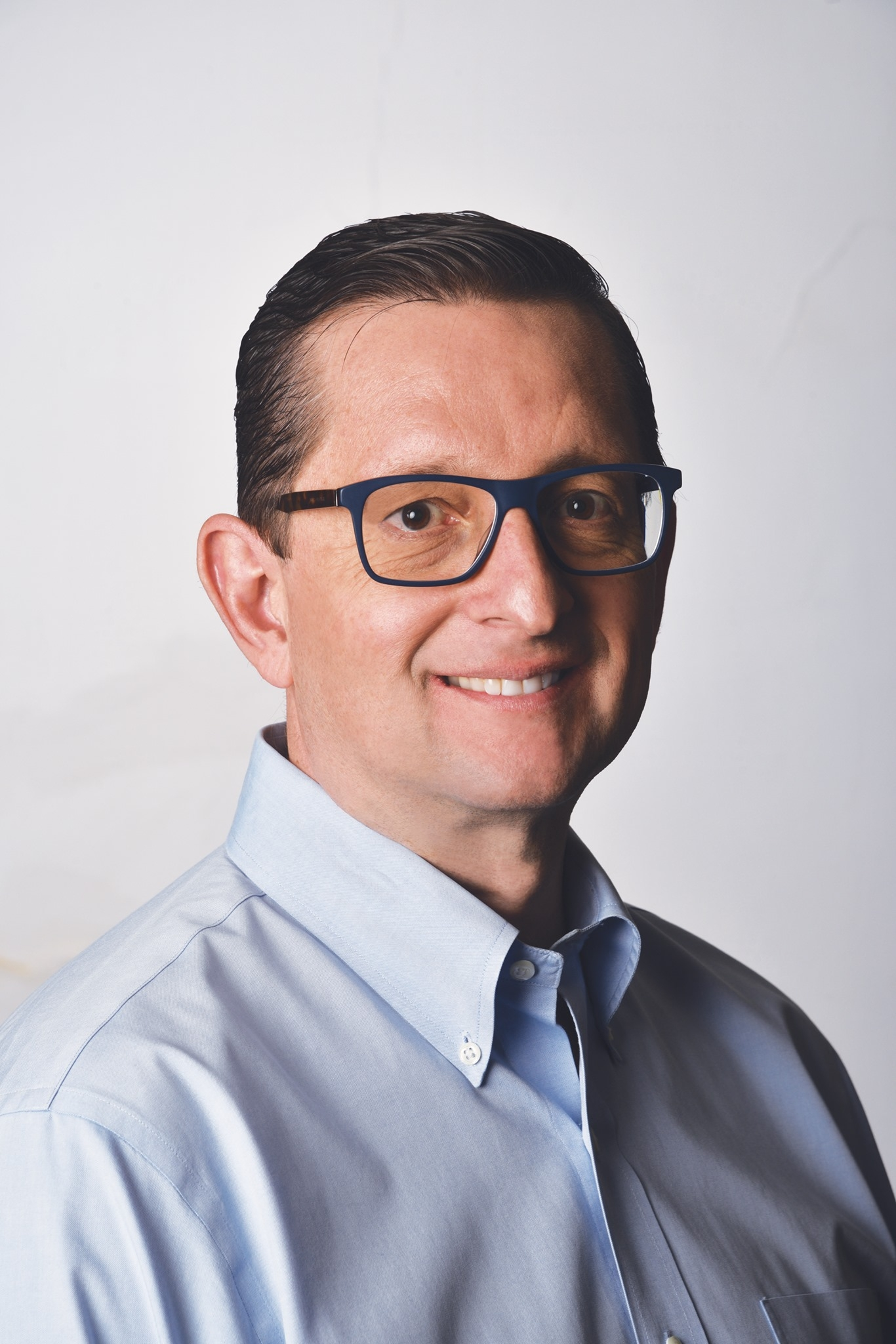

Minister of Economy and Public Finance
- In office 7 July 2020 – 28 September 2020
- President: Jeanine Áñez
- Preceded by: José Luis Parada
- Succeeded by: Branko Marinković

Minister of Productive Development and the Plural Economy
- In office 8 May 2020 – 7 July 2020
- President: Jeanine Áñez
- Preceded by: Wilfredo Rojo
- Succeeded by: Abel Martínez

President of the Senate
- In office 18 January 2008 – 19 January 2010
- Preceded by: José Villavicencio
- Succeeded by: Ana María Romero

Senator for Santa Cruz
- In office 18 January 2015 – 8 May 2020
- Substitute: María Lourdes Landívar
- Preceded by: Félix Martínez
- Succeeded by: María Lourdes Landívar
- In office 19 January 2006 – 19 January 2010
- Substitute: María Silvia Baldomar
- Preceded by: Guillermo Justiniano
- Succeeded by: Germán Antelo

Personal details
- Born: Oscar Miguel Ortiz Antelo; 28 September 1969 (age 57) Santa Cruz de la Sierra, Bolivia
- Party: Social Democratic Movement (2013–2020)
- Other political affiliations: Popular Consensus (2009–2013)
- Education: Private University of Santa Cruz de la Sierra (BBA; MBL)
- Occupation: Businessman; politician
- Website: oscarortiz.com.bo

Oscar Miguel Ortiz Antelo (born 28 September 1969) is a Bolivian businessman and politician who served as minister of economy and public finance from July to September 2020 and as minister of productive development from May to July 2020. As a member of the Social Democratic Movement, he previously served two terms as a senator for Santa Cruz from 2015 to 2020 on behalf of the Democratic Unity coalition and from 2006 to 2010 on behalf of the Social Democratic Power alliance. Nearing the end of his second term, Ortiz was his party's presidential candidate, attaining fourth place in the annulled 2019 general elections. During his first term, he served as president of the Senate from 2008 to 2010, the last opposition legislator to preside over the upper chamber as of 2026. Outside of national politics, Ortiz served as president of the Union of Latin American Parties from 2018 to 2021 and has been the rector of the Bolivian Catholic University at Santa Cruz since 2021.

== Early life and career ==
Oscar Ortiz was born on 28 September 1969 in Santa Cruz de la Sierra, the son of a prestigious doctor from a middle-class family. He attended his city's Marist School, later studying at the Private University of Santa Cruz de la Sierra, where he graduated with a bachelor's degree in business administration and a master's in corporate law. Throughout his career, Ortiz held numerous administrative positions in the institutions most relevant to Santa Cruz's business community. Between 1991 and 2005, he served as an executive and later general manager of the Chamber of Industry and Commerce, and sat on the boards of the Business Development Foundation, the Federation of Private Entrepreneurs, and the Santa Cruz Exhibition Fair, among others.

During the democratic administration of Hugo Banzer, between 1997 and 1999, Ortiz served as a senior advisor to the Ministry of Foreign Trade and as general counsel for the Ministry of Housing. Around this time, he developed political links with Vice President Jorge Quiroga, and though he was never a member of the governing party, he promoted a change in leadership within Nationalist Democratic Action through the adhesion of young, professional, and liberal-minded figures to its ranks.

== Chamber of Senators ==
=== First term (2006–2010) ===
==== 2005 general election ====
Significant social conflicts at the turn of the twentieth century fostered a change in political action in Santa Cruz. Emulating the tactic of mass mobilization utilized by the country's indigenous and unionist sectors to achieve their goals, Cruceños took to the streets demanding expanded departmental autonomy. By 2004, Ortiz's early support for the decentralization process had led him to gain regional notoriety. When Quiroga contested the presidency in 2005, Ortiz was invited to join the former vice president's Social Democratic Power (PODEMOS) alliance as its candidate for senator. The election presented mixed results for the conservative coalition. While Evo Morales of the Movement for Socialism (MAS-IPSP) won the presidency, PODEMOS won the most Senate seats.

==== Tenure ====
The control exercised by the opposition over the upper chamber constituted the main counterweight to Morales's ability to legislate during his first term. Though the MAS defeated Ortiz to win the presidency of the Senate in 2006—owing to the votes of the two senators from National Unity (UN) and the Revolutionary Nationalist Movement (MNR)—it was unable to repeat that victory in ensuing years. In 2007, neither the MAS nor PODEMOS won control of the Senate, with Senator José Villavicencio of UN being elected to preside over the body. By 2008, however, both the MNR and UN opted to lend their support to PODEMOS, which put forward Ortiz to hold the position, beating out the more conciliatory Carlos Böhrt for the nomination. The promotion of Ortiz as head of the upper chamber was a considerable setback for the ruling party as, compared to his more centrist predecessor, Ortiz aligned himself with more right-wing sects of the opposition. Attempts by the MAS to dislodge Ortiz from the presidency the following year also failed, with his bid for reelection counting the support of most of the opposition and even two ruling party defectors.

Throughout Ortiz's term, the Senate found itself primarily preoccupied with the ongoing process of entirely reforming the nation's Constitution, a project spearheaded by Morales. Just over a month after assuming office, in March 2006, Ortiz voted in favor of sanctioning the convocation of a Constituent Assembly charged with drafting a new constitution, a decision approved unanimously by both the MAS and opposition. Inaugurated in Sucre on 6 August, the Constituent Assembly was tasked with completing its work within a year but quickly found itself bogged down by disputes over which sections of the text necessitated two-thirds majority approval. On 3 August 2007, three days before its initially prescribed mandate expired, the Senate's four caucuses agreed to extend the Assembly's term to 14 December. Ortiz initially supported the decision, believing that the agreement consolidated the threshold of two-thirds for the approval of the document's final text. Three months later, however, amid mass protests in Sucre, the MAS majority in the assembly opted to reconvene itself in Oruro, where the final draft was approved in a marathon session boycotted by PODEMOS. The circumstances of its passage led Ortiz to later state that the new constitution "never had legitimacy."

In 2008, seeking to bolster his mandate amid continued unrest, Morales sought the support of Congress for the approval of a recall referendum against himself and the nine departmental prefects. At internal meetings regarding the topic, the majority of the PODEMOS caucus opted to support the referendum as a means of blocking the pending enactment of the new constitution. Though Ortiz personally opposed the decision, as president of the Senate, he chose not to use his power to block the plebiscite's convocation. Ultimately, Morales survived the vote with the support of sixty-seven percent of the population, while the opposition suffered the loss of two of its prefects in Cochabamba and La Paz.

Following its inability to remove Morales from office, the opposition reinitiated negotiations with the government. In October, the MAS and PODEMOS reached an agreement in which the opposition-controlled Senate would approve the call for a referendum to ratify the new constitution. In exchange, the MAS conceded to the modification of over a hundred articles in the draft document and the convocation of new general elections ahead of schedule, with Morales pledging not to seek reelection after 2009. Ortiz opposed the agreement, leading a group of around thirty parliamentarians who voted against the referendum.

==== 2009 general election ====
Ortiz's opposition to the new constitution led to his estrangement from Quiroga and PODEMOS, which suffered an internal implosion around this time. In March 2009, the still-president of the Senate announced his defection from the alliance, taking eleven of its Santa Cruz parliamentarians with him and establishing Popular Consensus (CP), a regional civic group led by himself that sought to contest that year's general elections. Following the presentation of the new party, senators from both the MAS and PODEMOS called on Ortiz to resign as president of the Senate, arguing that he no longer belonged to any of the upper chamber's recognized caucuses. Ortiz refused, maintaining administrative control of the Senate for the duration of his term.

In August 2009, CP and UN agreed to establish an electoral coalition, forming the Alliance for Consensus and National Unity (UN-CP). The group nominated UN's Samuel Doria Medina for the presidency, with Ortiz seeking reelection as UN-CP's candidate for senator. By the end of the campaign, the alliance failed to attain significant support, exiting third on election day with five percent of the vote, a margin insufficient to keep Ortiz in office for a second term.

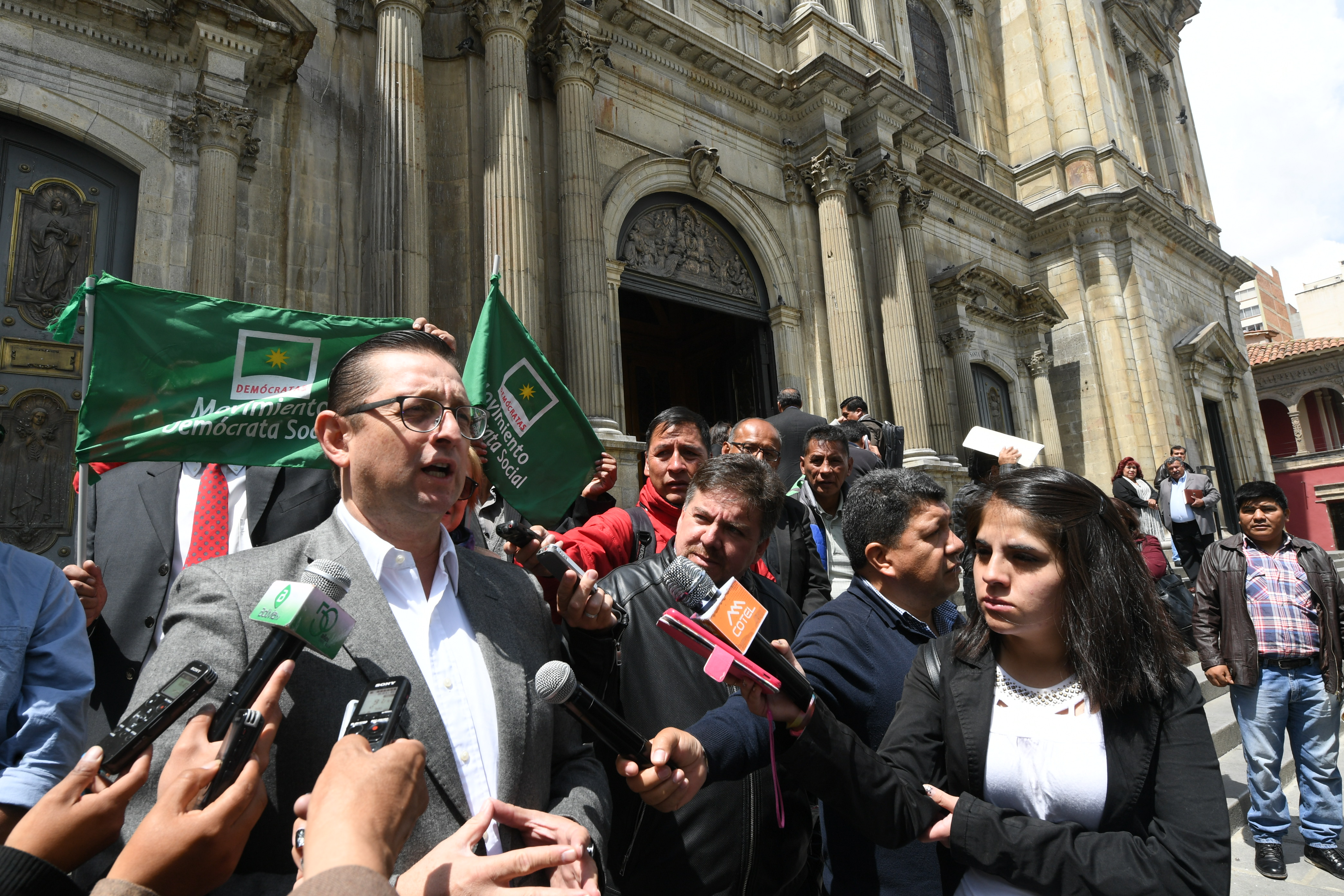
Ortiz served as secretary-general of the Social Democratic Movement.

=== Between terms ===
During the 2010 regional elections, Ortiz supported the gubernatorial candidacy of Santa Cruz Prefect Rubén Costas, aligning CP with Costas's Truth and Social Democracy (VERDES). Shortly after assuming office, Costas appointed Ortiz to his cabinet as head of the newly established Secretariat of Institutional Coordination and Autonomous Development. While in the Costas administration, Ortiz assisted the governor in formulating the Social Democratic Movement (MDS), a political project that sought to unite the disparate parties of the Media Luna region into a single national opposition front capable of challenging the MAS. More than thirteen groups made up the movement, including Ortiz's CP, Costas's VERDES, and Savina Cuéllar's Liberty and Renovating Democracy (LÍDER). In May 2013, the three main organizations presented a merger request to the Supreme Electoral Tribunal (TSE), which rejected it on the grounds that the law only allowed political parties to be fused, not civic groups. To circumvent this, Ortiz's party requested authorization from the TSE to legally change its name from Popular Consensus to Social Democratic Movement, which was accepted. The decision gave rise to the MDS's formal establishment four months later at a Founding Congress in which Ortiz was elected as the party's secretary-general.

=== Second term (2015–2020) ===
==== 2014 general election ====
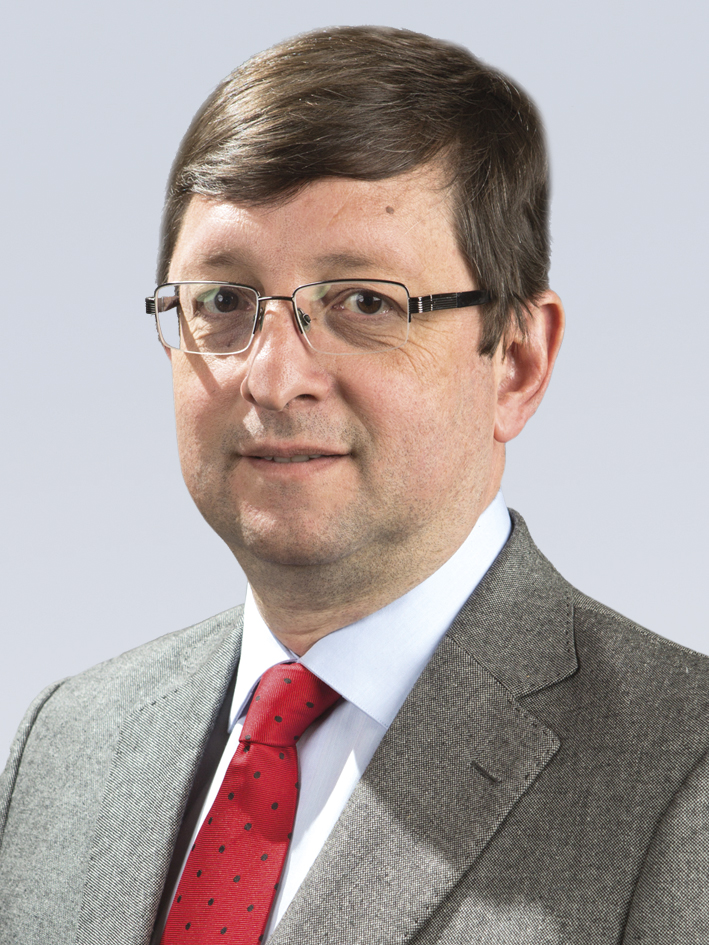
Official portrait, 2018

For the 2014 electoral campaign, the MDS aligned itself with UN, forming the Democratic Unity (UD) coalition to combat the MAS as a single front. As part of its strategy of nominating former parliamentarians and politically experienced professionals to guarantee a high degree of representation in the legislature, UD selected Ortiz as its candidate for senator. The coalition attained a distant second place at the polls, returning Ortiz to the Senate to complete a non-consecutive second term.

==== Tenure ====
Ortiz's tenure as a member of the opposition focused its efforts on investigating and denouncing acts of corruption within the government. Between 2015 and 2016, in his capacity as president of the Rural Native Indigenous Peoples and Nations Commission, Ortiz conducted an audit of the country's Indigenous Fund. In 2017, he presented Chronicle of a Betrayal, a 400-page report alleging rampant embezzlement and financial mismanagement within the organization. Ortiz's investigation found that of 1,110 projects commissioned to provide Bs 730 million worth of aid to the indigenous population, only 107 were executed to completion, and over half had irregularities. Additionally, some Bs 692 million destined for 1,048 projects were redirected into private accounts, with the rate of these acts increasing in periods preceding elections, leading Ortiz to conclude that the ruling party had used aid money to finance its electoral campaigns. According to the senator, the combined economic damage done to the State amounted to almost Bs 700 million, though estimates by the government comptroller placed the financial loss at a little over Bs 100 million. "The main victims of this scandal were the indigenous peoples who saw their cause delegitimized [and] their organizations prostituted", Ortiz stated in a later op-ed published by Página Siete.

===== 2019 presidential campaign =====
As its secretary-general, Ortiz sought to position the MDS as a national political party with a view toward the 2019 general elections. For Ortiz, the prospect of not participating in the election was out of the question, with internal discussions on whether the party would go it alone or form an alliance taking place long before the start of the campaign. Should the MDS have competed on its own, the nomination of its leader, Costas, was a "natural" choice, with Ortiz profiled as a possible vice-presidential candidate. During negotiations with the Revolutionary Left Front (FRI)—which nominated former president Carlos Mesa—the MDS conditioned an alliance on the inclusion of Ortiz on the ticket as Mesa's running mate. The FRI rejected this option as Mesa preferred to choose his own companion, frustrating negotiations.

Logo of Bolivia Says No

Ultimately, the MDS settled on allying with UN, its longtime partner, effectively continuing the previous UD coalition under a new name. The alliance, dubbed Bolivia Says No (BDN), was sealed on 13 November 2018 and formally launched the following day. Shortly thereafter, BDN began analyzing whether it would nominate a single presidential ticket or if candidates from UN and MDS would separately contest the primary elections scheduled for January 2019. The latter option would have made the alliance one of the only fronts facing a competitive primary. (Note: The 2019 primaries were unique in that each political organization chose which of its members would run in them, ultimately resulting in nine entirely uncontested races.) While Doria Medina was the only presidential candidate profiled by UN, the MDS considered the likes of Costas, Ortiz, and former Beni governor Ernesto Suárez, with the latter two also seen as "ideal" running mates. By 27 November, BDN had settled on a compromise, nominating Doria Medina for the presidency with Ortiz seeking the vice-presidency. However, within hours of the scheduled announcement, Doria Medina publicized his and his party's decision to withdraw from the alliance, instead choosing to sit out the 2019 election cycle.

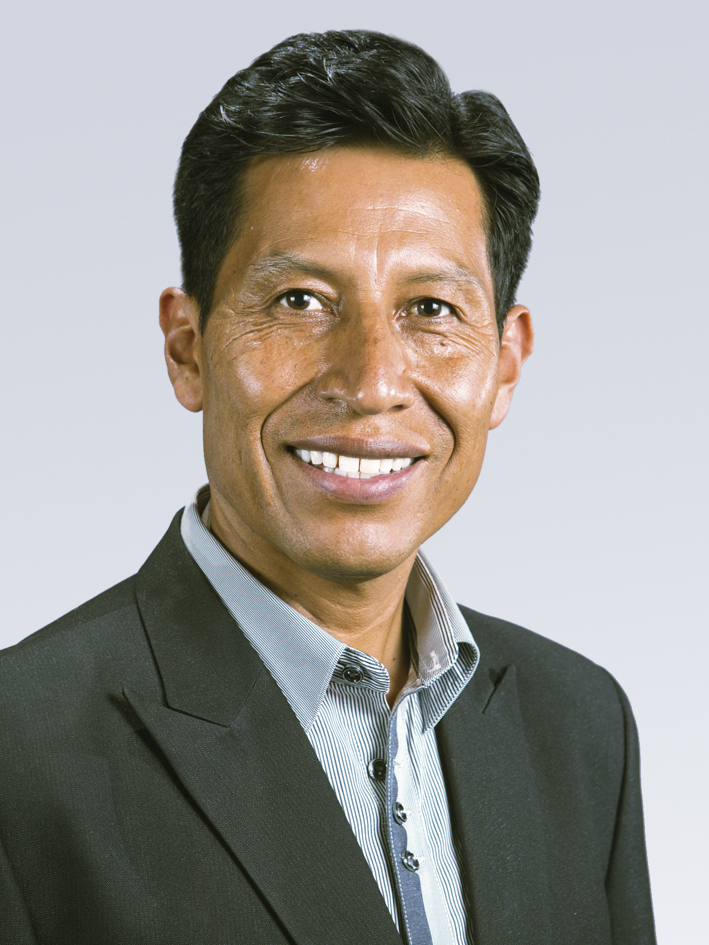
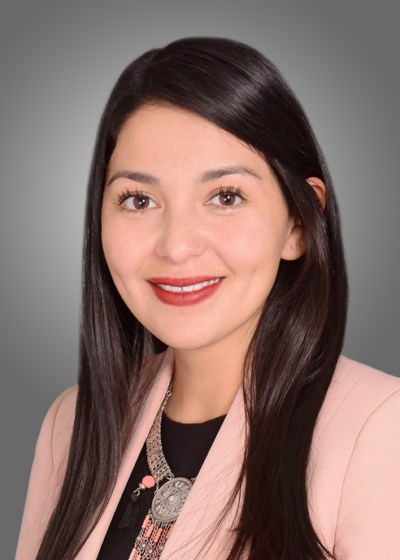
From left to right: Edwin Rodríguez and Shirley Franco

Two days after the rupture of the BDN alliance, the MDS presented Oscar Ortiz as its presidential candidate, with Senator Edwin Rodríguez of Potosí as his running mate. Their campaign was officially launched on 2 January 2019, the first working day of the year. Ortiz outlined his intention to tour the entire country, conducting meetings with differing sectors of the population to present BDN's platform and hear the needs of the citizenry. Throughout the campaign, Ortiz maintained a steady third place in opinion polling, hovering at around six to eight percent of the vote. Ortiz's low likelihood of attaining enough support to challenge Morales in an eventual runoff led many critics to call on him to drop out of the race in order to avoid a split in the opposition vote. (Note: In Bolivia, a second round is avoided by one candidate either reaching fifty percent of the vote or achieving a forty percent plurality with ten percent more votes than the next closest competitor.) Among those sharing such concerns included Ortiz's own running mate, Rodríguez, who unexpectedly withdrew his candidacy in July while Ortiz was on a campaign visit to Brazil. Nonetheless, Ortiz vehemently refused to remove himself from the race, accusing Rodríguez of having been bought by opposing candidates. A month later, BDN selected Deputy Shirley Franco of Cochabamba to serve as Ortiz's new running mate.

Nearing the end of the campaign, BDN continued to see increasing calls for Ortiz to drop out of the race, even from among internal groups. In October, a multitude of prominent national and regional legislators, including the entirety of the MDS caucus in the Cochabamba Departmental Assembly, withdrew their support from Ortiz, calling on supporters to lend their vote to Mesa. By election day, the final results gave Ortiz little more than four percent of the vote, leaving him in fourth place, having been displaced from third by the unprecedented support attained by evangelical pastor Chi Hyun Chung. Following his loss, Ortiz endorsed Mesa's campaign to confront Morales in an expected second round.

===== Political crisis and transition =====
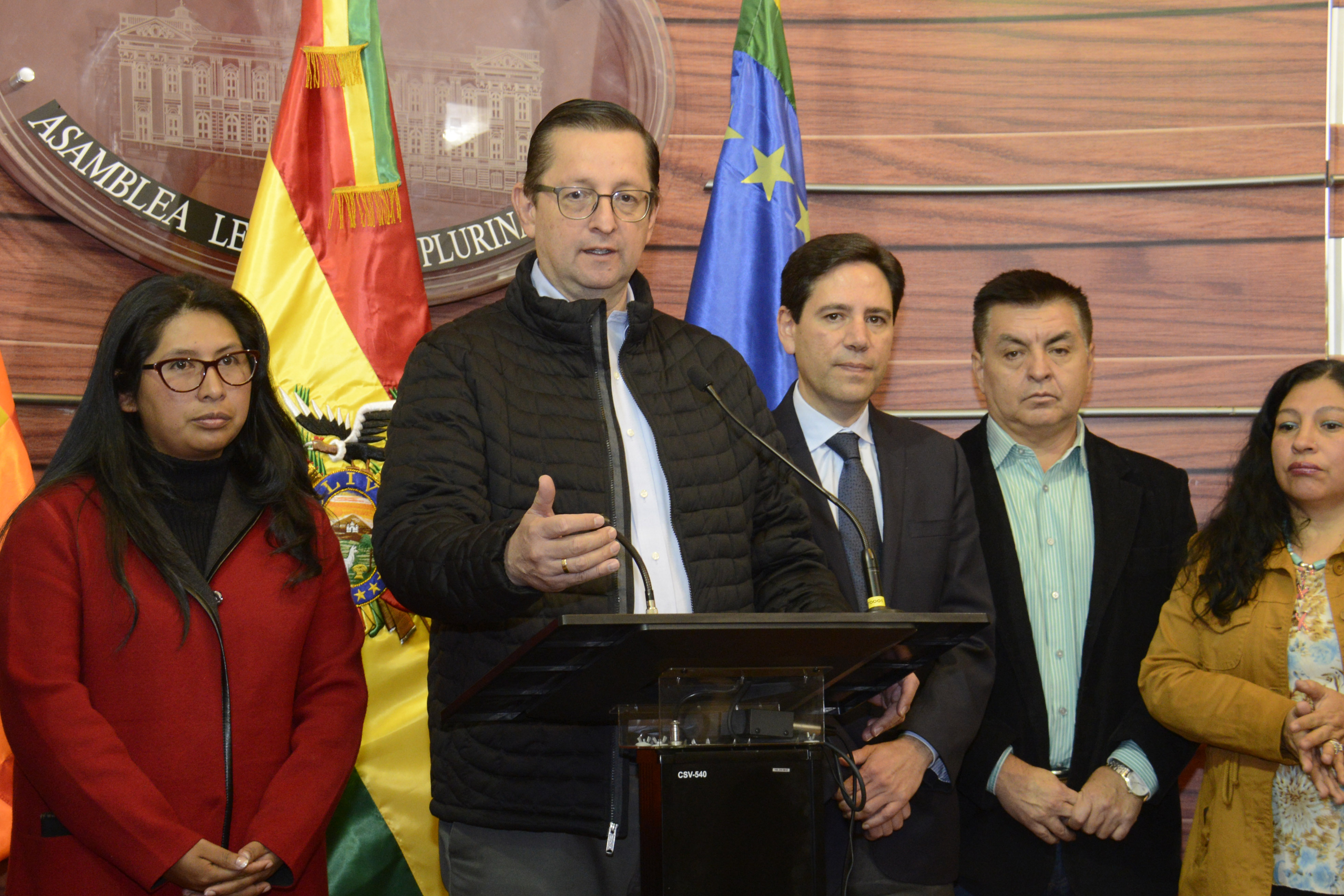
Ortiz at a Senate press conference, 18 December 2019.

No runoff ever occurred. Following the election, widespread allegations of fraud and subsequent mass mobilizations paralyzed the country. After three weeks of protests, continued social unrest culminated in the resignation of Morales from the presidency, opening a vacuum of power in the country. In ensuing days, Ortiz attended a series of meetings sponsored by the Bolivian Episcopal Conference, serving as a representative for the MDS. Per the Church's account, the MAS delegates suggested two means of presidential succession that they found acceptable, both of which were rejected as unconstitutional by the others in attendance. Conversely, both Adriana Salvatierra and Susana Rivero—presidents of the upper and lower chambers, respectively—rejected the option of assuming the presidency themselves, nor did they accept the suggestion that Jeanine Áñez, second vice president of the Senate, succeed Morales. With dialogue quickly proving fruitless, Salvatierra requested a closed-door meeting, attended only by herself, Rivero, and Ortiz, with Monsignor Eugenio Scarpellini present as a mediator. The contents of the discussions were not disclosed, though, after their conclusion, the plenary meeting resumed, with Salvatierra and Rivero agreeing to facilitate Áñez's succession. (Note: The MAS later reneged on this pledge, ostensibly due to the lack of security guarantees. As such, Áñez's succession occurred ipso facto without the presence of MAS legislators.)

With Morales's ouster, the opposition had won control of the executive. However, the new government's ability to conduct the transition remained reliant on the legislature, dominated by a MAS supermajority. As dean of the Senate, Ortiz took charge of reestablishing dialogue with his MAS colleagues, seeking to reach agreements in the legislature with the aim of annulling the previous elections, convoking new ones, appointing new electoral authorities, and extending the government's soon-to-expire mandate. To do this, he initially sought to negotiate the necessary MAS support to be elected president of the Senate. According to Chuquisaca Senator Omar Aguilar, the option of granting Ortiz control over the upper house was supported by Efraín Chambi, head of the MAS caucus in the Senate, who was willing to exchange the position for a ministerial role, granting the MAS a presence in the executive. Aguilar opposed this idea because it would have given Ortiz virtual control over the Legislative Assembly. (Note: The presidency of the Legislative Assembly is a vice-presidential prerogative. Given the resignation of Álvaro García Linera, the vice presidency remained vacant, making the president of the Senate the effective head of the Legislative Assembly.) Ultimately, Ortiz backed down after the MAS threatened to reinstate Salvatierra as president of the Senate, given that she had never formally resigned. With that, MAS Senator Eva Copa was elected to preside over the chamber.

Following the election of its new directorate, the Senate moved to reconfigure its committees and commissions. Ortiz was selected to serve as president of the Constitution Commission, granting him a high degree of control over the process of drafting a bill to call new elections. After a series of intensive negotiations, Ortiz succeeded in reaching an agreement with the MAS's "conciliatory wing", who agreed to pass a law scheduling new elections in which Morales would not be allowed to participate. With that, Ortiz subsequently oversaw the process of designating six new electoral authorities to chair the TSE and was one of the architects of the law extending the terms of the country's elected officials. Ortiz's ability to attain MAS support for these initiatives was due in part to the party's internal divisions and the political inexperience of its legislators. "When the technical groups that would elaborate the laws were formed, [the MAS] realized that they had never worked in that way because all the bills came from the executive and the ruling party only had to approve them", Ortiz stated.

== Minister of Economy ==
Given Áñez's membership in the party, her assumption of office granted the MDS a great deal of influence over the transitional government. In particular, a large part of the Áñez Cabinet was composed of individuals aligned with Ortiz's wing of the MDS. While not initially a minister himself, Ortiz served as a close advisor to the president. Per a report by Opinión, the selection of Oscar Mercado as minister of labor would have been at his suggestion. Additionally, the newly-appointed minister of government, Arturo Murillo, was known to have been Ortiz's "right-hand and political advisor." These factors led El Deber to describe Ortiz as "a vital cog in the new government", stating that his political power had "grown exponentially."

With the onset of the COVID-19 pandemic, the transitional government saw the loss of Wilfredo Rojo, minister of productive development, due to disagreements over the implementation of quarantine measures. In his place, Áñez appointed Ortiz, charging him with the task of reactivating the economy in the face of the health crisis and implementing a previously announced employment plan. To do the latter, the president established the National Reactivation Council, chaired by Ortiz with the presence of seven other ministers. Speaking to media outlets, Ortiz pledged to coordinate economic reactivation with the private and public sectors, including working closely with small businesses and entrepreneurs to alleviate their concerns. Ortiz's newfound influence over the government's economic policy led ERBOL to dub him the "superminister of economic reactivation." However, as noted by El Deber, with Ortiz's entry into the executive, Áñez lost her "best negotiator" and main strategist in the legislature, a move some government officials later admitted "was a mistake". For the duration of the transition, "the [legislature] ... absolutely blocked the executive", leaving Áñez unable to enact her economic, electoral, and health policies.

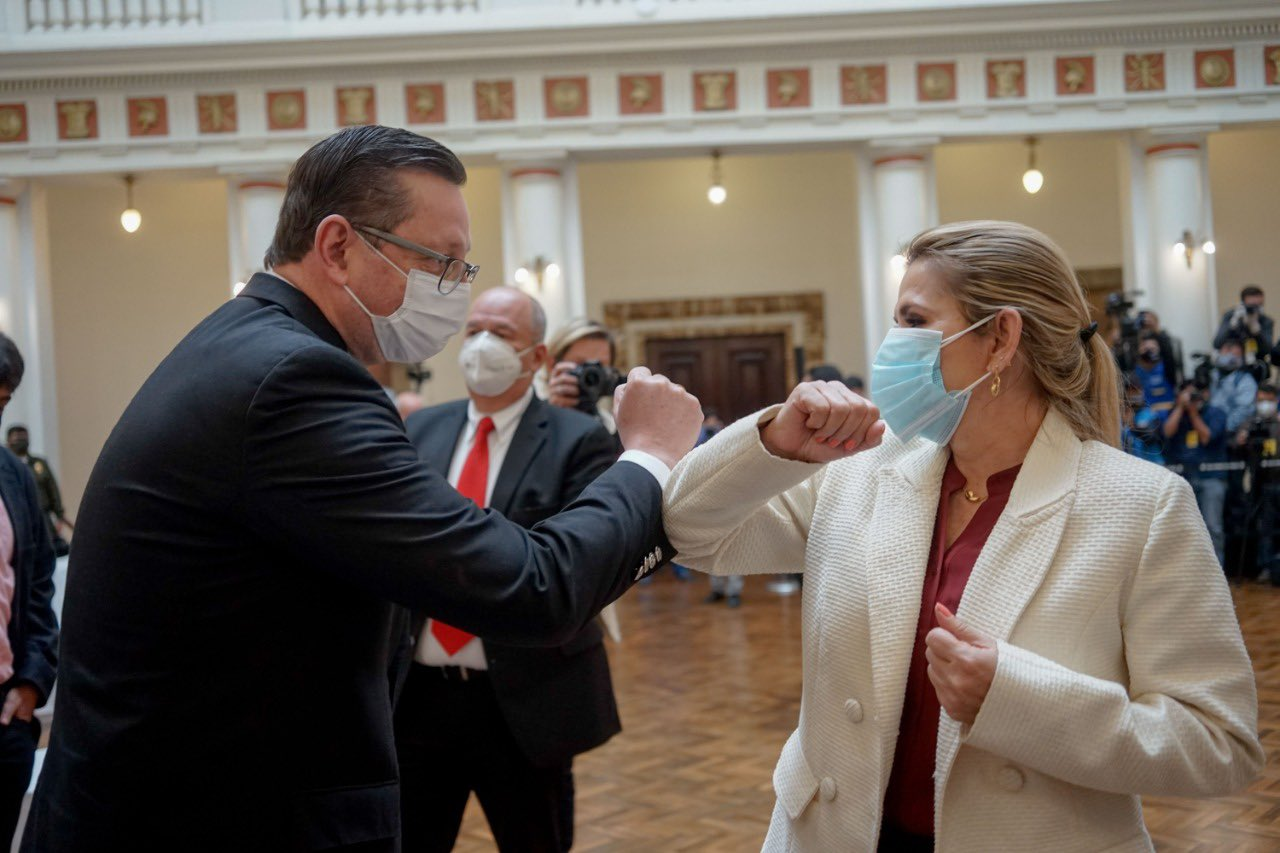
Ortiz is sworn in as minister of economy, 7 July 2020.

In early July, Ortiz was appointed to take the reins of the Ministry of Economy, a position he used to launch the government's economic reactivation plan. The program was based on five pillars: provide working capital to companies and producers; establish new sources of employment; encourage the consumption and purchase of national products; and reduce public spending. For the first and second points, Ortiz outlined that the government would seek to support businesses and agricultural producers through the allocation of credit, while entrepreneurs would be granted tax incentives for their business endeavors. To encourage the consumption of national products, a system was to be implemented favoring national suppliers in state purchases. Adding to this, Ortiz announced that the Central Bank had been directed to inject liquidity to finance national production and tourism projects. In terms of cutting unnecessary costs, Ortiz estimated that the plan would seek to reduce state spending by up to fifteen percent, an idea El País described as "classic austerity measures recommended by IMF (International Monetary Fund) orthodoxy."

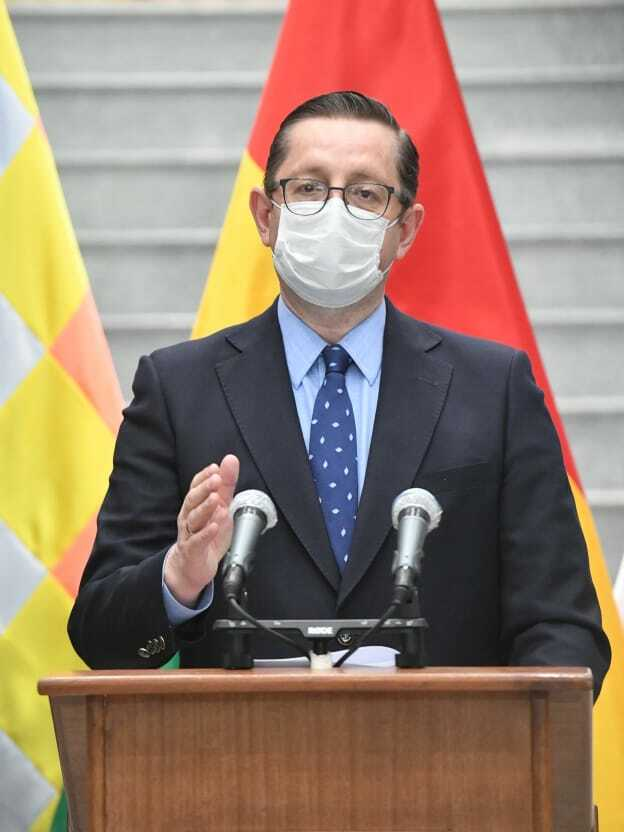
Ortiz discusses the deferral of bank loan payments, 31 August 2020.

While extensive, the plan was criticized by analysts and economists for being too ambitious and taking too long to execute, given that the transitional government was set to conclude its work within mere months. Economist Gonzalo Chávez called it a "long-term plan", requiring at least ten to fifteen years to fully implement. While the program also included short and medium-term elements, financial specialist Jaime Dunn expressed doubt over Ortiz's ability to execute them by the election date. In particular, much of the financing relied on external credit, necessitating approval from the Legislative Assembly. For these reasons, Ortiz was criticized for having "electoralized" the government's economic program, creating a plan that bolstered Áñez's presidential candidacy rather than focusing on short-term crises, as his predecessor had done. Chávez regarded that outcome as expected, given that Ortiz was "a politician before an economist."

Up until May, Ortiz had served as Áñez's campaign manager, supporting her effort to retain a hold over the presidency through the Juntos alliance, led by the MDS. Though Ortiz officially ceased campaign functions upon entering the cabinet, political calculations continued to influence his decision-making. In September, amid low poll numbers, Áñez withdrew her candidacy, a decision Ortiz "adamantly opposed". Without a presidential candidate at the top of the ticket, the MDS's entire ballot was annulled, leaving the party devoid of parliamentary representation, a fact that caused great unrest among its leadership. Tensions between Áñez and Ortiz peaked in late September after he disobeyed the president's order to block the payment of legislators' salaries, a move intended to pressure the Legislative Assembly into authorizing health funds. "This fact greatly annoyed President Áñez, who interpreted it as a clear and explicit disobedience to her authority."

The culmination of Ortiz's rupture with the president came on 22 September, following Áñez's decision to yield the government's ninety-two percent stake in the Cochabamba Light and Power Company (ELFEC) to its former owner, the Cochabamba Mixed Telecommunications Cooperative. ELFEC was nationalized in 2010, with its annual profits transferred to the National Electricity Company from there on. The decree authorizing the return of shares was formulated by the Ministry of Government, headed by Murillo, despite the fact that electrification policy was not part of the ministry's purview. Economists criticized the decision as an attempt at privatization through an irregular fast-tracked procedure. For Ortiz, the decree "[went] against the legal system" by returning the shares without a prior audit process or legal review. For these reasons, he remained unwilling to sign the document, resulting in his departure from office, accompanied by two other ministers.

Murillo blamed the cabinet crisis on "regionalism," accusing Ortiz of responding to the political interests of "lodges and regional powers." (Note: Ortiz's history working for business entities historically dominated by Los Caballeros del Oriente—one of Santa Cruz's two most influential secret societies, together with Los Toborochi—had been the source of longstanding speculation and hearsay. Ortiz routinely denied these claims, stating that he never belonged "to any lodge or secret society".) For his part, Ortiz stated that the transitional government in its final weeks had taken an interest in speeding up last-minute contracts and taking on new financial obligations, something he believed should be left to the incoming government. He blamed the minister of government for these dealings, accusing Áñez of having "handed over the future of the government and the country to Minister Murillo, who is a person who does not have the capacity."

== Ideology and political positions ==
Ortiz's political ideology has been referred to as center-right conservative. He is an adherent of democratic republicanism, advocating limited government in which power is distributed between the national government and the nine departments. To achieve this, Ortiz has proposed further decentralizing the country's pre-existing departmental autonomies by implementing a federalist system, granting them broader powers over their internal fiscal and domestic policies. Ortiz's economic views have been described as generally liberal, and he has been linked to Santa Cruz's agribusiness elite, with small personal investments in land and cattle. During his presidential campaign, he advocated restructuring the country's tax policy, implementing a system with fewer taxes on individuals and loosened regulations on corporations but with more effective coverage and collection capacity. At the same time, Ortiz's economic program never contemplated the privatization or closure of State-owned enterprises previously established or nationalized during the Morales era, nor did it consider major changes to the pre-existing salary policy.

A practicing Roman Catholic, Ortiz has expressed opposition to the legalization of abortion; as a senator, he voted against reforms to the Penal Code that would have expanded the grounds for legally terminating a pregnancy. Instead, Ortiz stated that authorities "should not wait for a femicide to occur", outlining the expansion of criminal sanctions and access to public services as a means of reducing the need for abortions. On LGBT rights, Ortiz conveyed his support for the community's right to life without discrimination, though he opposes the recognition of same-sex unions as marriages or the adoption of minors by same-sex couples. During his 2019 campaign, Ortiz referred to the evangelist presidential candidacy of Chi Hyun Chung, conveying his belief that "the presidency is [not] a religious position."

== Electoral history ==
Electoral history of Oscar Ortiz
Year	Office	Party	Alliance	Votes			Result	Ref.
Year	Office	Party	Alliance	Total	%	P.	Result	Ref.
2005	Senator	Independent	Social Democratic Power	261,845	41.80%	1st	Won	(Note: Presented on an electoral list. The data shown represents the share of the vote the entire party/alliance received in that constituency.)
2009	Senator	Popular Consensus	Consensus and National Unity	46,451	4.30%	3rd	Lost	
2014	Senator	Social Democratic Movement	Democratic Unity	506,704	39.82%	2nd	Won	
2019	President	Social Democratic Movement	Bolivia Says No	260,316	4.24%	4th	Annulled	
Source: Plurinational Electoral Organ | Electoral Atlas

== Publications ==
- Ortiz Antelo, Oscar (2017). Crónica de una Traición: Investigación del Fondo Indígena (in Spanish) (1st ed.). La Paz: Plural Editores. ISBN 978-99954-1-776-5.

Senate of Bolivia
Preceded by Guillermo Justiniano	Senator for Santa Cruz; 2006–2010; Served alongside: Jorge Aguilera, Guido Guardia	Succeeded by Germán Antelo
Preceded by José Villavicencio	President of the Senate; 2008–2010	Succeeded by Ana María Romero
Preceded by Félix Martínez	Senator for Santa Cruz; 2015–2020; Served alongside: Carlos Romero, Adriana Salvatierra; Felipa Merino, María Elva Pinckert, Carlos Pablo Klinsky	Succeeded by María Lourdes Landívar
Political offices
Office established	Secretary of Institutional Coordination and Autonomous Development of Santa Cruz; 2010–2014	Succeeded by Roxana Claure
Preceded by Wilfredo Rojo	Minister of Productive Development and the Plural Economy; 2020	Succeeded by Abel Martínez
Preceded by José Luis Parada	Minister of Economy and Public Finance; 2020	Succeeded by Branko Marinković
Party political offices
Preceded by Armando Calderón Sol	President of the Union of Latin American Parties; 2018–2021	Succeeded by Julián Obiglio
Preceded by Samuel Doria Medina; Alliance	Social Democratic Movement nominee for President of Bolivia; 2019	Succeeded by Jeanine Áñez; Withdrew
Academic offices
Preceded by Pablo Herrera	Rector of the Bolivian Catholic; University at Santa Cruz; 2021–present	Incumbent
