= Alfonso Ferrufino =

Bolivian politician (1942–2023)

Minister of Government
- In office 19 October 2003 – 17 August 2004
- President: Carlos Mesa
- Preceded by: Yerko Kukoc del Carpio
- Succeeded by: Saúl Lara

Personal details
- Born: Alfonso Ferrufino Valderrama; 30 March 1942; Cochabamba, Bolivia
- Died: 24 September 2023 (aged 81)
- Political party: MIR; MBL
- Education: Université catholique de Louvain
- Occupation: Sociologist; Lawyer

Hugo Alfonso "Fierro" Ferrufino Valderrama (30 March 1942 – 24 September 2023) was a Bolivian sociologist, lawyer, and politician. A member of the Revolutionary Left Movement and the Free Bolivia Movement, he served as Minister of Government from 2003 to 2004.

Ferrufino was born in Cochabamba on 30 March 1942, and died on 24 September 2023, at the age of 81.
