= Fernando Untoja =

Bolivia politician

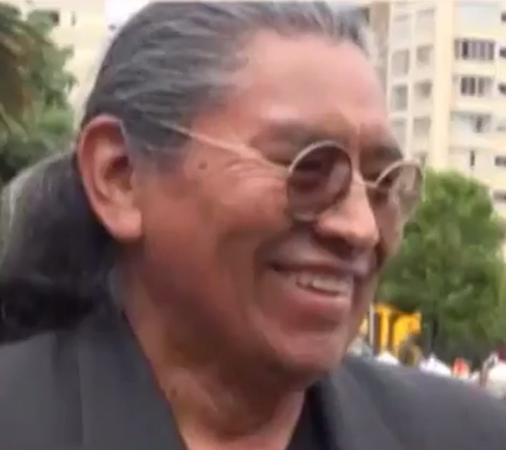
Fernando Untoja Choque in 2018

Fernando Untoja Choque (born March 30, 1950, in Oruro) is a Bolivian politician. An economist and political scientist, Untoja served as lecturer at Universidad Mayor de San Andrés in La Paz, the Universidad Técnica de Oruro, the Military Engineering School (EMI) and the Army Military College "Gualberto Villarroel". He was also a researcher at the Centro Andino de Desarollo Agropecuario. As a writer and political theorist, Untoja is one of the most prominent proponents of the thesis of a 'return to the ayllu' (the basic socio-political unit of Aymara society). 'The return to the ayllu' is also the title of a book written by Untoja.

On June 21, 1993, Untoja formed a political party, National Katarist Movement (MKN, a name borrowed from Tupac Katari). Untoja was the candidate of MKN in the 1993 presidential elections. He obtained 12,681 votes (0.77% of the nationwide vote).

He became a municipal councilor in Oruro in 1995. Later his party adopted a new name, Democratic National Katarism (KND). In 1997 he was elected to the Chamber of Deputies from Oruro through proportional representation from the list of the Nationalist Democratic Alliance (ADN), as part of the ADN-PDC-NFR alliance. He was the sole KND parliamentarian at the time. During the 1997-2002 parliamentary period, he was an ally of the right-wing government of former military dictator Hugo Banzer. His alternate in parliament was Mary Daza de Block.

In the 2009 election he stood as candidate from Plan Progress for Bolivia – National Convergence for the Senate from La Paz, but was not elected.
