= 1979–1980 Bolivian National Congress =

The Bolivian National Congress 1979–1980 was elected on 1 July 1979.

== Chamber of Deputies ==
Deputy	Alliance	Party	Department
Adalberto Kuajara Arandia	UDP	PCB	Santa Cruz
Adolfo Sánchez Suárez	ADN	ADN	Pando
Agapito Feliciano Monzón	MNR-A	MNR	Oruro
Alberto Ruíz Pérez	MNR-A	MNR	Tarija
Alcides Alvarado Daza	UDP	MNRI	La Paz
Aldo Flores Alvarez	UDP	PCB	La Paz
Alfonso Ferrufino Balderrama	UDP	MIR	Cochabamba
Alfonso Prado Luizaga	MNR-A	MNR	Cochabamba
Alfredo Nogales	MNR-A	MRTK-Chila	Potosí
Ángel Gemio Ergueta	MNR-A	MNR	Santa Cruz
Angel Vera	UDP	MNRI	La Paz
Antonio Araníbar Quiroga	UDP	MIR	La Paz
Armando Roncal Fernández	PS-1	PS-1	Chuquisaca
Augusto Cuadros Sánchez	MNR-A	MNR	Cochabamba
Augusto Gotrett Baldivieso	ADN	ADN	Potosí
Carlos Arancibia Vildoso	UDP	MNRI	Chuquisaca
Carlos Benquique Ojopi	MNR-A	MNR	Pando
Carlos Carrasco Fernandez	UDP	MNRI	Cochabamba
Carlos Carvajal Nava	UDP	PCB	Chuquisaca
Casiano Amurrio Rocha	MNR-A	PCML	Cochabamba
César Vela	UDP	MRTK	Chuquisaca
David Añez Pedraza	APIN	FSB	Beni
Dulfredo Rúa Bejarano	UDP	MIR	Potosí
Edgar Ramírez Santiestevan	UDP	PCB	Potosí
Edgar Tapia Reyes	UDP	MNRI	La Paz
Emma Navajas de Alandia	MNR-A	PDC	Tarija
Erasmo Pérez Victorias	MNR-A	PDC	Oruro
Ernesto Dolz Guerrero	MNR-A	PCML	Tarija
Eudoro Galindo	ADN	ADN	Cochabamba
Félix Rospigliossi Nieto	UDP	MNRI	La Paz
Francisco Portales Gonzáles	MNR-A	PDC	Santa Cruz
Fredy Vargas Méndez	APIN	UDC	Cochabamba
Gaston Encinas Valverde	UDP	MIR	Chuquisaca
Gerardo Mercado Mendoza	ADN	ADN	Beni
Germán Condori Quispe	UDP	MNRI	La Paz
Germán Gutiérrez Ortega	MNR-A	MNR	Chuquisaca
Gonzalo Sánchez de Lozada	MNR-A	MNR	Cochabamba
Grover Villegas Gallo	MNR-A	MNR	Potosí
Guido Capra Gemio	UDP	CERNA	La Paz
Guido Rodríguez Parada	MNR-A	MNR	Beni
Guillermo Bedregal Gutiérrez	MNR-A	MNR	La Paz
Guillermo Capobianco Rivera	UDP	MIR	Santa Cruz
Guillermo Ortiz Aponte	ADN	ADN	Beni
Guillermo Richter Ascimani	MNR-A	PCML	Beni
Gustavo Villegas Cortez	MNR-A	MNR	Potosí
Hans Dellien Salazar	MNR-A	PDC	Beni
Heberto Castedo Lladó	ADN	ADN	Santa Cruz
Hernán Melgar Justiniano	UDP	PCB	Beni
Hernán Peralta	MNR-A	MNR	Potosí
Hugo Flores Salvador	MNR-A	MNR	Santa Cruz
Hugo Velasco Rosales	MNR-A	MNR	Santa Cruz
Humberto Siles Miranda	ADN	FSB-M	Oruro
Jaime Taborga Torrico	PS-1	PS-1	Cochabamba
Jaime Tapia Alípaz	ADN	FSB-M	La Paz
Jaime Villegas Duran	MNR-A	MNR	Potosí
Javier Campero Paz	MNR-A	MNR	Tarija
Jesús Egüez Ruiz	ADN	ADN	Beni
Jhonny Bernal	UDP	MNRI	La Paz
Jorge Agreda Valderrama	MNR-A	PDC	Cochabamba
Jorge Alderete Rosales	MNR-A	MNR	Santa Cruz
Jorge Arteaga Flores	MNR-A	MNR	Pando
Jorge Justiniano Balderrama	MNR-A	MNR	Pando
José Fellman Velarde	MNR-A	MNR	La Paz
José Luis Harb Alvárez	MNR-A	MNR	La Paz
José María Palacios López	PS-1	PS-1	La Paz
José Mario Serrate Paz	APIN	FSB	Santa Cruz
José Ortuste Quiroga	MNR-A	PDC	Chuquisaca
José Zegarra Cerruto	APIN	MARC	La Paz
Juan José Salazar Terceros	MNR-A	MNR	Santa Cruz
Julio Quiñones Flores	MNR-A	MNR	Potosí
Julio Tumiri Apaza	MITKA	MITKA	La Paz
Justiniano Ninavia Colque	MNR-A	PCML	Oruro
Justo Pérez García	PS-1	PS-1	Potosí
Leopoldo Fernández Ferreira	ADN	ADN	Pando
Leopoldo López Cossío	UDP	MIR	Tarija
Leopoldo Vaca Chuquipera	UDP	POR-TP	Pando
Lidia Gueiler Tejada	MNR-A	PRIN-G	La Paz
Lino Pérez Estrada	ADN	ADN	Potosí
Luis Fernández Fagalde	UDP	MIR	Potosí
Luis Fernando Valle Quevedo	ADN	ADN	La Paz
Luis Sandoval Morón	UDP	MIN	Santa Cruz
Luis Saucedo Justiniano	MNR-A	PDC	Santa Cruz
Macabeo Chila Prieto	MNR-A	MRTK-Chila	Oruro
Manuel Huayllas Rosales	MNR-A	MNR	Chuquisaca
Marcelo Quiroga Santa Cruz	PS-1	PS-1	Cochabamba
Marcos Domic Ruiz	UDP	PCB	La Paz
Mario Aguilar Zenteno	ADN	FSB-M	Cochabamba
Mario Amézaga Antezana	PUB	PUB	Cochabamba
Mario Morales	UDP	MNRI	Oruro
Mario Suárez Montero	MNR-A	PDC	Santa Cruz
Medardo Irigoyen	APIN	MARC	Oruro
Miguel Ramírez Navarro	MNR-A	MNR	Chuquisaca
Miguel Torrico Baptista	ADN	MNR-J	Cochabamba
Oscar Bonifaz Gutiérrez	MNR-A	PDC	Potosí
Oscar García Suárez	UDP	MIN	Cochabamba
Oscar Justiniano Mercado	ADN	MNR-J	Santa Cruz
Oscar Lazcano Henry	ADN	ADN	Tarija
Oscar Salas Moya	UDP	PCB	Oruro
Oscar Vega López	UDP	MNRI	Cochabamba
Pablo Steimbach Moreno	MNR-A	MNR	Santa Cruz
Pedro Canaviri Limachi	UDP	MRTK	Potosí
Pedro Paputsakis Flores	MNR-A	PCML	Tarija
Ramiro Velasco Romero	UDP	MPLN	La Paz
Raúl Guzmán-Moreira	UDP	MNRI	Potosí
Raúl Pérez Alcalá	MNR-A	MNR	Potosí
Raúl Zabalaga Mendoza	MNR-A	PRA	Potosí
René de la Barra	UDP	MNRI	La Paz
Reynaldo Barrón Escóbar	MNR-A	MNR	Chuquisaca
Roberto Feryre Elías	ADN	ADN	La Paz
Rubén Sánchez Valdivia	UDP	ALIN	Cochabamba
Sabino Tito Atahuichi Ticona	UDP	PS-Atahuichi	Oruro
Simón Reyes Rivera	UDP	PCB	Potosí
Waldo Cerruto Calderón	ADN	ADN	La Paz
Walter Martínez Iglesias	UDP	MNRI	La Paz
Wenceslao Inarra Fernández	MNR-A	MNR	Tarija
Willy Sandoval Morón	UDP	MNRI	Chuquisaca
Willy Vargas Vacaflor	ADN	ADN	Chuquisaca

== Chamber of Senators ==
Senator	Alliance	Party	Department
Abel Ayoroa Argandoña	UDP	MNRI	La Paz
Benjamín Miguel Harb	MNR-A	PDC	La Paz
Ciro Villavicencio Ruiz	MNR-A	MNR	Pando
Edil Sandoval Morón	UDP	MNRI	Santa Cruz
Félix Vargas Lucero	MNR-A	PDC	Oruro
Fernando Baptista Gumucio	UDP	MNRI	Cochabamba
Genaro Frontanilla Vistas	MNR-A	MNR	Oruro
Gualberto Claure Ortuño	UDP	MNRI	Cochabamba
Guillermo Tineo Leygue	ADN	ADN	Beni
Gustavo Aguirre Pérez	ADN	ADN	Tarija
Jorge Alvarez Plata	UDP	MNRI	La Paz
Jorge Kolle Cueto	UDP	PCB	Chuquisaca
Jorge Selum Vaca Diez	MNR-A	PCML	Beni
José Luis Roca García	MNR-A	PDC	Pando
Julio Garrett Aillón	MNR-A	MNR	Chuquisaca
Leónidas Sánchez Arana	MNR-A	MNR	Potosí
Luis Añez Alvarez	MNR-A	MNR	Beni
Luis Pelaez Rioja	UDP	MNRI	Oruro
Miguel Trigo Rodríguez	MNR-A	MNR	Santa Cruz
Óscar Zamora Medinaceli	MNR-A	PCML	Tarija
Pánfilo Yapu	UDP	MIR	Potosí
Pedro Maillard Porras	MNR-A	MNR	Santa Cruz
Raúl Ruíz Gonzales	MNR-A	PCML	Potosí
Rubén Julio Castro	ADN	MNR-J	Pando
Víctor Quinteros Rasguido	MNR-A	PRA	Chuquisaca
Wálter Guevara Arze	MNR-A	PRA	Cochabamba
William Bluske Castellanos	MNR-A	MNR	Tarija

== Presidents of the National Congress ==
President	Alliance	Party		
Wálter Guevara Arze	MNR-A	PRA	August 1979	August 1979
Lidia Gueiler Tejada	MNR-A	PRIN-G	August 1979	November 1979
Wálter Guevara Arze	MNR-A	PRA	1980	July 1980

== Presidents of the Chamber of Senators ==
President	Alliance	Party		
Wálter Guevara Arze	MNR-A	PRA	August 1979	August 1979
Leónidas Sánchez Arana	MNR-A	MNR	August 1979	1980
Wálter Guevara Arze	MNR-A	PRA	1980	July 1980

== Presidents of the Chamber of Deputies ==
President	Alliance	Party		
Lidia Gueiler Tejada	MNR-A	PRIN-G	August 1979	November 1979
José Zegarra Cerruto	APIN	MARC	November 1979	July 1980

UDP – Democratic and Popular Union (Unidad Democratica y Popular). Electoral alliance formed by
Nationalist Revolutionary Movement of the Left, MNRI;
Communist Party of Bolivia, PCB;
Revolutionary Left Movement, MIR;
Tupaj Katari Revolutionary Movement, MRTK;
Movement of the National Left, MIN;
Popular Movement for National Liberation, MPLN;
Alliance of the National Left, ALIN;
Revolutionary Party of the Nationalist Left, PRIN;
Revolutionary Workers Party Trotskyist-Posadist, POR-TP;
Socialist Party-Sabino Tito Atahuichi, PS-Atahuichi;
Organization of Revolutionary Unity, OUR;
Center for the Study of Natural Resources, CERNA;
Revolutionary Party of the Workers of Bolivia, PRTB.

MNR-A – Revolutionary Nationalist Movement-Alliance (Movimiento Nacionalista Revolucionario-Alianza). Electoral alliance formed by
Revolutionary Nationalist Movement, MNR;
Tupaj Katari Revolutionary Movement-Chila, MRTK-Chila (faction led by Macabeo Chila);
Communist Party of Bolivia (Marxist–Leninist), PCML;
Christian Democratic Party, PDC;
Revolutionary Party of the National Left – Gueiler, PRIN-G;
Authentic Revolutionary Party, PRA (historical faction led by Walter Guevara Arce).

ADN – Nationalist Democratic Action.

FSB-M – Bolivian Socialist Falange-Moreira (faction led by Gaston Moreira Ostria).

PRA-R – Authentic Revolutionary Party- Ríos (faction led by Jorge Ríos Gamarra).

MNR-J – Revolutionary Nationalist Movement-Julio, (faction led by Rubén Julio Castro).

PS-1 – Socialist Party-One.

APIN – Popular Alliance for National Integration (Alianza Popular de Integración Nacional). Electoral alliance formed by
Revolutionary Agrarian Movement of the Bolivian Peasantry, MARC;
Bolivian Socialist Falange, FSB (faction led by Mario Gutiérrez Gutiérrez);
Christian Democratic Union, UDC.

MITKA – Indian Movement Tupaj Katari.

PUB – Bolivian Union Party.
