= 1982–1985 Bolivian National Congress =

The Bolivian National Congress 1982–1985 was elected on 29 June 1980.

== Chamber of Deputies ==
Deputy	Alliance	Party	Department
Abraham Salas Vidal	UDP	MIR	Oruro
Adalberto Kuajara Arandia	UDP	PCB	Santa Cruz
Agustín Ameller	MNR-A	PCML	Oruro
Alberto Tardío Maida	MNR-A	MNR	Cochabamba
Alcides Alvarado Daza	UDP	MNRI	La Paz
Alfonso Ferrufino Balderrama	UDP	MIR	Cochabamba
Alfredo Franco Guachalla	MNR-A	MNR	La Paz
Amalia Decker	UDP	MNRI	Cochabamba
Amoldo Lemas Vásquez	ADN	ADN	Tarija
Antonio Araníbar Quiroga	UDP	MIR	La Paz
Antonio Ormachea Méndez	ADN	ADN	La Paz
Armando Suárez Lamber	ADN	ADN	Beni
Carlos Benquique Ojopi	MNR-A	MNR	Pando
Carlos Calvo	ADN	ADN	Chuquisaca
Carlos Carvajal Nava	UDP	PCB	Chuquisaca
Carlos Pérez Guzmán	UDP	MNRI	Beni
Carlos Valverde Barbery	FSB	FSB	Santa Cruz
Cayetano Llobet Tavolara	PS-1	PS-1	Chuquisaca
Ciro Humboldt Barrero	MNR-A	MNR	Chuquisaca
Ciro Sánchez Saldaño	ADN	ADN	Santa Cruz
Constantino Lima Chávez	MITKA-1	MITKA-1	La Paz
Darío Durán Gutierrez	FSB	FSB	Beni
Digno Ramos	PS-1	PS-1	Potosí
Donald Baldivieso Fernández	MNRU	MNRU	Potosí
Edgar Barrientos Cazazola	ADN	ADN	Potosí
Edgar Ramírez Santiestevan	UDP	PCB	Potosí
Enrique Riveros Aliaga	FSB	FSB	Pando
Epifanio Conde Nina	UDP	MNRI	La Paz
Erasmo Pérez Victorias	FDR-NA	PDC	Oruro
Ernesto Gonzales Medina	PRA	PRA	Potosí
Eudoro Galindo	ADN	ADN	Cochabamba
Fanor Vega	MNR-A	MNR	Cochabamba
Federico Alvarez Plata Pinto	UDP	MNRI	La Paz
Feliciano Montoya Vargas	UDP	MNRI	Cochabamba
Felipe Flores Zambrana	PS-1	PS-1	Oruro
Félix Rospigliossi Nieto	UDP	MNRI	La Paz
Fernando Barthelemy Martínez	MNR-A	MNR	Pando
Fernando Kieffer Guzmán	ADN	ADN	La Paz
Flavio Machicado Saravia	PRA	PRA	La Paz
Florencio Gabriel Mamani	UDP	MNRI	Potosí
Francisco Figueroa Velasco	MNR-A	MNRI-1	Tarija
Francisco Gonzáles Sueldo	MNR-A	MNR	Santa Cruz
Franz Ondarza Linares	ADN	ADN	Cochabamba
Freddy León Maguiña	PS-1	PS-1	La Paz
Fredy Auza Raya	MNR-A	MNR	Tarija
Fulgencio Maldonado	UDP	MNRI	La Paz
Gabriel Pórcel Salazar	UDP	PCB	Potosí
Gastón Encinas Valverde	UDP	MIR	Chuquisaca
Gerardo Sánchez Vega	MNR-A	MNR	Pando
Germán Gutiérrez Gantier	MNR-A	MNR	Chuquisaca
Gonzalo Sánchez de Lozada	MNR-A	MNR	Cochabamba
Gregorio Andrade	UDP	MIR	La Paz
Gualberto Claure Ortuño	UDP	MNRI	Cochabamba
Guido Camacho Rodríguez	ADN	ADN	Cochabamba
Guido Capra Gemio	UDP	CERNA	La Paz
Guido Gonzáles	ADN	ADN	Santa Cruz
Guido Juvenal Arze	PS-1	PS-1	Santa Cruz
Guillermo Bulacia Sálek	ADN	ADN	Santa Cruz
Guillermo Capobianco Rivera	UDP	MIR	Santa Cruz
Guillermo Fortún Suárez	ADN	ADN	La Paz
Guillermo Richter Ascimani	MNR-A	PCML	Beni
Gustavo Villegas Cortez	MNR-A	MNR	Potosí
Hernán Peralta Rodriguez	MNR-A	MNR	Potosí
Hernando Poppe Martínez	UDP	MNRI	La Paz
Horacio Tórres Guzmán	UDP	MNRI	Chuquisaca
Hugo Delín Barba	ADN	ADN	Beni
Hugo Velasco Rosales	MNR-A	MNR	Santa Cruz
Ivan Donoso Vásquez	UDP	MNRI	Tarija
Jaime Taborga Torrico	PS-1	PS-1	Cochabamba
Jaime Villegas Durán	MNR-A	MNR	Potosí
Javier Campero Paz	MNR-A	MNR	Tarija
Johny Bernal	MNR-A	MNRI-1	La Paz
Jorge Arias Saavedra	ADN	ADN	Oruro
Jorge Monje Zapata	ADN	ADN	La Paz
José Baldivieso	MNR-A	MNR	Santa Cruz
José María Palacios	PS-1	PS-1	La Paz
José Mercado Cuerllar	MNR-A	MNR	Beni
José Tirado Cruz	PS-1	PS-1	La Paz
José Valquirio	UDP	MIR	Pando
José Vargas	UDP	MNRI	Chuquisaca
Juan Carlos Durán Saucedo	MNR-A	MNR	Santa Cruz
Juan José Salazar Terceros	MNR-A	MNR	Santa Cruz
Juan Rodríguez Guagama	UDP	MPLN	Santa Cruz
Juan Salinas López	UDP	MNRI	Oruro
Juan Valdez Castro	UDP	PCB	Potosí
Julio Cori	UDP	MNRI	La Paz
Julio Quiñones Flores	MNR-A	MNR	Potosí
Leonardo Ferrel	MNRU	MIN	Cochabamba
Leopoldo Fernández Ferreira	ADN	ADN	Pando
Leopoldo López Cossío	UDP	MIR	Tarija
Lindo Fernández Chile	MNR-A	MNR	Oruro
Lino Pérez Estrada	ADN	ADN	Potosí
Luciano Tapia Quisbert	MITKA	MITKA	La Paz
Luis Fernando Valle Quevedo	ADN	ADN	La Paz
Manuel Cárdenas Mallo	UDP	MNRI	La Paz
Marcelo Quiroga Santa Cruz	PS-1	PS-1	Cochabamba
Marcos Domíc Ruiz	UDP	PCB	La Paz
Mario Roncal Antezana	UDP	MNRI	Potosí
Mario Velarde Dorado	UDP	MNRI	Santa Cruz
Miguel Majluf Morales	MNR-A	MNR	Beni
Oscar Bonifaz Gutiérrez	FDR-NA	PDC	Potosí
Oscar Gómez Landivar	MNR-A	MNR	Santa Cruz
Oscar Lazcano Henry	ADN	ADN	Tarija
Oscar Salas Moya	UDP	PCB	Oruro
Oscar Vega López	UDP	MNRI	Cochabamba
Osvaldo Maldonado	FDR-NA	PDC	Cochabamba
Pablo Steimbach Moreno	MNR-A	MNR	Santa Cruz
Pánfilo Yapu Condo	UDP	MIR	Potosí
Pedro Paputsakis Flores	MNR-A	PCML	Tarija
Pedro Ribera Sánchez	ADN	ADN	Santa Cruz
Ramiro Barrenechea Zambrana	UDP	PCB	Cochabamba
Ramiro Velasco Romero	UDP	MPLN	La Paz
Raúl Pérez Alcalá	MNR-A	MNR	Potosí
Raúl Rodríguez Quiroga	MNR-A	MNR	Pando
René Mostajo Deheza	FDR-NA	PDC	Chuquisaca
Reynaldo Barrón Escóbar	MNR-A	MNR	Chuquisaca
Rodolfo Greminger Durán	ADN	ADN	Beni
Samuel Gallardo Lozada	UDP	MNRI	Chuquisaca
Severo Tórrez Bravo	UDP	PCB	Potosí
Simón Reyes Rivera	UDP	PCB	Potosí
Vicente Mendoza Nava	FDR-NA	PDC	La Paz
Víctor Hugo Libera Cortéz	UDP	PCB	Beni
Vidal Avilés Tórres	UDP	MNRI	Chuquisaca
Walter Guevara Arze	PRA	PRA	Cochabamba
Walter Morales Ugarte	UDP	PCB	La Paz
Wálter Soriano Lea Plaza	ADN	ADN	Cochabamba
Walter Vásquez Michel	PS-1	PS-1	Oruro
Wenceslao Inarra Fernández	MNR-A	MNR	Tarija
Willy Vargas Vacaflor	ADN	ADN	Chuquisaca
Zenón Barrientos Mamani	UDP	MNRI	Oruro

== Chamber of Senators ==
Senator	Alliance	Party	Department
Abelardo Villalpando Retamozo	UDP	PCB	Potosí
Alfonso Camacho Peña	UDP	MIR	Cochabamba
Alfredo Monje Suárez	MNR-A	MNR	Beni
Carlos Barragán Vargas	UDP	PCB	Oruro
Carlos Moradey Texeira	ADN	ADN	Pando
Enrique Bachinelo	UDP	MNRI	Potosí
Federico Alvárez Plata	UDP	MNRI	La Paz
Fernando Baptista Gumucio	UDP	MNRI	Cochabamba
Guillermo Tineo Leygue	ADN	ADN	Beni
Gustavo Aguirre Pérez	ADN	ADN	Tarija
Heberto Castedo Lladó	ADN	ADN	Santa Cruz
Héctor Borda Leaño	PS-1	PS-1	Oruro
Héctor Ormachea Peñaranda	ADN	ADN	La Paz
Jaime Arellano Castañeda	MNR-A	MNR	Tarija
Jorge Antelo Urdininea	MNR-A	MNR	Santa Cruz
Jorge Arteaga Flores	MNR-A	MNR	Pando
Jorge Justiniano Balderrama	MNR-A	MNR	Pando
Jorge Kolle Cueto	UDP	PCB	Chuquisaca
Julio Garrett Ayllón	MNR-A	MNR	Chuquisaca
Leónidas Sánchez Arana	MNR-A	MNR	Potosí
Luis Añez Alvarez	MNR-A	MNR	Beni
Luis Pelaez Rioja	UDP	MNRI	Oruro
Mario Rolón Anaya	ADN	ADN	Cochabamba
Óscar Zamora Medinaceli	MNR-A	PCML	Tarija
Pedro Maillard Porras	MNR-A	MNR	Santa Cruz
René Quiroga Paz Soldán	UDP	MNRI	Chuquisaca
Víctor Andrade Uzquiano	UDP	MNRI	La Paz

== Presidents of the National Congress ==
President	Alliance	Party		
Jaime Paz Zamora	UDP	MIR	10 October 1982	14 December 1984
Julio Garrett Ayllón	MNRA	MNR	14 December 1984	August 1985

== Presidents of the Chamber of Senators ==
President	Alliance	Party		
Julio Garrett Ayllón	MNRA	MNR	October 1982	August 1983
Julio Garrett Ayllón	MNRA	MNR	August 1983	August 1984
Julio Garrett Ayllón	MNRA	MNR	August 1984	August 1985

== Presidents of the Chamber of Deputies ==
President	Alliance	Party		
Samuel Gallardo Lozada	UDP	MNRI	October 1982	August 1983
Gualberto Claure Ortuño	UDP	MNRI	August 1983	August 1984
Samuel Gallardo Lozada	UDP	MNRI	August 1984	August 1985

UDP – Democratic and Popular Union (Unidad Democratica y Popular). Electoral alliance formed by
Nationalist Revolutionary Movement of the Left, MNRI;
Communist Party of Bolivia, PCB;
Revolutionary Left Movement, MIR;
Popular Movement for National Liberation, MPLN;
Socialist Party-Sabino Tito Atahuichi, PS-Atahuichi;
Organization of Revolutionary Unity, OUR;
Center for the Study of Natural Resources, CERNA;
Workers' Vanguard Party, VO.

MNR-A – Revolutionary Nationalist Movement-Alliance (Movimiento Nacionalista Revolucionario-Alianza). Electoral alliance formed by
Revolutionary Nationalist Movement, MNR;
Communist Party of Bolivia (Marxist–Leninist), PCML;
Nationalist Revolutionary Movement of the Left-One, MNRI-1.

ADN – Nationalist Democratic Action.

PS-1 – Socialist Party-One.

FDR-NA – Democratic Revolutionary Front-New Alternative (Frente Democrático Revolucionario – Nueva Alternativa). Electoral alliance formed by
Christian Democratic Party, PDC;
Alliance of the National Left, ALIN;
Socialist Party-Guillermo Aponte Burela, PS-Aponte;
Offensive of the Democratic Left, OID;
Revolutionary Workers Party Trotskyist-Posadist, POR-TP.

PRA – Authentic Revolutionary Party.

MNRU – United Revolutionary Nationalist Movement.

MIN – Movement of the National Left;

FSB – Bolivian Socialist Falange.

MITKA-1 – Indian Movement Tupaj Katari-One.

MITKA – Indian Movement Tupaj Katari.
