= Communist Party of Bolivia (Marxist–Leninist–Maoist) =

Communist Party of Bolivia (Marxist-Leninist-Maoist) Partido Comunista de Bolivia (Marxista-Leninista-Maoísta)
- Abbreviation: PCB-MLM
- Secretary-General: Luis Alberto Echazú
- Founded: 1983
- Preceded by: CPB (ML)
- Newspaper: Liberación
- Ideology: Communism; Marxism–Leninism–Maoism
- Political position: Far-left
- International affiliation: ICMLPO (defunct); ICOR

Website
- www.maoistasbolivianos.blogspot.com

The Communist Party of Bolivia (Marxist-Leninist-Maoist) (PCB-MLM) is a Marxist–Leninist–Maoist communist party in Bolivia. When the Communist Party of Bolivia (Marxist–Leninist) (PCB-ML) broke with Maoism in 1983 and became Hoxhaist, a small group split from it and founded a new party with the same name. In 2004 it was renamed to its current name.

The PCB-MLM supported the government of Evo Morales.

It publishes Liberación since 1993.

== See also ==
- Communist Party of Bolivia
- Communist Party of Bolivia (Marxist–Leninist)
- People's Revolutionary Front (Marxist−Leninist−Maoist)
