= Revolutionary Left Front (Bolivia) =

Political party in Bolivia

Revolutionary Left Front Frente Revolucionario de Izquierda
- The flag features Bolivia's national flower, the Cantuta
- Chairperson: Edgar Guzmán Jáuregui
- Vice Chairperson: Víctor Hugo Landivar
- Secretary-General: Wálter Villagra Romay
- Founded: April 23, 1978
- Membership (2025): 71,477
- Ideology: Populism; Formerly: Communism; Left-wing nationalism
- Political position: Centre-right
- National affiliation: Libre
- Colors: Blue, red
- Chamber of Deputies: 4 / 130
- Senate of Bolivia: 0 / 36
- Politics of Bolivia; Political parties; Elections; A: The party has also been labeled as centrist and right-wing.

The Revolutionary Left Front (Spanish: Frente Revolucionario de Izquierda, FRI) is a populist centre-right political party in Bolivia, founded in 1978.

== Foundation ==
FRI was formed at a national conference of leftwing forces, held in La Paz April 23, 1978. The meeting was organized by an initiative committee (led by Dr. Guido Perales Aguilar as permanent secretary). The founding of FRI in April 1978 was a formalization of an already existing informal cooperation between different political groups. FRI was composed of the Communist Party of Bolivia (Marxist–Leninist) (PCB(ML)), Revolutionary Party of the Nationalist Left (PRIN), Revolutionary Party of the Workers of Bolivia (PRTB), POR-Combate, Vanguardia Comunista del POR (the latter two were Trotskyist groups) and an independent grouping led by Manuel Morales Dávila. POR-Masas was blocked from joining FRI. Óscar Zamora Medinaceli was the founding chairman of FRI, and politically FRI was under the control of PCB(ML). Lidia Gueiler Tejada was the vice president of FRI.

The declaration of principles of FRI reads that "FRI is the political instrument of the masses, which enables the accumulation of forces in order to defeat the dictatorship, impose democratic freedoms and achieve national liberation."

== 1978 and 1979 elections ==
The presidential candidate of FRI in the 1978 elections was Casiano Amurrio. Amurrio obtained 23,459 votes (1.2% of the national vote). In the parliamentary elections the FRI obtained the same result.

PRIN left FRI ahead of the 1979 elections, and joined UDP. Morales Dávila also broke away from FRI. FRI became little more than the public facade of PCB(ML), as other factions had deserted it. The group sought to merge with UDP, but failed. In the 1979 elections FRI was part of a larger coalition, the Democratic Alliance (along with the Revolutionary Nationalist Movement, the Christian Democratic Party and Wálter Guevara's PRA). Lidia Gueiler was the vice-presidential candidate of the alliance. The FRI won 5 seats.

== Later period ==
In the parliamentary elections of 1980 and 1985, it ran in alliance with the conservative MNR winning each time three seats. In 1989 and 1993 elections, FRI was part of the Patriotic Accord (the electoral pact between Hugo Banzer's Nationalist Democratic Action and the Revolutionary Left Movement) winning four and two seats respectively. In 1997 it won one seat on a list of the MIR.

On October 6, 2018, Carlos de Mesa Gisbert announced on his YouTube channel, that he would run for president under the Revolutionary Left Front party, almost one year before the 2019 Bolivian general election. In the 2020 election, FRI once again supported Mesa and elected three Deputies, returning to Parliament.

== Municipal and regional politics ==
Electoral flyer for the FRI candidate for mayor of La Paz in 1999, Eusebio Gironda

During the 1990s, the intervention in municipal politics of the party was generally limited to the Tarija and Cochabamba departments. The FRI chairman Zamora Medinaceli was mayor of Tarija in 1987–1989, 1994–1996 and 1996–1997. In the 1991 municipal elections, the party got 20,179 votes (1.55% of the nationwide vote), whilst in the 1993 municipal election it obtained 25,099 votes (2.24%). In the 1991 municipal elections, the party had the highest percentage of female candidates in the major cities amongst all contesting parties (8 out of 36 candidates, 22.2%). In 1993 eleven out of 52 FRI candidates were women. In the 1995 municipal elections, the vote of the party reached 53,540 (3.12%). The party won 27 municipal council seats (out of 1585 in all of Bolivia). The party won 17 municipal council seats (out of a total of 1,700 in all of Bolivia) in the 1999 municipal elections.

The party supported the candidature of Mario Cossío for governor of Tarija in the 2010 elections.

== Election results ==
=== Presidential elections ===
Election	Presidential nominee	Votes	%	Votes	%	Result
Election	Presidential nominee	First round		Second round		Result
1978	Casiano Amurrio	23,459	1.21%			Lost ✗
1979	Víctor Paz Estenssoro (MNR)	527,184	35.87%	64 (Note: After no candidate won more than 50% of the vote in the general election, the National Congress was required to elect the president in an indirect second round.)	44.44	Lost ✗
1980	Víctor Paz Estenssoro (MNR)	263,706	20.15%			Lost ✗
1985	Víctor Paz Estenssoro (MNR)	456,704	30.36%	94	64.83	Elected ✓
1989	Hugo Banzer (ADN)	357,298	25.24%			Lost ✗
1993	Hugo Banzer (ADN)	346,865	21.05%			Lost ✗
1997	Jaime Paz Zamora (MIR)	365,005	16.77%			Lost ✗
2002	Did not contest					
2005	Did not contest					
2009	Did not contest					
2014	Did not contest					
2019	Carlos Mesa	2,240,920	36.51%			Annulled ✗
2020	Carlos Mesa	1,775,953	28.83%			Lost ✗
2025	Jorge Quiroga (Libre)	1,430,176	26.70%	2,881,972	45.11%	Lost ✗

=== Chamber of Deputies and Senate elections ===
Election	Party leader	Votes	%	Chamber seats	+/-	Position	Senate seats	+/-	Position	Status
1979	Óscar Zamora Medinaceli	As part of MNR-A		4 / 117	New	▲6th	1 / 27	New	▲4th	Opposition
1980	Óscar Zamora Medinaceli	As part of MNR-A		3 / 130	▼1	▼8th	0 / 27	▼1	▼5th	Opposition
1985	Óscar Zamora Medinaceli	In coalition with MNR		3 / 130	0	▼10th	0 / 27	0	▲4th	Coalition
1989	Óscar Zamora Medinaceli	As part of AP		3 / 130	0	▲6th	1 / 27	▲1	▲5th	Opposition
1993	Óscar Zamora Medinaceli	As part of AP		2 / 130	▼2	6th	0 / 27	▼1	5th	Opposition
1997	Óscar Zamora Medinaceli	In coalition with MIR		0 / 130	▼2	▼8th	1 / 27	▲1	▼6th	Opposition
2002	Did not contest			0 / 130	0	—N/a	0 / 27	▼1	—N/a	Extra-parliamentary
2005	Did not contest			0 / 130	0	—N/a	0 / 27	0	—N/a	Extra-parliamentary
2009	Did not contest			0 / 130	0	—N/a	0 / 36	0	—N/a	Extra-parliamentary
2014	Did not contest			0 / 130	0	—N/a	0 / 36	0	—N/a	Extra-parliamentary
2019	Carlos Mesa	As part of CC		50 / 130	▲50	▲2nd	14 / 36	▲14	▲2nd	Annulled
2020	Carlos Mesa	As part of CC		39 / 130	▼11	2nd	11 / 36	▼3	2nd	Opposition
2025	Edgar Guzmán Jáuregui	As part of Libre		39 / 130	0	2nd	12 / 36	▲1	2nd	Opposition
