= Revolutionary Party of the National Left =

The Revolutionary Party of the National Left (Spanish: Partido Revolucionario de la Izquierda Nacional, PRIN) was a left-wing political party in Bolivia. It was founded in 1963 by the labor leader Juan Lechín Oquendo and by Mario Torres Calleja and Edwin Moller in lesser roles. The PRIN seceded from the Revolutionary Nationalist Movement (MNR) in protest against Víctor Paz Estenssoro's decision to seek a third elected term as president in 1964, rather than permit then Vice-President Juan Lechín to have the MNR's presidential nomination.

The PRIN combined the left wing of the MNR and former members of the Revolutionary Workers' Party (POR). The PRIN's ideological position espouses left-wing nationalism, rather than socialism in more traditional terms. It is critical of bourgeois influence in the main body of the MNR.

Electorally, the PRIN abstained in the 1964 and 1966 presidential votes. After the military coup of 1964, the PRIN was forced underground. It was also weakened because Juan Lechín was deported to Paraguay by the military junta, he spent many years in exile between 1965 and 1978. The PRIN was once again suppressed in the 1970s by the military under the presidency of Hugo Banzer.

After 1971, its position as the main party to the left of the MNR was supplanted by a new party formed by Hernán Siles, the Nationalist Revolutionary Movement of the Left (MNRI).

In 1978 the Revolutionary Party of the National Left took part in an electoral coalition Leftist Revolutionary Front backing Casiano Amurrio Rocha (Marxist Leninist Communist Party) and Domitila Chúngara (independent) as its vice-president.

For the 1979 elections, the PRIN was the component of the Democratic and Popular Union, with the MNRI's Hernán Siles Zuazo as the coalition's presidential candidate.

Following the end of military rule in 1979, a member of the PRIN, Lidia Gueiler Tejada, was appointed interim president. Gueiler was the first woman to serve as president in Bolivia.

The PRIN ran Juan Lechín Oquendo as its candidate on 29 June 1980, it garnered only a 01.20% vote. Through almost two decades of existence, the PRIN has not been able to reach far beyond a role as the personal political vehicle of Juan Lechín Oquendo, whose status as Bolivia's most charismatic labor leader was unchallenged nearly forty years after he first entered politics.

A split in 1979–1980 established the Revolutionary Party of the National Labour Left (Partido Revolucionario de la Izquierda Nacional Laboral, PRIN-L); a minor socialist party with a collective leadership including Edwin Moller and the Revolutionary Party of the National Left – Gueiler (Partido Revolucionario de la Izquierda Nacional Gueiler, PRIN-G), a defunct party led by Lidia Gueiler Tejada.

In 1985 the Revolutionary Party of the National Left took part in an electoral coalition United People's Front backing Antonio Aranibar Quiroga (Free Bolivia Movement) and Oscar Salas Moya (Communist Party of Bolivia) as its vice-president.
