= Cabinet of Lidia Gueiler =

Lidia Gueiler Tejada was inaugurated on 16 November 1979 as Provisional President of Bolivia and formed her cabinet on 19 November 1979.

Ministry / Date	19.11.1979	14.02.1980	29.02.1980	10.03.1980	07.04.1980	07.04.1980	08.05.1980
Foreign and Religious Affaire	Julio Garrett Aillón, MNR					Gastón Aráoz Levy, MNR	
Interior, Migration and Justice	Jorge Selun Vaca Diez, PCML				Antonio Arnez Camacho, mil		
National Defense	Miguel Ayoroa Montaño, mil	Antonio Arnez Camacho, mil				Walter Nunez Rivero, mil	
Finance	Augusto Cuádros Sánchez, MNR			Adolfo Aramayo Anze, MNR			
Planning and Co-ordination	Jorge Agreda Valderrama, PDC					Jaime Ponce Garcia, PDC	
Education and Culture	Carlos Antonio Carrasco Fernandez, MNRI						
Labor and Union Affairs	Oscar García Suárez, MIN	Isaac Sandóval Rodríguez, ind					Raúl Jiménez Sanjinés, ind
Industry, Commerce and Tourism	Eduardo Arauco Paz, MNR	Juan Carlos Navajas Mogro, ind					
Transport, Communications and Aviation	Hugo Velasco Rosales, MNR					Ernesto Rivero Villarroel, ind	
Mining and Metallurgy	Oscar Bonifaz Gutierrez, PDC					Jorge Gutierrez del Rio, ind	
Energy and Hydrocarbons	Víctor Quinteros Rasguido, PRA					Manuel Cuevas Aguilera, ind	
Agriculture and Peasant Affairs	Luis Anez Alvarez, MNR	Mario Viscarra Ayala, MNR					
Health and Social Security	Ayda Claros de Bayá, PDC					Hugo Palazzi Moscoso, ind	
Housing and Urbanism	René Higueras del Barco, PCML					Ernesto Wende Frankel, ind	
Economic Integration	Pánfilo Anavi, PCML	Fernando Salazar Paredes, PCML					
Press and Information	Oscar Peña Franco, PCML						
Secretary to the Cabinet	Gastón Aráoz Levy, MNR		Salvador Romero Pitari, MNR				
Parliamentary Affairs	Benjamín Miguel Harb, PDC	no	no	no	no	no	no
Social Affairs	Elba Ojara de Jemio, MNR						

MNR – Revolutionary Nationalist Movement

PDC – Christian Democratic Party

PCML – Communist Party of Bolivia (Marxist–Leninist)

PRA – Authentic Revolutionary Party

MNRI – Leftwing Revolutionary Nationalist Movement

MIN – Movement of the National Left

mil – military

ind – independent
