= Oscar Zamora =

Oscar Zamora may refer to:

- Óscar Zamora Medinaceli (1934–2017), Bolivian politician
- Oscar Zamora (baseball) (born 1944), Cuban baseball player
