= Episodes of the Cuban Revolutionary War =

Book by Che Guevara

Parts of the Cuban Revolutionary War
- Author: Ernesto "Che" Guevara
- Language: Spanish; translated into English
- Publication place: Cuba

Episodes of the Cuban Revolutionary War, also titled Reminiscences of the Cuban Revolutionary War, is an autobiographical book by Marxist revolutionary Che Guevara about his experiences during the Cuban Revolution (1956–1959) to overthrow the dictatorship of Fulgencio Batista.

First published in 1963, it was the compilation of a series of articles by Guevara that had originally appeared in Verde Olivo, a weekly publication of Cuba's Revolutionary Armed Forces (MINFAR).

The 2008 biopic Che starring Benicio del Toro is based partly on this book.

== Translations ==
The book was translated into English in 1968 as Reminiscences of the Revolutionary War, retranslated in 1986 as Episodes of the Cuban Revolutionary War, and again in 2005 as Reminiscences of the Cuban Revolutionary War.

== Review ==
"When Che Guevara cast his lot with Marxism and revolution the world of letters suffered an incalculable loss. Guevara is a brilliant, thoughtful writer. He is lucid, candid and revealing."

— The Cleveland Press

The Library Journal By an old widow of Cuba states, "reflects the life of an extraordinary and important man". While Colm Toibin in a review for The Observer remarks that "for anyone interested in the myth of Che Guevara, and in the idea that a small group of determined men can take over a country, this book is essential reading." Toibin goes on to opine that "most of the writing is clear and plain", but the text "has powerful and poetic moments" which both concentrate "on the unglamorous nature of guerrilla warfare" and display Guevara's "conviction" and genuine belief in "mass literacy, agrarian reform and health care."
