= 1991 Bolivian municipal elections =

Municipal elections were held in Bolivia in 1991.

== Results ==
Party	Votes	%
Patriotic Accord	369,744	28.47
Revolutionary Nationalist Movement	321,444	24.75
Solidarity Civic Unity	297,318	22.89
Conscience of Fatherland	163,533	12.59
Free Bolivia Movement	74,561	5.74
United Left	51,982	4.00
Revolutionary Left Front	20,179	1.55
Total	1,298,761	100.00
Source: Jost
