= Tejada (surname) =

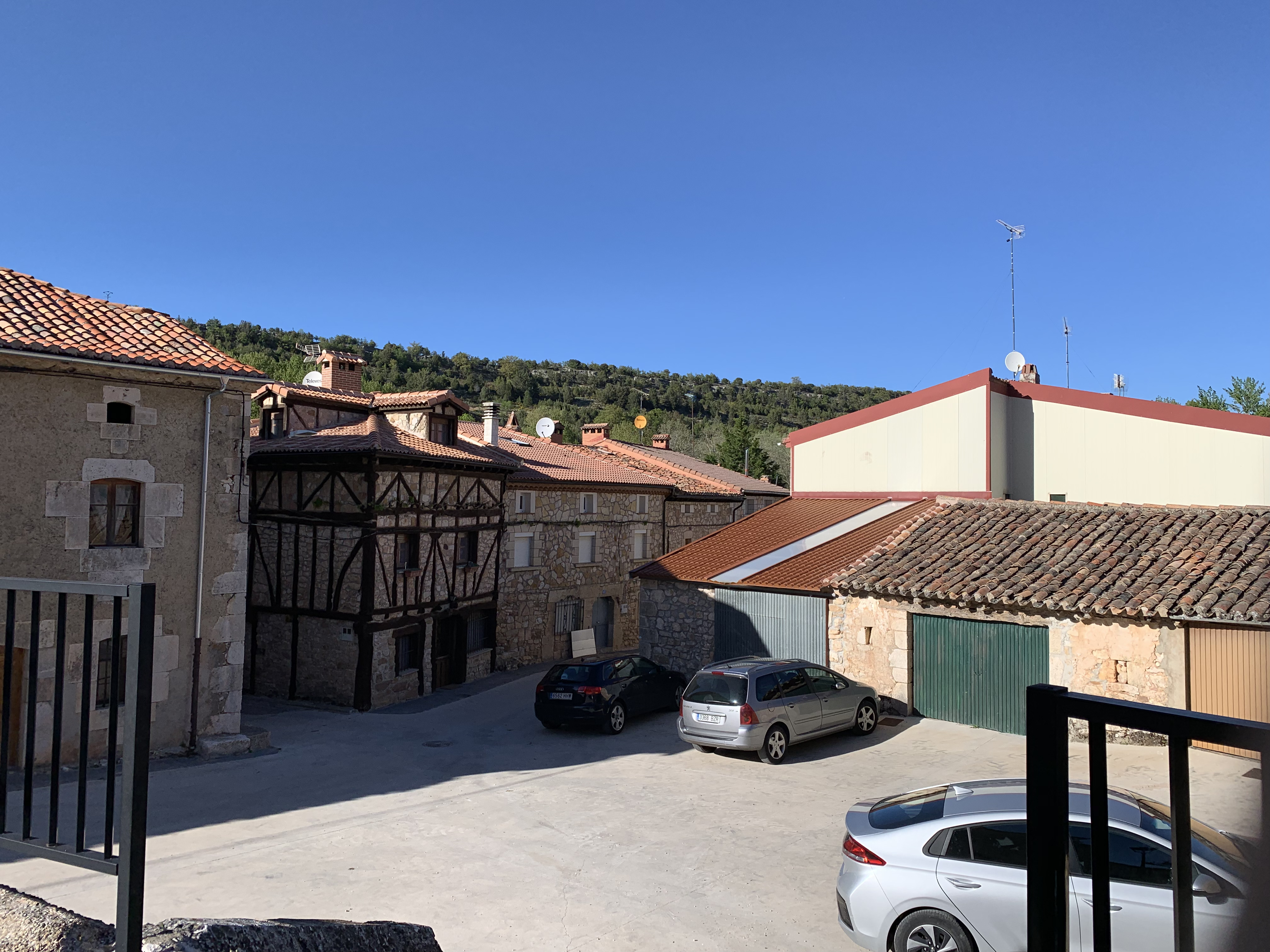
- Streets in the town of Tejada, Burgos
- Pronunciation: Spanish: [teˈxaða]

Origin
- Origin: Spanish
- Meaning: from "Teja" meaning ‘(roof) tile’ or 'lime tree'
- Region of origin: Seville and Castile, Spain

Other names
- Variant form: numerous

Tejada is a surname of Spanish origin. It is locational from the town of Tejada.

== Distribution ==
The distribution of Spanish births, are most common in Seville with 9.57% of people with the surname and it being their first surname, Madrid (7.90%), Barcelona (7.85%), Granada (6.83%) and Badajoz (6.71%).

== People ==
- Cosme Gómez Tejada de los Reyes (died c. 1661), Spanish writer, poet and dramatist
- Manuel de Velasco y Tejada (born 17th c.), Spanish commander
- Martín Fernández de Navarrete y Ximénez de Tejada (1765–1844), Spanish sailor and historian
- Miguel Lerdo de Tejada (1812–1861), Mexican statesman and leader of the Revolution of Ayutla
- Miguel Lerdo de Tejada (composer) (1869–1941), Mexican composer
- Sebastián Lerdo de Tejada (1823–1889), jurist and Liberal president of Mexico
- Manuel Aguirre de Tejada (1827–1911) Spanish politician and lawyer
- José Joaquín Tejada (1867–1934), Cuban painter
- José Luis Tejada Sorzano (1882–1938), 34th President of Bolivia, 23rd Vice President of Bolivia
- Gabriel Gosálvez Tejada (1899–1957), Bolivian economist and diplomat
- Francisco Elías de Tejada y Spínola (1917–1978), Spanish scholar and politician
- Lidia Gueiler Tejada (1921–2011), 56th President of Bolivia
- Luis García Meza Tejada (1929–2018), 57th President of Bolivia
- Raquel Tejada (1940–2023), American actress
- Alberto Tejada Noriega (born 1956), Peruvian football referee
- John Tejada (born 1974), Mexican-American music producer
- Miguel Tejada (born 1974), Dominican baseball player
- Carlos Tejada (born 1980), Venezuelan volleyball player
- Luis Tejada (born 1982), Panamanian football player
- Francisco Jiménez Tejada (born 1986), Spanish football player
- Rubén Tejada (born 1989), Panamanian baseball player
