= Mario Monje =

Bolivian politician (1929–2019)

Mario Monje Molina (29 March 1929 – 15 January 2019) was a Bolivian politician, founder Secretary-General of the Communist Party of Bolivia (Partido Comunista Boliviano, PCB). When the party split into a pro-Soviet and a pro-Beijing wing in 1964, he became the leader of the pro-Soviet wing. He agreed to help Che Guevara incite a revolution in Bolivia in 1966, but later changed his mind. Aleida March (Che's widow) blames Monje for the death of her husband.

Monje Molina died on January 15, 2019, of pneumonia in Moscow.

== In popular culture ==
Monje Molina was portrayed by actor Lou Diamond Phillips in the 2008 film Che: Part Two.
