= Jorge Vázquez Viaña =

Bolivian revolutionary (1939–1967)

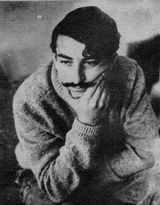
Jorge Vázquez Viaña

Jorge Vázquez Viaña (born 2 January 1939 in La Paz; Bolivia, presumed dead, May 1967; Nickname: El Loro or Bigotes) was a Bolivian revolutionary. He was part of the intellectual revolutionary guerrilla group of Che Guevara.

== Biography ==
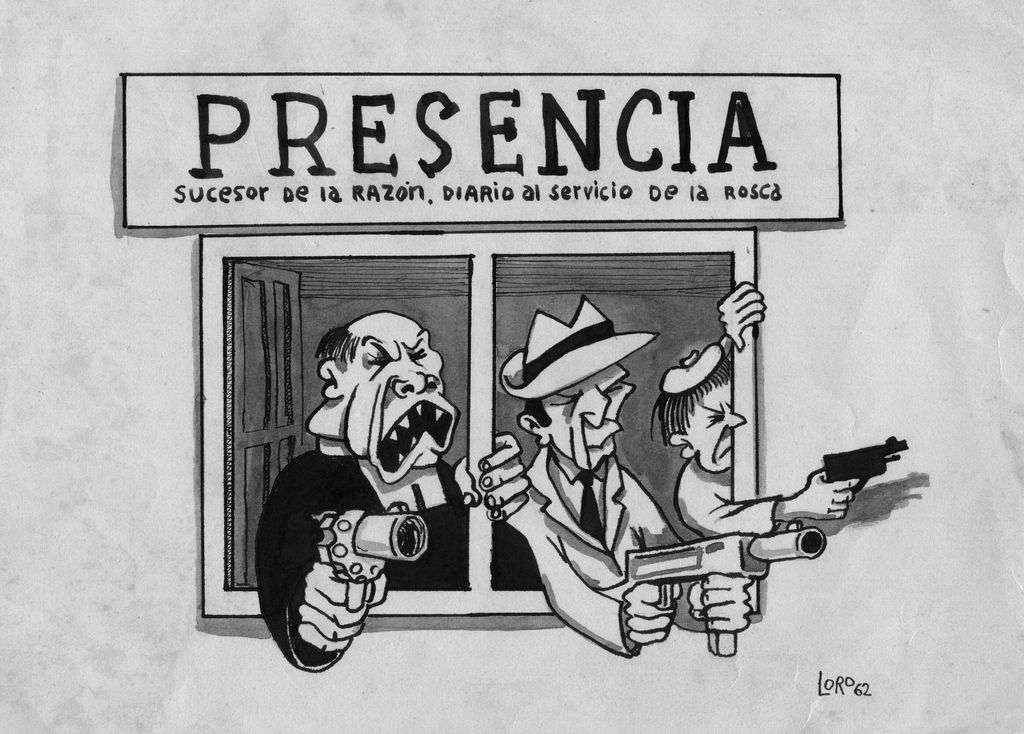

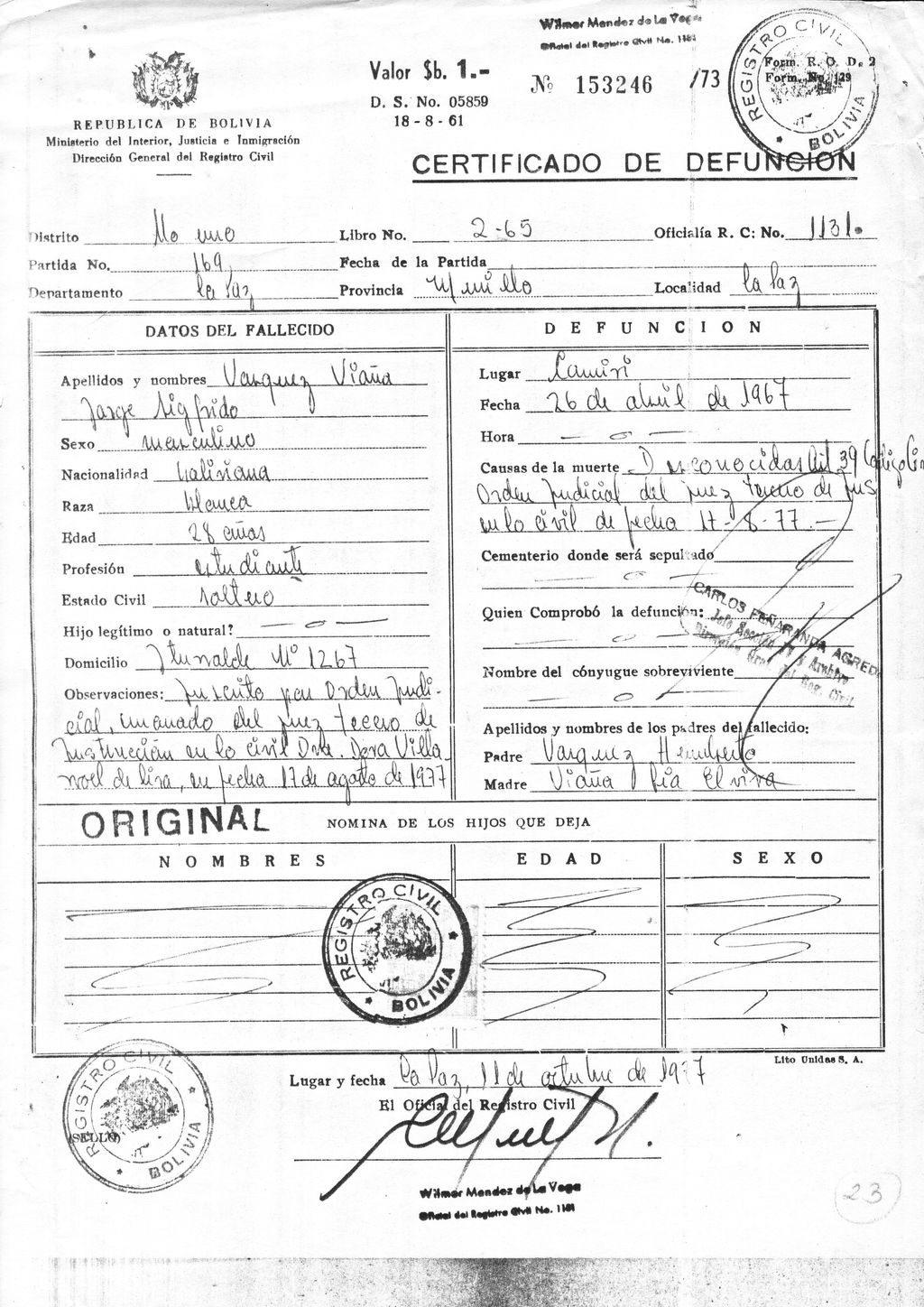

He was raised in a conservative, affluent family, where he grew up with his older brother, Humberto, in La Paz, Bolivia. His father, Dr. Humberto Vázquez Machicado, was a noted historian and his mother, Elvira Viana Canedo, was a pianist. After completing his education at the Institute La Salle (Colegio La Salle, La Paz, Bolivia ), he traveled to Germany in 1957 with his brother and enrolled as a student of Geology at the Ludwig-Maximilians-Universität München. There, he co-founded the Society of Bolivian students in 1958 and also became its president.

In addition to his geology studies, he was quite interested in art (his used to accompany his nickname "Loro" with a small sketch, this nickname was also mentioned in Che Guevara's Bolivian Diary). His socially critical caricatures were published in order to demonstrate his political point of view.

Inspired by East German socialism, he immersed himself in the communist ideology. It was not surprising that upon returning to Bolivia in 1962, he became a member of the PCB, the Communist Party of Bolivia. A year later, he was already active in the PCBs underground movement running a secret printing press in La Paz. Using a finca (farm) near Emborozú, he was involved in transporting weapons to a Masetti guerrilla group in Argentina. Jorge then traveled to Cuba near the end of 1965 where he and other members of the PCB were trained in guerrilla tactics. Jorge Vázquez Viana went back home in July 1966 in order to prepare for Che Guevara's revolution in Bolivia. He reached the base camp in Ñancahuazú in November 1966. Primarily he was chosen for logistic tasks, on 25 January 1967 he was transferred to leading the forefront. As a result of a gunfight with the Bolivian army on 22 April 1967, he was wounded and taken prisoner.

== Death ==
According to the Bolivian Army, Jorge Vazquez Viana was hospitalized with a stomach wound in Camiri on 22 April 1967 after being captured. There is no record of him after 30 April 1967 ... he just "disappeared". Cuban sources confirm that following his incarceration Jorge was tortured, murdered and his body thrown out of a helicopter above the Bolivian jungle. Six other bodies from Che Guevara's guerrillas can not be found to date, Jorge Vázquez Viañas is just one of these unaccountable deaths. He is survived by his German wife and two children.

== Literature ==
- Guevara, Ernesto Che: The Bolivian Diary of Ernesto Che Guevara / Ernesto Che Guevara Editor Mary-Alice Waters, Publisher: Pathfinder Press (NY) (January 1, 1994), ISBN 0-87348-766-4, ISBN 978-0-87348-766-5
