= Revolutionary Party of the Workers of Bolivia =

Political party in Bolivia

The Revolutionary Party of the Workers of Bolivia (Spanish: Partido Revolucionario de los Trabajadores de Bolivia, PRTB) was a political party in Bolivia, formed in 1972 as the political wing of the National Liberation Army (ELN). PRTB later moved away from the foquismo line of ELN. PRTB published El proletario.

== Electoral alliances ==
In 1978, PRTB formed part of the Revolutionary Left Front. In the July 1979 elections, PRTB supported the Popular and Democratic Union.
