= Oscar Zamora (politician) =

Bolivian politician (1934–2017)

Oscar Daniel "Motete" Zamora Medinaceli (20 January 1934 – 17 November 2017) was a Bolivian politician and lawyer. A communist student activist in his youth and leader of a failed Maoist insurgency in the 1970s, Zamora went on to become a senator, minister, mayor, ambassador and prefect.

== Student activist ==
Zamora was born in Tarija, and entered politics through activism in the student movement. In 1951 he became the executive secretary of the Secondary School Students Federation of Tarija. Between 1954 and 1958 he served as the executive secretary of the Local University Federation of Tarija. He was also a founder and leader of the Communist Youth of Bolivia. In 1954 he became the founding chairman of the Tarija Civic Youth Committee. He became the executive secretary of the Bolivian University Confederation, a nationwide university students movement. Between 1961 and 1964 he was stationed in Prague, working at the office of the International Union of Students.

== Split in the Communist Party ==
During his tenure in Czechoslovakia, Zamora developed close links with the Chinese communists. Upon his return to Bolivia, he formed an oppositional faction inside the Communist Party of Bolivia along with Raúl Ruiz González and Luis Arratia. Zamora's group were expelled from the Communist Party in August 1964 during its second party congress. His followers founded the pro-Chinese Communist Party of Bolivia (Marxist-Leninist) (PCB-ML) in 1965, of which Zamora was the main leader.

== Che in Bolivia ==
Zamora had contacts with Che Guevara and Régis Debray during the 1960s. Zamora was part of the CODEP delegation (which also included Guillermo Lora and Lydia Gueiler) to the Latin American Solidarity Organization in Havana in January 1966, but which was expelled from Cuba. Nevertheless, contacts between Zamora and the Cubans continued. In the end PCB-ML- never offered any concrete support to Guevara's guerrilla effort. Zamora did, however, continue to defend Guevara's guerrilla struggle publicly. Zamora is harshly criticized by Fidel Castro in his preface to Guevara's Bolivian Diaries. The refusal of Zamora to support Guevara's initiative in 1967 remained a bone of contention between Maoists and Guevarists in Latin America for several years to come. Zamora wrote a lengthy rebuttal to Castro in 1968, in which he stated that Guevara himself had not accused the PCB-ML- of betrayal, that the party had discussed plans for an armed insurrection during a visit to Cuba in 1964, that it had been unaware of Guevara's arrival in Bolivia, and that Castro had aligned himself with the 'revisionists' during the 1964 Latin American conference of Communist Parties.

== UCAPO insurgency ==
Under the code-name 'Comandante Rolando' he led the irregular rebel group Poor Peasants Union (UCAPO), which began militant actions in the Santa Cruz region in 1970. UCAPO was able to integrate some structures of the National Liberation Army and regroup some of its members. Zamora was however captured, along with three other UCAPO militants, by Rangers following the seizure by UCAPO of the Chané ranch in 1970. The arsenal of the captured group included two revolvers and some Mao Zedong pamphlets. Zamora's capture was a severe blow for the underground PCB-ML. Soon after being detained, he was summarily deported to Argentina. He did however return to the country soon afterwards. In response to the failures of the UCAPO rebellion, Zamora later declared himself to be a 'social democrat' and a supporter of parliamentarism.

== Parliamentarian and Revolutionary Left Front leader ==
He later became the founding chairman of the Revolutionary Left Front (FRI). He was elected to the Senate of Bolivia several times; in 1979, 1982, 1989 and 1997 (during the latter period, his substitute was Raymundo Asseff Goméz). From 1986 to 1987 he served as the President of the Senate of Bolivia. He served as mayor of Tarija from 1987 to 1989, 1994 to 1996 and 1996 to 1997. He was the Bolivian Minister of Labor between 1989 and 1992.

In the 1993 presidential election Zamora was the vice-presidential candidate of Hugo Banzer. Zamora's candidature raised some eyebrows, not the least since it was under Banzer's command that he had gotten deported from the country during the UCAPO rebellion.

Zamora was candidate for mayor of Tarija in the 1999 municipal elections, and finished in third place with 16.64% of the votes.

== Later political career ==
Zamora was appointed Bolivian ambassador to China, but renounced his position in order to return to political life in Bolivia and stand as a candidate in the 2002 elections. During the early 2000s, he served as prefect of the Tarija Department for a period. He was elected to the Senate in 2002.

He was again candidate for mayor of Tarija in the 2004 municipal elections. Zamora finished second, with 13.8% of the votes.

In September 2005 he was elected head of the Tarija Parliamentarian Brigade.

He was elected to the Bolivian Constituent Assembly in 2006.

In September 2007 he suffered an emboli, and was forced to leave the Constituent Assembly.

== Family ==
Zamora is the uncle of Bolivian politician Jaime Paz Zamora. Zamora played an important role in shaping the political views of his nephew; for example he arranged for Paz Zamora to stay in Albania for six months during his university period in Europe. When Paz Zamora became president, he appointed Zamora as Minister of Labor.

== Death ==
Zamora suffered a stroke in August 2017, and remained in a coma for two months. The Senate of Bolivia paid tribute to him in September 2017. He died on 17 November 2017, in his home city of Tarija. The government of Tarija announced a 90-day mourning period after the news of his death broke. President Evo Morales expressed his condolences.
