= Emma Gutiérrez de Bedregal =

Bolivian politician

Emma Gutiérrez de Bedregal (1908–1977) was a Bolivian politician (Movimiento Nacionalista Revolucionario). She was a Member of Parliament between 1956 and 1958, and is known as the first women MP in Bolivia.

Emma Gutiérrez Aramayo was born 8 August 1908 in La Paz as the daughter of a rich landowner. In 1927 she married Daniel Bedregal Vera, who was an associate of Gualberto Villarroel López. Her spouse became an MP when his friend Gualberto Villarroel López became president in 1943.

On 20 July 1946 president Gualberto Villarroel was murdered. Her spouse Daniel Bedregal chose exile because he received threats as an ally of Villaroel. During his absence, Emma founded the women's support group “Comando Femenino”, also called “Comando Femenino del MNR”, for women who supported the Movimiento Nacionalista Revolucionario (MNR). She was also engaged in social work, such as combatting iliteracy among the indigenous people.

After the revolution of 9 April 1952, Víctor Paz Estenssoro became president. Women's suffrage in Bolivia was introduced in 1952, whch made it possible for women to be elected to Parliament for the first time. When Hernán Siles Zuazo of the MNR became president in 1956, she was nominated as MP in recognition for her support of the MNR. On 2 August 1956, Emma Gutiérrez Aramayo de Bedregal became the first female MP in Bolivia. She resigned in 1958.

She died in 1977.
