= Revolutionary Party of the National Left – Gueiler =

The Revolutionary Party of the National Left – Gueiler (Spanish: Partido Revolucionario de la Izquierda Nacional Gueiler, PRIN-G) was a small centrist political party in Bolivia.

The PRIN-G was established by a dissident fraction which broke away from the Revolutionary Party of the Nationalist Left in 1979. Led by Lidia Gueiler Tejada who served as interim Head of State from 16 November 1979, until her overthrow by the Luis García Meza Tejada coup of 17 July 1980.

In 1979 and 1980 the PRIN-G took part in an electoral coalition Revolutionary Nationalist Movement-Alliance backing Víctor Paz Estenssoro.
