= Eudoro Galindo =

Bolivian politician (1943–2019)

Senator for Cochabamba
- In office 2 August 1989 – 2 August 1993
- Substitute: Hilarión Rojas
- Preceded by: Mario Rolón
- Succeeded by: Juvenal Castro

Member of the Chamber of Deputies; from Cochabamba
- In office 2 August 1993 – 2 August 1997
- Substitute: Carlos Valverde
- Preceded by: Franklin Anaya
- Succeeded by: Franz Rivero
- Constituency: Party list
- In office 1 October 1982 – 3 August 1985
- Preceded by: Congress convened
- Succeeded by: Casiano Amurrio
- Constituency: Party list
- In office 1 August 1979 – 17 July 1980
- Preceded by: Congress convened
- Succeeded by: Congress dissolved
- Constituency: Party list

Personal details
- Born: Antonio Eudoro Galindo Anze; 14 June 1943 Cochabamba, Bolivia
- Died: 28 November 2019 (aged 76) Cochabamba, Bolivia
- Party: Bolivian Democratic (1986–1997); Nationalist Democratic Action (1979–1986)
- Relatives: Carlos Blanco Galindo
- Education: Texas A&M University
- Occupation: Business administrator; diplomat; politician

Antonio Eudoro Galindo Anze (14 June 1943 – 28 November 2019), often referred to as Chuso, was a Bolivian businessman, diplomat, and politician. A founding member of Nationalist Democratic Action and later the Bolivian Democratic Party, Galindo held a variety of parliamentary posts throughout the early years of the country's democratic transition. He served thrice as a party-list member of the Chamber of Deputies from Cochabamba from 1979 to 1980, 1982 to 1985, and 1993 to 1997, and was a senator for Cochabamba from 1989 to 1993. Galindo was former dictator Hugo Banzer's vice-presidential candidate in 1985, and he ran his own presidential campaign in 1997, failing to attain either position. Nearing the conclusion of his political career, Galindo served as ambassador to Japan from 1997 to 2002, after which point he largely retired from participating in partisan politics.

Raised in a well-to-do family from Cochabamba, Galindo spent much of his early life in political exile abroad. He graduated high school in Peru before completing college education in the United States, where he attended Texas A&M University in College Station, Texas. Upon his return to Bolivia, Galindo dedicated himself to entrepreneurial work in the private sector, holding executive positions at a variety of companies, including Intex and the Bolivian Center for Industrial Productivity. A staunch conservative with anti-communist tendencies, Galindo actively supported the right-wing military governments of the 1960s and '70s, particularly the near-decade-long dictatorship of Hugo Banzer. Following Banzer's fall from power, Galindo became a founding member and deputy leader of the general's party, Nationalist Democratic Action, with which he was elected to the Chamber of Deputies in 1979 and 1980. In 1985, Banzer designated him as his running mate. Though the pair won the popular vote, Galindo was denied the vice presidency by Congress. Shortly thereafter, he split with Banzer over the latter's decision to ally with the administration of Víctor Paz Estenssoro.

Expelled from Nationalist Democratic Action, Galindo founded his own front, the Bolivian Democratic Party. In 1989 and 1993, the party allied itself with the Revolutionary Nationalist Movement, bringing Galindo to the Senate and then back to the Chamber of Deputies. Following a failed attempt at being elected president of the lower chamber, Galindo was expelled from the Revolutionary Nationalist Movement. Forced to contest the 1997 general election on his own, Galindo launched a campaign for the presidency, which ended in defeat, as his party exited dead last and lost its registration. Having reconciled with Banzer, Galindo was appointed ambassador to Japan from 1997 to 2002, and though he sought to build a new party in 2004, it failed to gain significant traction. Distanced from political activity, Galindo remained active in the public sphere through the publication of books and opinion columns and his presence in local research associations. Hit by Parkinson's disease by his late 70s, he died in 2019, aged 76.

== Early life and education ==
Eudoro Galindo was born on 14 June 1943 in Cochabamba, the sixth of seven children born to Eudoro Galindo Quiroga and Blanca Anze Guzmán, an upper-class family of modest political influence. His father was a prominent member of Cochabamba civic society, whose influence rested on his participation in and financial support for public works and regional development projects across the city and surrounding department. At the height of the Galindo family's political power, Galindo Quiroga was a candidate for Senate on behalf of the conservative Republican Socialist Unity Party in the annulled 1951 general election. The Bolivian National Revolution that occurred just a year later and ensuing agrarian reform undermined much of that influence, with many members of the country's economic elite, including the Galindo family, seeking exile abroad.

Much of Galindo's early life and adolescence was spent during this period of political exile. He completed his secondary schooling in Peru, graduating from the La Salle School in Lima. Later, he traveled to the United States to pursue higher education, attending Texas A&M University in College Station, Texas, an institute nearly all the Galindo children attended at some point in time. There, he studied business administration specializing in international marketing, finally graduating with a degree in business as part of the Class of 1964. While in university, Galindo was also a member of the A&M Aggies Fencing Club Team and additionally served in the Corps of Cadets, with which he completed a short term of military service in Vietnam.

== Businessman and socialite ==
Shortly after graduating, Galindo returned to Bolivia, where he dedicated himself to commercial activities within the private sector. His first job was as a junior marketing consultant for the Bolivian Center for Industrial Productivity, a company he quickly rose to manage in 1965. The following year, he was appointed deputy manager of Intex, the national hosiery corporation, a post he held until 1970 when he assumed as the enterprise's administrative manager. During this time, he also served as director of the Cochabamba Chamber of Industry and spent short stints managing limited companies, including the S.A.s Industrias Textiles and Inversiones Generales.

An avid athlete, Galindo was adept in multiple athletic disciplines, including karate, as well as swimming and cycling. He served as president of the departmental associations of swimming and cycling and founded his own rudimentary bicycle factory in 1967, the basis of which became the headquarters of CALOI Bicycles in Bolivia, which he served as executive president of from 1972 to 1979. Galindo's primary discipline, however, was fencing. He was a three-time national fencing champion, served as president of the Bolivian Fencing Federation, and represented Bolivia at the 1970 Maracaibo and 1973 Panama City Bolivarian Games, finishing twice as a bronze medalist. For the 1977 Bolivarian Games hosted in Bolivia, Galindo was selected to chair the Departmental Committee for Sports Infrastructure in Cochabamba, during which time he oversaw the construction and remodeling of the city's major stadiums and sports fields.

== Early political activism ==
As with many members of Bolivia's well-to-do business community, Galindo was a tacit, if not outspoken, supporter of the conservative military governments that ruled the country in the 1960s and '70s. A virulent anti-communist, by the tail end of the 1960s, Galindo had grown weary of what he viewed as "heavy communist presence" in Cochabamba and—as recounted by his brother, Ramiro—"[had] formed his own secret society ... to clandestinely offer public signs of displeasure." Initially limited to discreet acts of protest such as small-scale vandalism and graffiti, Galindo's activism took a sharp turn towards the radical around the time of the death of René Barrientos and the rise of leftist general Juan José Torres to the presidency. Together with a group of likeminded Brazilian emigres he had met in the entrepreneurial world, Galindo "pretty well abandoned [his] business and went almost full time into forming alliances with non-leftist Armed Forces officers and anti-communist militias."

The culmination of these machinations came in January 1971 when rightist cells in the country's three largest cities—Cochabamba, La Paz, and Santa Cruz—set in motion a coordinated coup d'état against the Torres regime. Although Galindo's cell succeeded in taking major military and police installations in Cochabamba, similar operations led by Edmundo Valencia in La Paz and Hugo Banzer in Santa Cruz were foiled, causing the plot to fall apart. Their forces scattered, Galindo took refuge in his brother's attic but was quickly discovered and taken into custody. He ultimately spent only a few weeks in detention in La Paz before his parents were able to successfully maneuver their influence to procure him a commuted sentence, to be spent in exile in Houston, Texas.

== Political career ==
=== Foundation of ADN ===
Galindo's stint back in the US proved short, as within a few months of the botched January coup, a second putsch spearheaded by Banzer succeeded in toppling the Torres regime, allowing Galindo to return to Bolivia. Despite holding some minor positions in the state apparatus during Banzer's near-decade-long dictatorship—including serving as Cochabamba's delegate to the National Directorate of Youths in 1975—Galindo, for the most part, returned to his career in business. His first foray into politics did not occur until after the fall of the Banzer regime, during the country's democratic reopening. In March 1979, he became one of the principal architects and founding members of Nationalist Democratic Action (ADN), a self-described "great party of the Bolivian right" designed to revitalize Banzer's public image from that of an authoritarian with only "'an inkling' of what democracy implied" into a civilian leader capable of "play[ing] the democratic game."

As the party's deputy leader, Galindo composed part of ADN's pro-business wing and, according to sociologist Salvador Romero, was integral in helping give it "an identity committed to the interests of the economic elite." Indeed, throughout his tenure in leadership, Galindo became characterized by his "tough anti-union stance," pledging to "apply the law" against trade unions organizing general strikes and calling for the closure of state-run enterprises, such as the partly-worker-managed Bolivian Mining Corporation. Ideologically, Galindo's disposition and political stances drew mixed readings. Some sources regard him as having represented the "hardline right-wing sectors in the party," with his—as described by James Dunkerley—"thuggery" drawing comparisons to El Salvador's Roberto D'Aubuisson. For figures like Romero, however, "Galindo belonged to [ADN's] liberal and modernizing current, as opposed to a more conservative side."

=== First congressional terms ===
Within just a few months of its foundation, ADN contested its first general election, in which Galindo was elected to represent Cochabamba in the Chamber of Deputies. As with most members of the 1979–1980 Congress, his short first term proved unproductive, as the hung parliament produced by the 1979 elections found itself incapable of governing—or even selecting a president. To resolve the impasse, snap general elections were held in 1980, in which Galindo again won a seat in the lower chamber. Ultimately, however, he and all other members-elect were prevented from assuming office by the coup d'état of Luis García Meza, which shut down the previous legislature.

For ADN, the military's 1980 return to power created a point of contention between members who wished to collaborate with the new regime and those unwilling to do so. Recalling the period to Los Tiempos, Galindo stated: "there were those [in ADN] who believed that we had to be the political arm of the Armed Forces and others, like me, who believed that we should not interfere." Galindo composed the core group of ADN leaders—including Banzer—who "rejected any collaboration," even as other prominent members were given "special permission" to take up ministerial posts within García Meza's cabinet. Over the course of the ensuing year, Galindo participated in two attempted countercoups against the García Meza regime, both of which failed, forcing him into hiding until after the fall of the general's military government. In 1982, following the Armed Forces' decision to step down and hand the reins of government to the Congress elected in 1980, Galindo and his colleagues returned to parliament.

=== 1985 vice-presidential campaign ===
Nearing the conclusion of his parliamentary term, Galindo shifted focus towards the campaign trail as he again prepared to contest another election. With the campaign underway for the 1985 general election, Galindo was tapped to accompany Banzer as his running mate, a significant step up in his political career. Bolstered by rampant hyperinflation and widespread discontent with the incumbent left-wing government, the Banzer-Galindo ticket seemed poised to cruise to victory. Those prospects dampened somewhat midway through the campaign, as Galindo faced controversy for allegedly falsifying his military service records, claiming to have received a libreta militar—a prerequisite for holding public office—despite having never served in the Bolivian Armed Forces. Faced with a petition on the part of military high command to disqualify his candidacy, Galindo accused the Armed Forces of seeking to postpone the elections, even alleging that they were plotting a coup in conjunction with left-wing trade syndicates. Ultimately, the scandal over Galindo's military service failed to substantially damage Banzer's campaign, and the pair exited first on election day with an over thirty percent popular vote plurality.

=== Split with ADN and formation of PDB ===
Having failed to win the popular vote outright, the decision to appoint a new president and vice president was handed over to the newly-elected Congress. In a move unprecedented in Bolivian history at the time, Banzer and Galindo were denied control of the executive branch, as the opposition-led legislature instead selected runner-up Víctor Paz Estenssoro to hold the presidency. For his part, Banzer brushed aside any animosity over the snub and quickly moved to enter a coalition agreement with Paz Estenssoro's government. Galindo, on the other hand, was not as keen on cooperating with the new administration, labeling any notion of collaboration with Paz Estenssoro's Revolutionary Nationalist Movement (MNR) as "dangerous". Speaking to the Latin American Weekly Report, Galindo affirmed that "[ADN] will not make any deals ... If this means we cannot be the government, we would rather go into opposition." Ultimately, Galindo's discontent with the 1986 "Pact for Democracy"—reached between Banzer and Paz Estenssoro to jointly combat the ongoing financial crisis—provoked a significant fracture in the ranks of ADN, with Galindo resigning from leadership in protest.

Following a failed leadership challenge against Banzer, Galindo and his congressional collaborators were expelled from ADN and labeled "fascists" by the party. With that, Galindo quickly moved to form his own party, dubbed the Nationalist Democratic Front, later renamed to the Bolivian Democratic Party (PDB). By 1987, the new party had absorbed a significant portion of ADN's parliamentary caucus, with at least ten adenistas, including all deputies from Cochabamba, Potosí, and Tarija, joining the PDB's ranks. Amid a public spat between the two figures, Banzer termed Galindo "an unknown," while Galindo reneged on his previous support for the general's 1970s military regime, to the point that he even reopened an inquiry into human rights violations committed by his government.

=== Later congressional terms ===
Given the circumstances of his departure from ADN, it is paradoxical, then, that Galindo's PDB ultimately opted to align itself with the MNR to contest the 1989 general election. For Romero, Galindo's apparent reversal illustrated the MNR's "shift towards [neo]liberalism and enthusiasm for the elite" under the leadership of Paz Estenssoro's successor, Gonzalo Sánchez de Lozada. As part of his alliance with the MNR, Galindo was elected to represent Cochabamba in the Senate from 1989 to 1993, after which he returned to the Chamber of Deputies in 1993. Midway through his term, however, Galindo's pact with the MNR came to a sudden halt after he challenged the party's chosen candidate, Guillermo Bedregal, for the presidency of the lower chamber. In a dramatic August 1995 session, Galindo managed to unite the votes of opposition legislators from both the left and right, nearly defeating Bedregal in the process. The near-victory, according to Romero, was "surprising ... since the discipline of the parties [usually made] the election of the chambers' directorates predictable." In retaliation for the failed coup, Galindo was expelled from the MNR "for treachery against the party."

=== 1997 presidential campaign and retirement ===
Having eroded trust between himself and the country's two top political leaders, Galindo launched his own presidential bid in the 1997 general election. Faced with the PDB's small partisan base, Galindo's campaign sought out the aid of other politicians who had been marginalized from their fronts, including them on his party's slate of parliamentary candidates. The strategy failed to significantly drum up support for his candidacy, and he exited dead last on election day, taking less than a percent of the national popular vote, a margin too small even for his PDB to keep its registration as a political party.

Following his 1997 loss, Galindo initiated a gradual rapprochement with the now-president Banzer, who designated him as the country's ambassador to Japan. He maintained the position for the duration of Banzer's term before being dismissed in 2002. After that, Galindo again sought to construct his own political project, forming Molle in 2004, which contested that year's municipal election in the city of Cochabamba. The party's poor electoral showing marked the end of Galindo's political career, and he retired from active participation in politics from then on.

== Later life and death ==
Although distanced from political activity following his 2004 electoral loss, Galindo remained active in the public sphere through the frequent publication of opinion columns and political analysis, taking a stance critical to the emergent Movement for Socialism. Having previously dabbled in education as a founding member and the first director of the Higher University of San Simón's school of business administration, he became more active in academia in his later years, publishing multiple political studies and historical works. He served as a member of the Cochabamba Military History Research Institute and was president of the Cochabamba Society of Genealogy and History. Wracked by Parkinson's disease by his late 70s, he died in Cochabamba on 28 November 2019, aged 76.

== Electoral history ==
Electoral history of Eudoro Galindo
Year	Office	Party	Alliance	Votes			Result	Ref.
Year	Office	Party	Alliance	Total	%	P.	Result	Ref.
1979	Deputy	Nationalist Democratic Action		42,983	18.56%	3rd (Note: Presented on an electoral list. The data shown represents the share of the vote the entire party/alliance received in that constituency.)	Won	
1980	Deputy	Nationalist Democratic Action		36,073	18.84%	2nd	Won	
1985	Vice president	Nationalist Democratic Action		493,735	32.83%	1st	Lost	
1989	Senator	Bolivian Democratic	Revolutionary Nationalist Movement	57,908	26.16%	1st	Won	
1993	Deputy	Bolivian Democratic	MNR-MRTKL	96,752	40.46%	1st	Won	
1997	President	Bolivian Democratic		10,381	0.48%	10th	Lost	
Source: Plurinational Electoral Organ | Electoral Atlas

== Publications ==
- Galindo Anze, Eudoro (1985). Bolivia, Otro Camino: Notas y Documentos Políticos (in Spanish). La Paz: Editorial Los Amigos del Libro. OCLC 13041167.
- —————————— (1994). El Fracaso del "Presidencialismo": Causa Principal de una Tragedia Histórica (in Spanish). La Paz: Fundación Hanns-Seidel; Fundación Boliviana para la Capacitación Democrática y la Investigación. OCLC 32513253.
- —————————— (1995). Sucre: Una Antología (in Spanish). La Paz: Grupo Editorial Kipus. ASIN B007A0BXUY. OCLC 32697938.
- —————————— (1996). El Sueño Truncado: 1825–1828 (in Spanish). Cochabamba: Grupo Editorial Kipus. OCLC 36618239.
- —————————— (2011). Fidel Castro, el Legado Maligno: Despotismo y Dictadura en Latinoamérica (in Spanish). Cochabamba: Casa de Tharsis. ASIN B0849W887S. OCLC 796082612.
- —————————— (2017). Relatos del Antiguo Solar en la Plaza de las Palmeras (in Spanish). Cochabamba: Grupo Editorial Kipus. ISBN 978-99974-66-90-7. OCLC 1034915090.

Chamber of Deputies of Bolivia
Congress convened	Member of the Chamber of Deputies from Cochabamba; 1979–1980	Congress dissolved
Congress convened	Member of the Chamber of Deputies from Cochabamba; 1982–1985	Succeeded by Casiano Amurrio
Preceded by Franklin Anaya	Member of the Chamber of Deputies from Cochabamba; 1993–1997	Succeeded by Franz Rivero
Senate of Bolivia
Preceded by Mario Rolón	Senator for Cochabamba; 1989–1993; Served alongside: Germán Lema, Lidia Gueiler	Succeeded by Juvenal Castro
