= Revolutionary Agrarian Movement of the Bolivian Peasantry =

The Revolutionary Agrarian Movement of the Bolivian Peasantry (Spanish: Movimiento Agrario Revolucionario del Campesinado Boliviano, MARC) was a right-wing Christian nationalist movement in Bolivia.

The Revolutionary Agrarian Movement of the Bolivian Peasantry was established by General René Bernal Escalante and José Zegarra Cerruto among the Cochabamba campesinos in June 1978.

In 1978 the MARC took part in an electoral coalition Popular Alliance for National Integration backing René Bernal Escalante as the presidential candidate and Mario Gutiérrez Gutiérrez (FSB) as the vice-presidential candidate.

After the coup d'état on 17 July 1980 the Revolutionary Agrarian Movement of the Bolivian Peasantry disappeared.
