= Revolutionary Nationalist Movement – Julio =

The Revolutionary Nationalist Movement–Julio (Spanish: Movimiento Nacionalista Revolu-Julio, MNR-J) was a pro-military political party in Bolivia.

In 1971, the Revolutionary Nationalist Movement supported the far-Right coup triggered by Colonel Hugo Banzer Suárez, and the Party became officially a member of the regime, along with the party's traditional enemy, the Bolivian Socialist Falange. Víctor Paz Estenssoro, meanwhile, had difficulties in maintaining discipline over his own followers. When he and the military differed so sharply over policy in 1973 that he sought to withdraw the MNR representatives from the cabinet, a part of the politicians refused to leave office. This group continued to cooperate with the regime.

They split from the Revolutionary Nationalist Movement and founded the Revolutionary Nationalist Movement–Julio. Led by Rubén Julio Castro.

In 1978 the MNR-J took part in an electoral coalition Nationalist Union of the People backing General Juan Pereda Asbún.

In 1979 elections the MNR-J allied with the Nationalist Democratic Action and its candidate Hugo Banzer Suárez.

In 1980 the part of MNR-J reintegrated with historical Revolutionary Nationalist Movement led by Víctor Paz Estenssoro, the second fraction dissolved into Banzer's Nationalist Democratic Action.
