= Popular Alliance for National Integration =

The Popular Alliance for National Integration (Spanish: Alianza Popular de Integración Nacional, APIN) was a right-wing electoral political alliance in Bolivia.

The APIN was formed in 1979 by:

- Revolutionary Agrarian Movement of the Bolivian Peasantry, MARC
- Bolivian Socialist Falange, FSB (faction led by Mario Gutiérrez Gutiérrez)
- Christian Democratic Union, UDC

In 1979 presented as its presidential candidate René Bernal Escalante (MARC) and Mario Gutiérrez Gutiérrez (FSB) as vice-presidential candidate.
