= Lidia Gueiler =

President of Bolivia from 1979 to 1980

Lydia Gueiler OB OCA OL
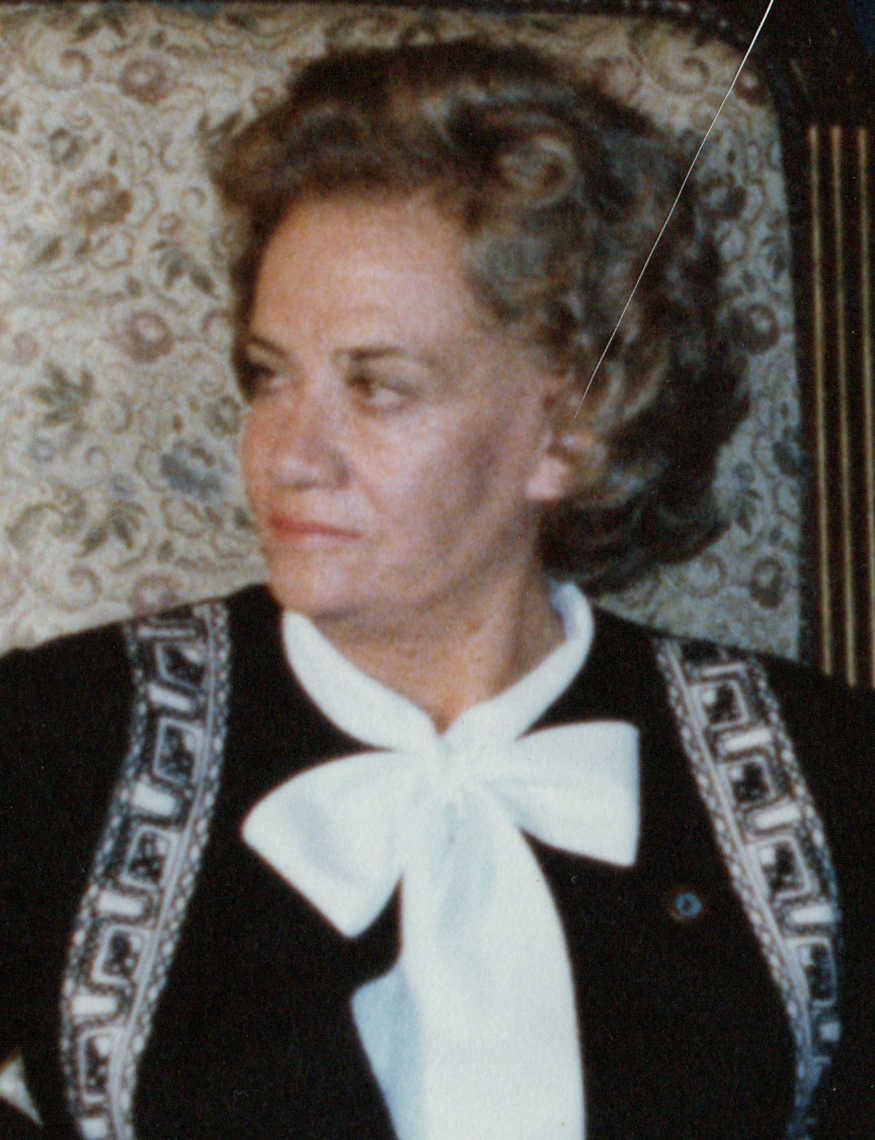
- Lidia Gueiler in 1980

56th President of Bolivia
- Acting (Note: Gueiler was officially referred to as acting president but, in reality, her government was provisional in nature.)
- In office 16 November 1979 – 17 July 1980
- Vice President: Vacant
- Preceded by: Alberto Natusch
- Succeeded by: Luis García Meza

President of the Chamber of Deputies
- In office 4 August 1979 – 16 November 1979
- Preceded by: Jorge Ríos
- Succeeded by: José Zegarra
Parliamentary offices
Senator for Cochabamba
In office 2 August 1989 – 2 August 1993
Substitute	Medardo Navia
Preceded by	Gonzalo Sánchez de Lozada
Succeeded by	Joaquín Aguirre
Member of the Chamber of Deputies from Cochabamba
In office 1 August 1979 – 16 November 1979
Constituency	Party list
Member of the Chamber of Deputies from La Paz
In office August 1962 – August 1964
Constituency	Party list
Substitute; August 1956 – August 1958
Deputy	Emma Gutiérrez
Constituency	Party list

Personal details
- Born: Lydia Gueiler Tejada; 28 August 1921 Cochabamba, Bolivia
- Died: 9 May 2011 (aged 89) La Paz, Bolivia
- Party: Revolutionary Party of the National Left (1963–1979)
- Other political affiliations: Revolutionary Nationalist Movement (before 1963); Revolutionary Party of the National Left – Gueiler (1979–1980); Revolutionary Left Movement (1989–1993)
- Spouses: Mareirian Pérez Ramírez (m. 1936; sep. 1941); Edwin Möller Paccieri (divorced)
- Parents: Moisés Gueiler Grunewelt; Raquel Tejada Albornoz
- Relatives: Luis Eduardo Siles (grandson); Raquel Welch (third cousin); José Luis Tejada Sorzano; Luis García Meza

Lydia Gueiler Tejada (Note: In this Spanish name, the first or paternal surname is Gueiler and the second or maternal family name is Tejada. Gueiler's given name Lydia is often misrendered as Lidia.) (28 August 1921 – 9 May 2011) was a Bolivian politician who served as the 56th president of Bolivia from 1979 to 1980. She was one of the first female republican heads of state and the first woman to serve as president of Bolivia.

== Background and earlier career ==
Gueiler was born in Cochabamba, to Moisés Gueiler Grunewelt, an immigrant from Germany and a Bolivian mother, Raquel Tejada Albornoz. She received a BA degree from Instituto Americano in Cochabamba. In the 1940s, she joined the Movimiento Nacionalista Revolucionario (MNR). When that party came to power as a result of the 1952 National Revolution, Gueiler became a member of the Congress of Bolivia, serving in that capacity from 1956 until 1964. In 1964, she went into exile abroad after the MNR was toppled from power by generals Barrientos and Ovando. She spent the next fifteen years out of the country, and joined Juan Lechín's Revolutionary Party of the Nationalist Left (PRIN).

She also became the vice-president of the Revolutionary Left Front.

Upon returning to Bolivia in 1979, Gueiler again ran for Congress and was elected President of the Chamber of Deputies of Bolivia (the lower house of the Bolivian Congress) as part of the MNR alliance of former president Víctor Paz Estenssoro.

As no presidential candidate in the 1979 elections had received the necessary 50% of the vote, it fell to Congress to decide who should be president. Surprisingly, no agreement could be reached, no matter how many votes were taken. An alternative was offered in the form of the President of the Senate of Bolivia, Dr. Wálter Guevara, who was named temporary Bolivian President in August 1979 pending the calling of new elections in 1980. Guevara was shortly afterwards overthrown in a military coup led by General Alberto Natusch. The population resisted, however, led by a nationwide labor strike called by the powerful Central Obrera Boliviana ("COB") of Juan Lechín. In the end, Natusch was able to occupy the Palacio Quemado for only sixteen days, after which he was forced to give up power. The only face-saving concession he extracted from Congress was the promise that Guevara not be allowed to resume his duties as president.

== Interim President of Bolivia ==
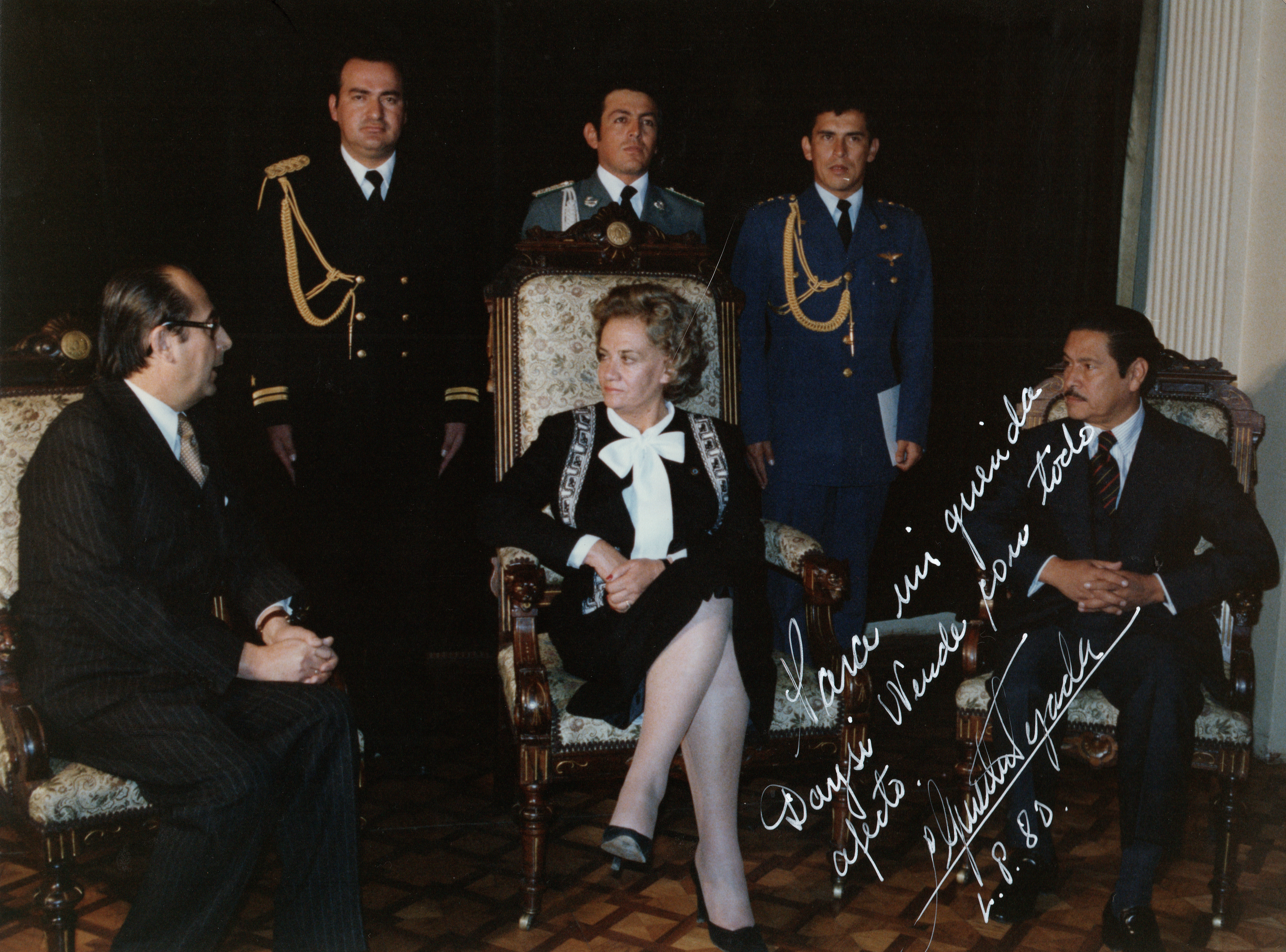
Gueiler in an autographed photo from 1980

The above condition was accepted and a new provisional president was found in Lydia Gueiler, then leader of the lower congressional house.

As interim President, Gueiler was entrusted with the task of conducting new elections, which were held on 29 June 1980.

=== Overthrown by Bolivian Armed Forces in 1980 ===
Before the winners could take their parliamentary seats, however, Gueiler herself was overthrown by the Bolivian Armed Forces in coup by her cousin, General Luis García Meza Tejada in 1980. Despite being backed by both the Soviet Union and the United States, her cousin was supported by Argentina, Brazil and Peru. Gueiler subsequently left the country, and lived in France until the fall of the dictatorship in 1982.

== Later diplomatic and other activities ==
Later, she served her country mostly in the diplomatic sphere, having been appointed Bolivia's ambassador to first Colombia, then West Germany, and finally—after joining Jaime Paz's "Movimiento de Izquierda Revolucionaria"—to Venezuela (1989). She retired from public life in the mid-1990s.

Gueiler was involved in various Bolivian feminist organizations throughout her life. She opposed the United States-backed war on drugs in Latin America, particularly the so-called Plan Colombia. In addition, she authored two books, publishing La mujer y la revolución ("The woman and the revolution") in 1960 and her autobiography, Mi pasión de lideresa ("My passion as a leader"), in 2000. She supported the candidacy of Evo Morales in the 2005 election.

In June 2009, Gueiler accepted the role of honorary president of the Human Rights Foundation in Bolivia.

She is the recipient of several awards, including the Order of the Condor of the Andes Grand Cross and the 1979 United Nations Woman of the Year award.

== Death ==
On 9 May 2011, Gueiler died in La Paz following a long illness. She was 89 years old.

== See also ==
- Cabinet of Lydia Gueiler

Political offices
Vacant Title last held by Jorge Ríos Gamarra	President of the Chamber of Deputies; 1979	Succeeded by José Zegarra Cerruto
Preceded by Alberto Natusch	President of Bolivia; Interim; 1979–1980	Succeeded by Luis García Meza
