= People's Revolutionary Front (Marxist−Leninist−Maoist) =

Bolivian communist party

The People's Revolutionary Front (Marxist–Leninist–Maoist) (Spanish: Frente Revolucionario del Pueblo (Marxista–Leninista–Maoísta)) is a Bolivian communist party of the Marxist–Leninist–Maoist orientation. They are ideologically close to the Communist Party of Peru.

They are opposed to the Evo Morales government and aspire to conduct what they deem as "People's War" in their homeland, similar to the conflicts in India, Peru, the Philippines and formerly Nepal. They are closely aligned to the Revolutionary Internationalist Movement.

== Political Platform ==
The People's Revolutionary Front lays out its political platform in eight points.

1. The establishment of a People's Democratic Republic, reflecting the joint dictatorship of workers and peasants, led by the Communist Party, and bring together the progressive petty-bourgeoisie, as well as the middle (or national) bourgeoisie.
2. The Democratic Revolution of a new type, led by the Communist Party, aims toward the overthrowing of the three mountains that oppress our people: Imperialism, mainly Yankee, but also Russian, Chinese, or the imperialism of any other power who are responsible for the semi-colonial status of our country; non-State bureaucrat-capitalism, represented by the big industrial and financial bourgeoisie; and semi-feudalism, which oppresses the masses of the countryside via the big landowners.
3. The destruction of the old bureaucrat-landowner State, its institutions, and its murderous armed forces, and the construction of a New Democratic State, sustained by New Power on the basis of the revolutionary armed forces in service of the proletariat and the people.
4. The destruction of the old State and the construction of a new one, as the principal aspect, can only occur under the command of Marxism–Leninism-Maoism and its guiding thought, via the development of a protracted People's War led by the militarized Communist Party, and having applied concentric construction of the three instruments of the Revolution. In the specific case of our country, the People's War will follow the path of the encirclement of the cities from the countryside.
5. Regarding the Democratic Revolution of a new type and future revolutions: Socialist Revolution will proceed uninterruptedly to Communism through Cultural Revolutions. It cannot develop without the leadership of the Communist Party to guide its course. The Revolution necessarily generates a Great Leadership and a Guiding Thought that directs it.
6. We conceive of the Democratic Revolution in Bolivia as part of the World Proletarian Revolution, as a detachment of the struggle of the international proletariat in its objective of establishing Communism across the globe. Once the People's Republic of Bolivia is established, it will become a support base for the World Proletarian Revolution.
7. To fight consistently for the emancipation of women. Unleash their revolutionary fury and incorporate them into the New Democratic Revolution by combating patriarchy in addition to bourgeois and feudal exploitation.
8. To defend the democratic rights of the people – fundamentally the right to rebel – as well as the workers’ conquests achieved in the struggles for demands at every level, and the rights of the peoples oppressed by the bureaucrat-landowner State.

== See also ==
- Communist Party of Ecuador–Red Sun
- Revolutionary Communist Party of Argentina
- Revolutionary Communist Group of Colombia
