= Center for the Study of Natural Resources =

Bolivian environmental organisation

The Center for the Study of Natural Resources (Spanish: Centro de Estudios de los Recursos Naturales, CERNA) was a Bolivian environmental organization. It was an arm of the prodemocracy movement that opposed policies encouraging foreign ownership of Bolivian resources.

The CERNA was founded by Carlos Brockmann, Jose Lorini, and Guido Capra Gemio in the 1970s.

In 1978, 1979 and 1980 the CERNA took part in an electoral coalition Democratic and Popular Union backing Hernán Siles Zuazo.
