= Óscar Salas Moya =

Bolivia politician

Óscar Salas Moya (August 5, 1936 in Oruro – February 23, 2017) was a Bolivian politician and trade unionist. A miner by profession, Salas Moya was a key leader of the Communist Party of Bolivia and a leader of the Huanuni miners union. The position of Salas Moya, then belonging to a younger generation in the party leadership, was strengthened in 1964, after the party had been deserted by Pimentel and Escóbar.

Salas Moya became a parliamentarian in 1979 and 1980–1985. In 1985 he was the vice-presidential candidate of the United People's Front (whose presidential candidate was Antonio Araníbar Quiroga). The Araníbar-Salas candidature obtained 38,124 votes (2.84% of the national vote).

In 1991 he broke with the Communist Party and founded a new party, the Democratic Socialist Alternative (ASD). Salas Moya became the first president of the new party.

In 1992 Salas Moya was elected as the Executive Secretary of the main trade union centre in the country, Central Obrera Boliviana (COB), at its ninth congress. Salas Moya's candidature was supported a coalition of various moderate elements and opposed by the militant miners' union (who walked out in protest after the election). As the leader of COB, he was also the president of the Andean Consultative Labour Council 1993–1995. Salas Moya served as COB Executive Secretary until 1996.

In 1997 he returned to parliament, elected to the Chamber of Deputies from Oruro through proportional representation on a Revolutionary Left Movement (MIR) list. Salas Moya was the sole ASD parliamentarian. His alternate in the parliament was Franz Delgado Koriyama.

He died on February 23, 2017, at the age of 84.
