= Jorge Kolle =

Bolivian politician (1930–2007)

Jorge Kolle Cueto (20 April 1930 – 4 March 2007) was a Bolivian communist politician. Kolle was one of the founding members of the Communist Party of Bolivia in 1950. He held the position of First Secretary of the party and edited the central party organ, Unidad. He also had an influence in the miners and factory workers trade union movement. Kolle was a senator from 1982 to 1985.
