= Organization of Revolutionary Unity =

Bolivian political party

The Organization of Revolutionary Unity (Spanish: Organización de Unidad Revolucionaria, OUR or ODEUR) was a small left-wing political party in Bolivia.

The Organization of Revolutionary Unity was established in December 1977. It was led by Mario Lanza Suárez. Founded as a democratic and revolutionary political force with the object of promoting and co-operating in the Bolivian revolution "interrupted by various military governments for more than 20 years", it intended to be a national liberation movement based on peasants and workers, but without any international ties. The OUR advocated for industrial development, the rehabilitation of public and state enterprises and increased investment and production.

In 1978, 1979, and 1980 the OUR took part in an electoral coalition Democratic and Popular Union backing Hernán Siles Zuazo.
