= Communist Party of Bolivia (Marxist–Leninist) =

The Communist Party of Bolivia (Marxist–Leninist) (Spanish: Partido Comunista de Bolivia (marxista-leninista), PCB (ML)) was a political party in Bolivia. PCB (ML) emerged as a pro-People's Republic of China splinter group of the Communist Party of Bolivia in 1965. PCB (ML) was led by Óscar Zamora.

In 1978, PCB (ML) founded the Revolutionary Left Front (FRI) as an open mass front. In the parliamentary elections of 1978, the FRI won 1.2% of the votes. In subsequent elections FRI was a candidate in alliances with MNR, MIR and ADN. Later, FRI became a social democratic party.

The central press organ of PCB (ML) was Liberación.

Today, PCB (ML) no longer exists although FRI has continued.

== See also ==
- Communist Party of Bolivia - Marxist Leninist Maoist
- People's Revolutionary Front (Marxist−Leninist−Maoist)
