= Communist Party of Bolivia =

Political party in Bolivia

Communist Party of Bolivia Partido Comunista de Bolivia
- Founded: 17 January 1950
- Split from: Revolutionary Left Party
- Ideology: Communism; Marxism–Leninism
- Political position: Far-left
- Regional affiliation: São Paulo Forum
- International affiliation: IMCWP; World Anti-Imperialist Platform
- Chamber of Deputies: 0 / 130
- Senate: 0 / 36

Website
- partidocomunistadebolivia.com.bo

The Communist Party of Bolivia (Spanish: Partido Comunista de Bolivia) is a Marxist-Leninist party in Bolivia. It was founded in 1950 by Raúl Ruiz González and other former members of the Revolutionary Left Party (PIR). It remained small and did not hold its first national party congress until 1959.

It soon entered the labor movement and was included in the leadership of the Central Obrera Boliviana and the FSTMB during the 1960s. However, it remained a minority force in most unions. The Sino-Soviet split further weakened the PCB. In 1964, Ruiz González and others broke away to form the pro-China Communist Party of Bolivia (Marxist–Leninist).

At the time, the U.S. State Department estimated the party membership to be approximately 6,500.

In 1966, the Cuban-based revolutionary Che Guevara planned to initiate a guerrilla war against René Barrientos, Bolivia's military dictator. The PCB initially pledged its support, but became suspicious of Guevara when he arrived. The party did not participate in Guevara's campaign. Instead, Guevara formed a separate organization, the National Liberation Army (Ejército de Liberación Nacional).

When democracy was restored in Bolivia in the 1980s, the PCB remained a minor party. In 2005 it lost its designation as a recognized political party. The party is still active and led by Ignacio Mendoza, supporting international solidarity towards the leftist governments of Cuba and Venezuela.

The PCB publishes Unidad (Unity).

== General Secretaries ==
- Simón Reyes Rivera (1950–c. 1967)
- Mario Monje Molina, nicknamed "Estanislao" (c. 1967–c. 1970)
- Jorge Kolle Cueto (c. 1970–1981)
- Marcos Domich Ruiz (1985–2003)
- Ignacio Mendoza Pizarro (Since 2003)
