= Heide–Karolinenkoog railway =

Former railway line in Germany

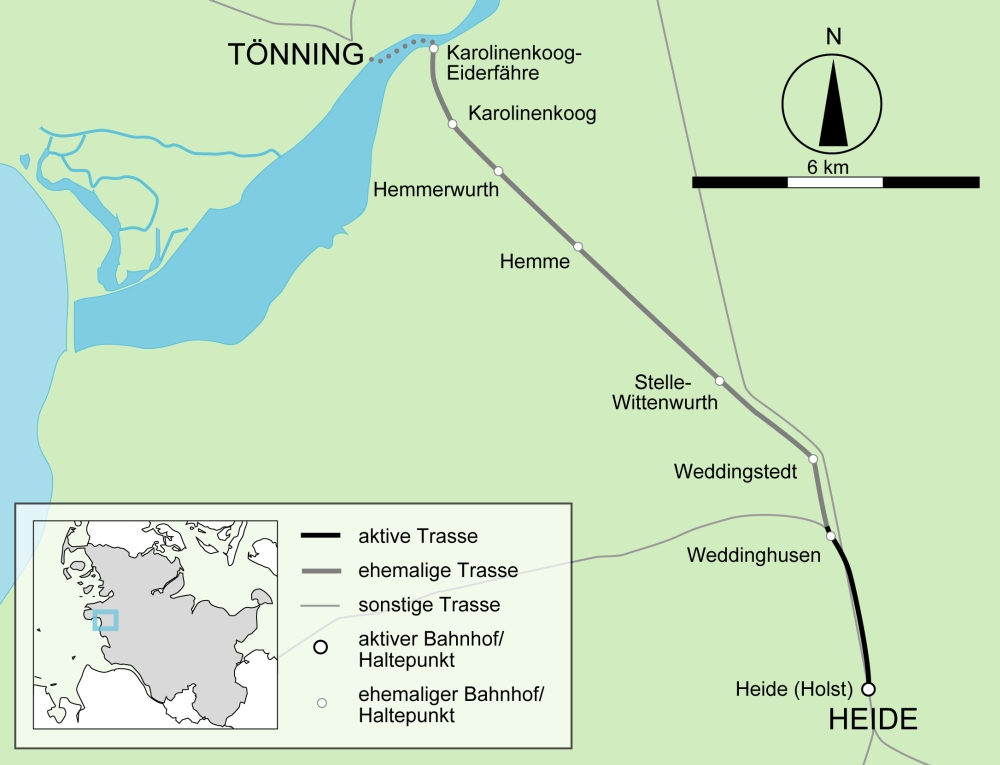

Overview
- Line number: 1207 (Germany)
- Locale: Schleswig-Holstein, Germany

Service
- Route number: 112f (1944)

Technical
- Line length: 16.9 km (10.5 mi)
- Track gauge: 1,435 mm (4 ft 8 1/2 in) standard gauge

The Heide–Karolinenkoog railway was a now closed line in the Dithmarschen district in the German state of Schleswig-Holstein, connecting the district seat of Heide via Weddingstedt with the ferry over the Eider in Karolinenkoog. A section of the line north of Heide, a few kilometres long, is now part of the Heide–Büsum railway.

== Geography ==
The line runs branched off from the Marsh Railway in Heide station and later passed under it. In Karolinenkoog there was a steam ferry port to Tonning. In satellite images the line can still be clearly seen because in followed a dead straight path. The route of a section of the line is now used by part of federal highway 5 running between the end of Autobahn 23 at Heide-West via Hemme to the Eider bridge at Tönning.

== Operations and history ==
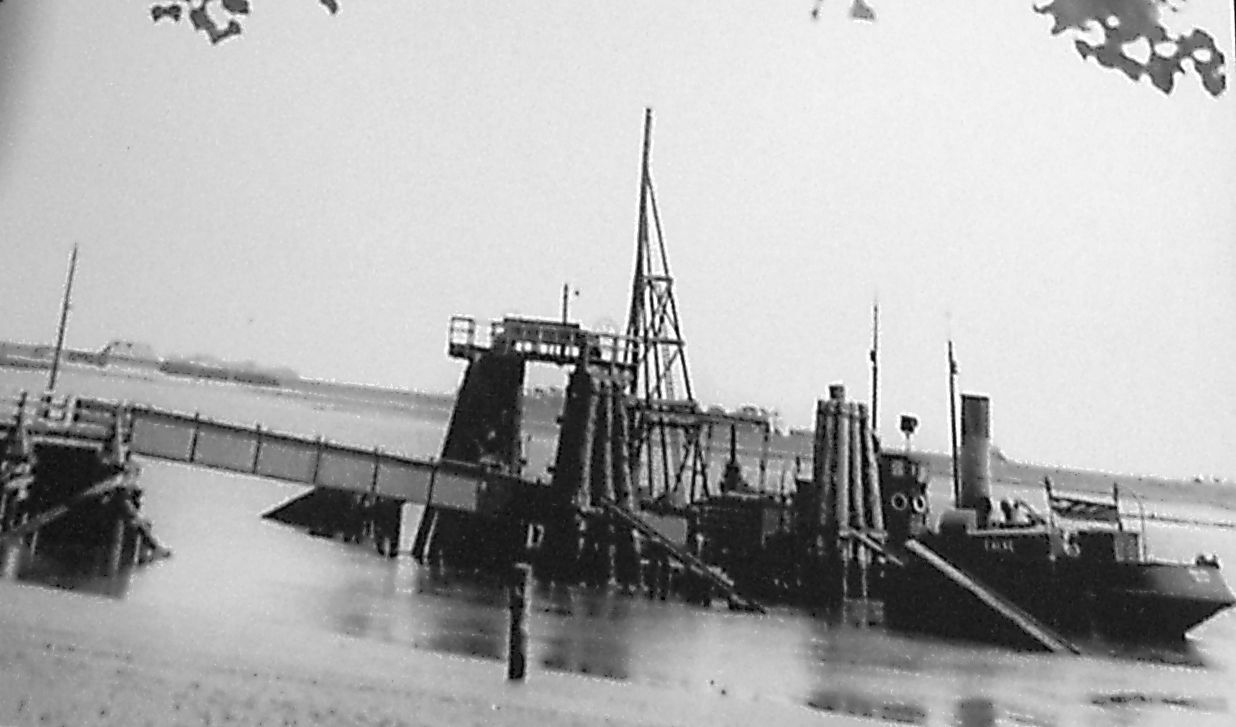
The Eider ferry, which connected to Tönning

The Heide–Karolinenkoog railway was opened, together with the Neumünster–Heide railway, on 22 August 1877. It was built and operated by the West Holstein Railway Company (Westholsteinische Eisenbahn-Gesellschaft).

The Wesselburen–Heide Railway Company (Wesselburen–Heider Eisenbahngesellschaft) opened a branch from Weddinghusen to the town of Wesselburen on 1 November 1878 and to Büsum in 1883 (for freight from 1 November and for passengers from 15 November)—this route, the Heide–Büsum railway, still exists today.

The Karolinenkoog–Karolinenkoog Eider ferry section was opened on 1 June 1886. From there, a steam ferry operated for passengers and freight over the Eider river to Tonning.

The Western Holstein railway company was taken over by the Prussian state railways on 1 July 1890.

The line to Karolinenkoog survived only until 20 January 1940. On this day the last train ran to the Karolinenkoog landing ramp, which was destroyed by bombs on this day. Passenger services were cut back to Hemmerwurth on 1 November 1942 and to Weddinghusen at the timetable change on 23 May 1954. Freight traffic to Hemme ended on the last day of 1958. Freight traffic operated to Weddinghusen until 30 April 1968.
