= West Holstein Railway Company =

German railway company

The West Holstein Railway Company was founded in 1875 with the aim of connecting the west Holstein region in the present-day district of Dithmarschen in the German state of Schleswig-Holstein with the railway junction of Neumünster and beyond with the cities of Kiel and Lübeck. Its creation involved the Kingdom of Prussia, the Altona-Kiel Railway Company, neighbouring villages and towns and the town of Tonning.

== History ==
After Schleswig-Holstein was annexed by Prussia as a result of the Second Schleswig War, the Glückstadt–Elmshorn Railway Company (Glückstadt-Elmshorner Eisenbahn-Gesellschaft), which owned the railway from Hamburg to Itzehoe (now part of the Marsh Railway) was able to promote the extension of its line to Heide. The West Holstein Railway Company (Westholsteinische Eisenbahn-Gesellschaft) opened its first 79 km long stretch from Neumünster via Hohenwestedt to Heide and Weddinghusen to Karolinenkoog at the Eider estuary as the first branch line in Germany (Neumünster–Heide railway and the Heide–Karolinenkoog railway) on 22 August 1877. From here, the town of Tönning on the Eiderstedt peninsula was reached by means of a steam ferry, which operated from 6 August 1878. The bridging of the river would have been too expensive because of its considerable width and only in 1886 was the Marsh Railway extended through Friedrichstadt. This extension made the line to Karolinenkoog largely unnecessary, so that the northern section was closed in 1942 after a long period of low use.

On 1 November 1878, the Wesselburen–Heide Railway Company (Wesselburen–Heider Eisenbahngesellschaft), with the involvement of the West Holstein Railway, the Altona-Kiel Railway Company and the Wesselburen municipality, opened a line that branched off from the Heide–Karolinenkoog railway in Weddinghusen and ran west for 11 kilometres to Wesselburen.

After the Wesselburen–Heide Railway had passed in the ownership of the West Holstein Railway Company on 1 April 1881, which already operated its trains and infrastructure, the line was extended a further 10 km to Büsum. Freight traffic commenced on 1 November 1883 and passenger traffic on 15 November 1883.

On 1 July 1890, the Prussian state railways bought the company, including its exactly 100 km long network, and placed it under the Eisenbahndirektion (railway division headquarters) in Altona.

Today Nordbahn Eisenbahngesellschaft operates passenger services from Neumünster via Heide to Büsum. The branch-line to Karolinenkoog was closed in sections. Passenger services—as far as Hemmerwurth—ended on 23 May 1954 and freight traffic operated for another five years.
