= Heide–Büsum railway =

Railway line in Germany

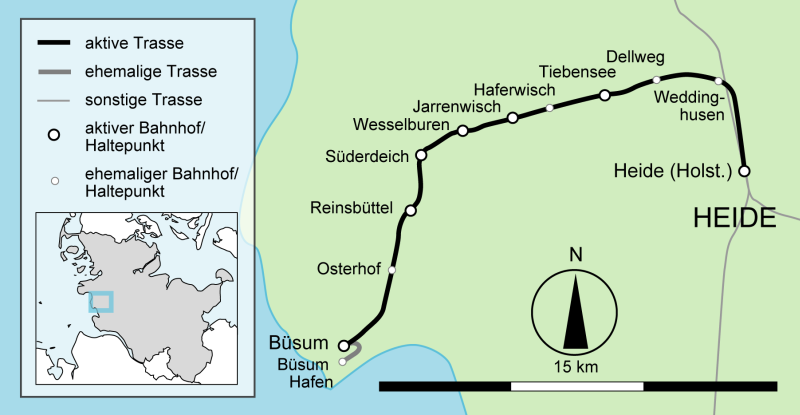

Overview
- Line number: 1206
- Locale: Schleswig-Holstein, Germany

Service
- Route number: 133

Technical
- Line length: 24 km (15 mi)
- Track gauge: 1,435 mm (4 ft 8 1/2 in) standard gauge

The Heide–Büsum railway is a line in the Dithmarschen district in the German state of Schleswig-Holstein, connecting the district seat of Heide with the North Sea resort of Büsum.

== Geography ==
The line runs from Heide station as a continuation of the Neumünster–Heide railway parallel to the Marsh Railway and then running under it and passing through shallow marsh land to Büsum. The most important stop along the way is in the small town of Wesselburen. Büsum station is on the North Sea and is mainly used by tourists.

== History ==
The Weddinghusen–Wesselburen section was opened on 1 November 1878 by the Wesselburen–Heider Eisenbahngesellschaft (Wesselburen–Heide Railway Company) as a branch line of the existing Heide–Karolinenkoog railway, opened in 1877. The extension of this branch line to Büsum was opened for freight on 1 November 1883. Passenger services commenced on 15 November 1883. From the outset operations were carried out by the West Holstein Railway Company (Westholsteinische Eisenbahn-Gesellschaft), which bought the Wesselburen–Heide Railway Company on 1 April 1881. The Western Holstein railway company was taken over by the Prussian state railways on 1 July 1890.

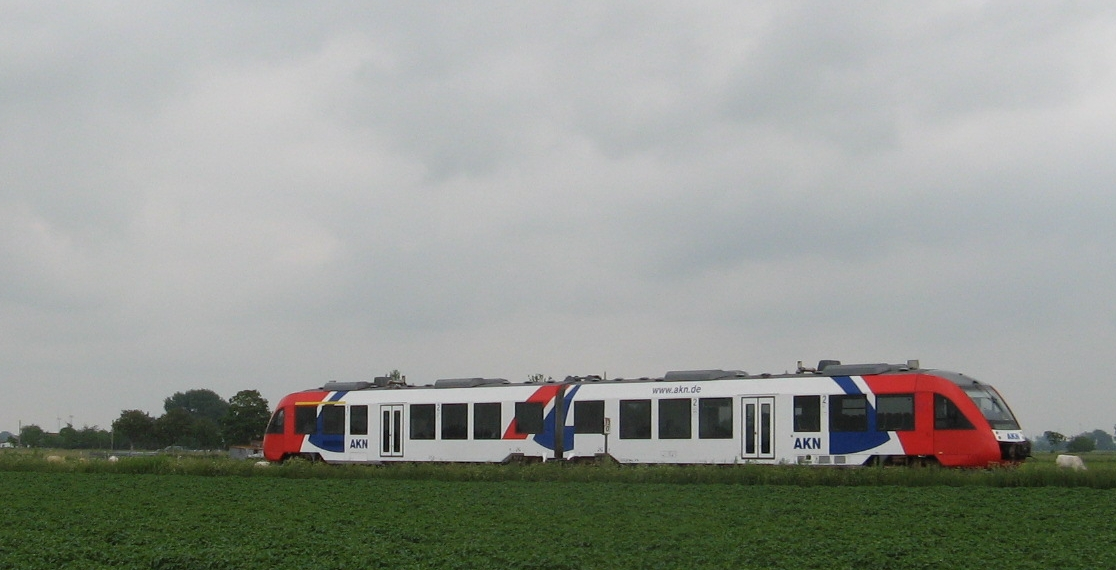
AKN train near Jarrenwisch

An extensive network of 750 mm gauge railways (the Wesselburener Spurbahnen) ran to Wesselburen for the carriage of agricultural produce, which was then transported towards Heide. A 2.5 km long Spalding railway with a track gauge of 600 mm ended at the station Osterhof.

In the late 1950s, passenger services included, in addition to stopping trains, a pair of express services on the route from Büsum via Heide and Neumünster to Eutin. In the 1980s, the use of uneconomic train sets (a class V 100 locomotive hauling Silberling carriages with a control car) led to a temporary decline of the line.

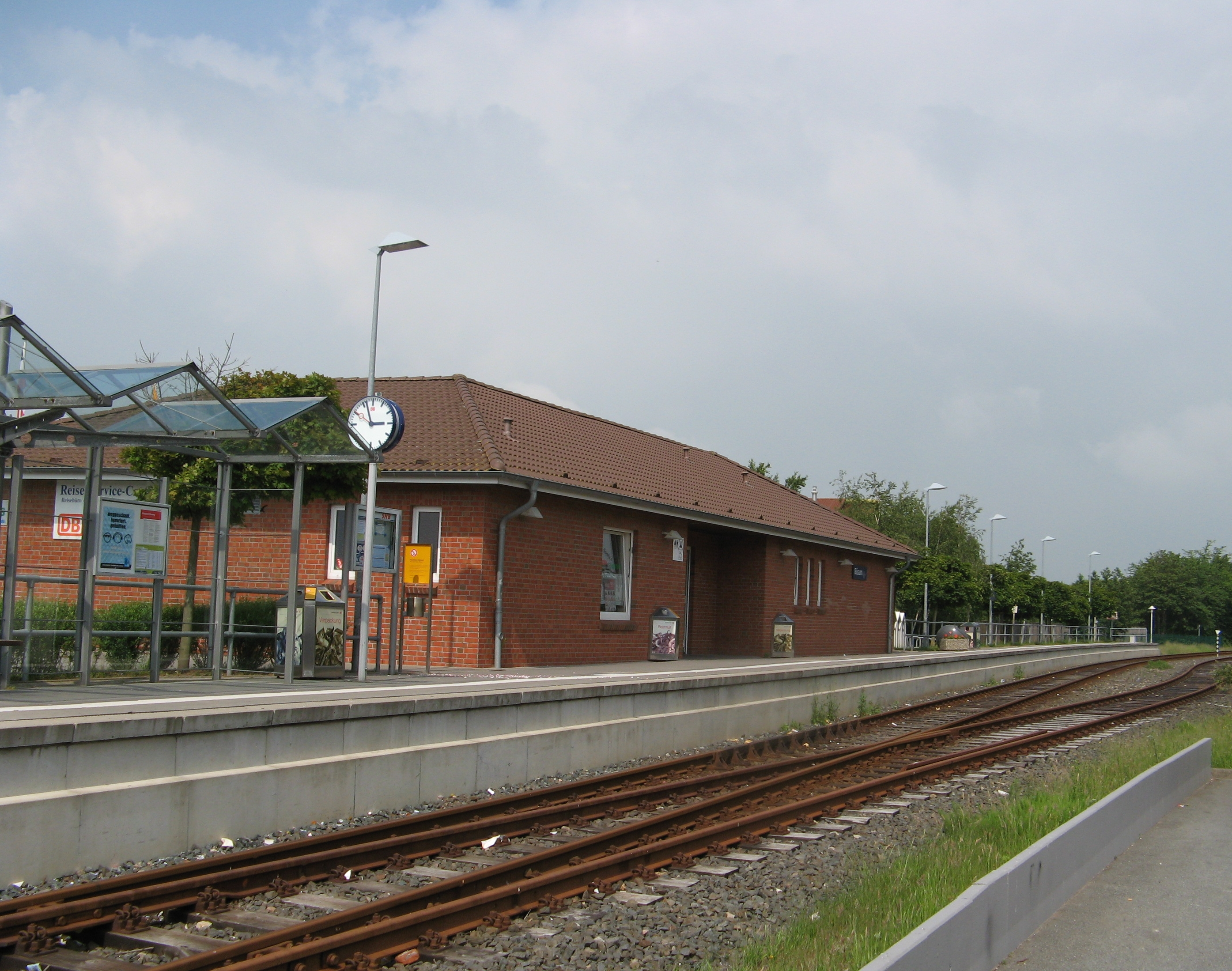
Büsum station

All sidings on the Heide–Büsum line have been removed and stations have been downgraded to halts (that is all sets of points at the stations have been removed).

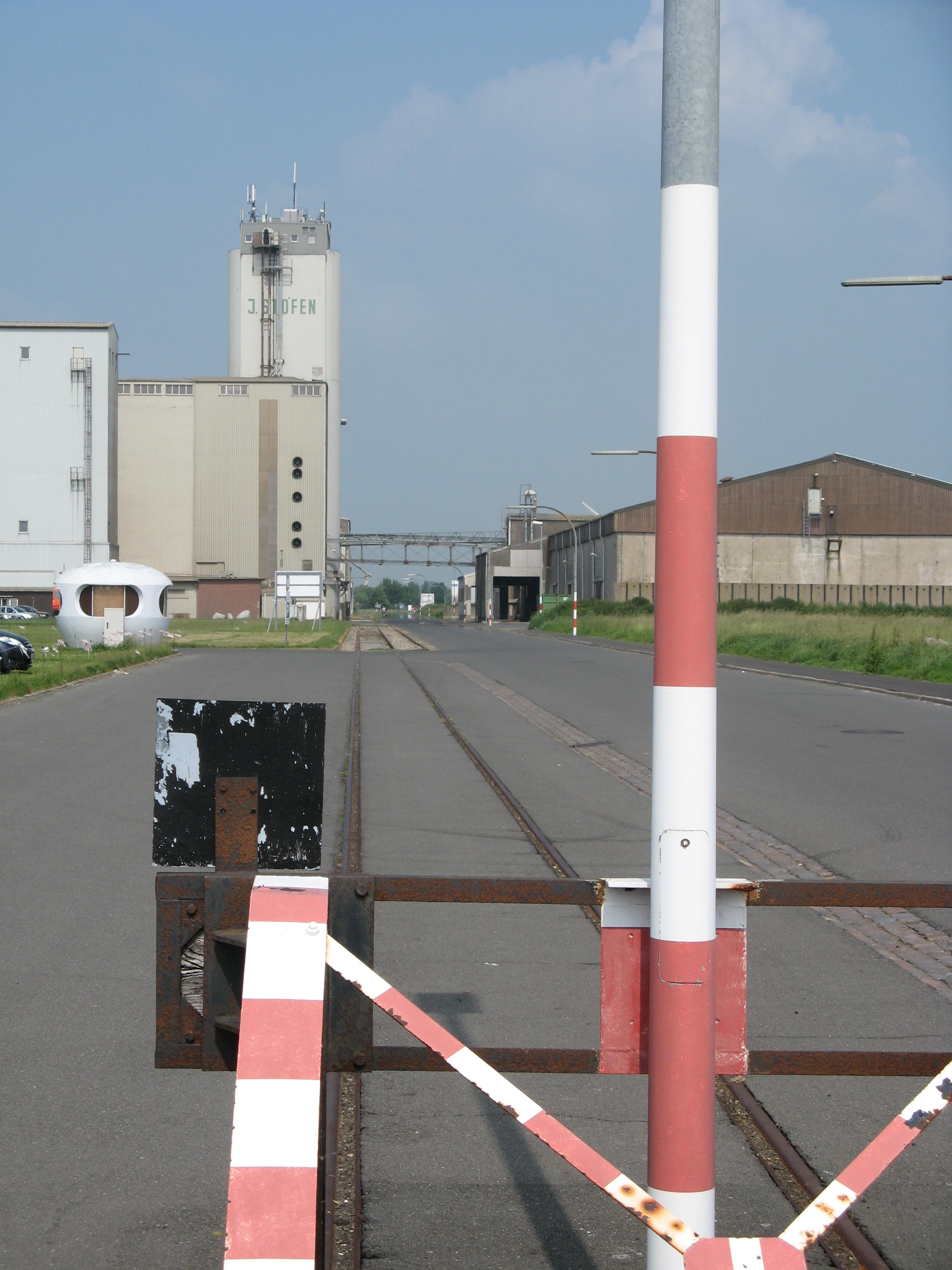
Büsum port railway

From 5 November 2000, operations on the line were won at tender by Schleswig-Holstein-Bahn GmbH, a subsidiary of AKN Eisenbahn AG (operator of the Hamburg-Altona–Neumünster railway). Osterhof and Haferwisch stations were closed as part of the launch of the associated regular interval timetable between Heide and Büsum.

Since the AKN won the tender for operations on the Neumünster–Heide railway in 2003, the two have been operated under a common timetable number. Most trains coming from Neumünster continue to Büsum. Services are operated with LINT 41 railcars.

Since the timetable change in December 2011, the line has been operated by NBE Nordbahn Eisenbahngesellschaft mbh & Co. KG, a joint subsidiary of AKN Eisenbahn AG and BeNEX GmbH. These trains mostly run to Neumünster.

Freight traffic officially ended on 28 February 1994. However, the Büsum port railway is maintained for possible future use.
