= Neumünster–Heide railway =

German railway line

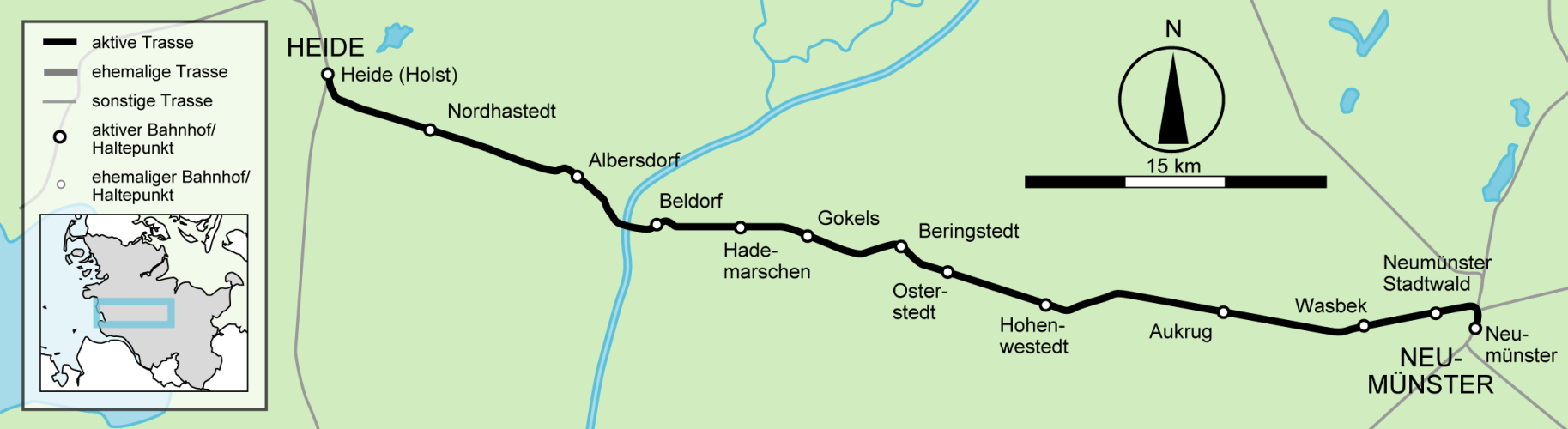

Overview
- Line number: 1042
- Locale: Schleswig-Holstein, Germany

Service
- Route number: 132

Technical
- Line length: 63 km (39 mi)
- Track gauge: 1,435 mm (4 ft 8 1/2 in) standard gauge

The Neumünster–Heide railway is a single-track, non-electrified railway line the German state of Schleswig-Holstein, connecting the city of Neumünster in central Holstein and Heide, the seat of the district of Dithmarschen.

== Geography ==
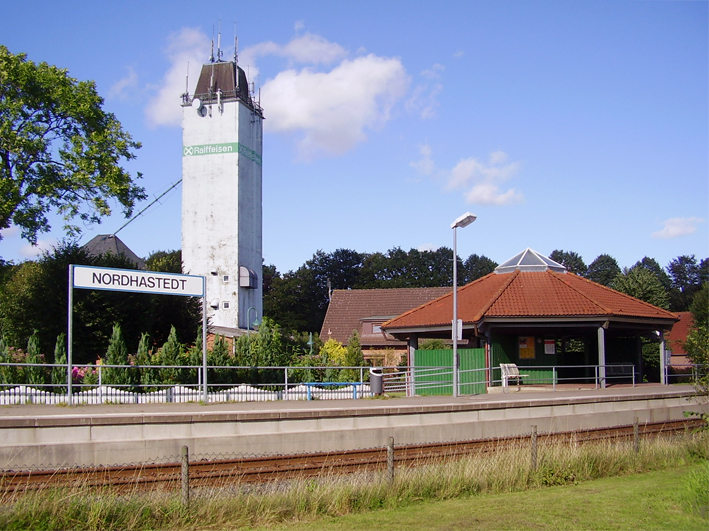
Nordhastedt station

The line leaves the Hamburg-Altona–Kiel railway north of Neumünster station. From then on, it runs west through the Geest landscape. In addition to Neumünster, it passed through the district of Rendsburg-Eckernförde and Dithmarschen. The most important station on the line is Hohenwestedt. Near Beldorf the line crosses the Grünental high bridge (Grünentaler Hochbrücke) over the Kiel Canal. It runs to the eastern side of Heide station and continues as the Heide–Büsum railway under the Hamburg–Husum–Westerland railway.

== History ==
The Neumünster–Heide–Weddinghusen–Karolinenkoog line was opened on 22 August 1877 by the Westholsteinische Eisenbahn-Gesellschaft (West Holstein Railway Company). In Karolinenkoog a steam ferry connected to the port of Tönning in Eiderstedt (see Heide–Karolinenkoog railway). In 1878, the company built a branch line was built from Weddinghusen to Wesselburen. This line was extended to Büsum in 1883. The Western Holstein railway company was taken over by the Prussian state railways on 1 July 1890.

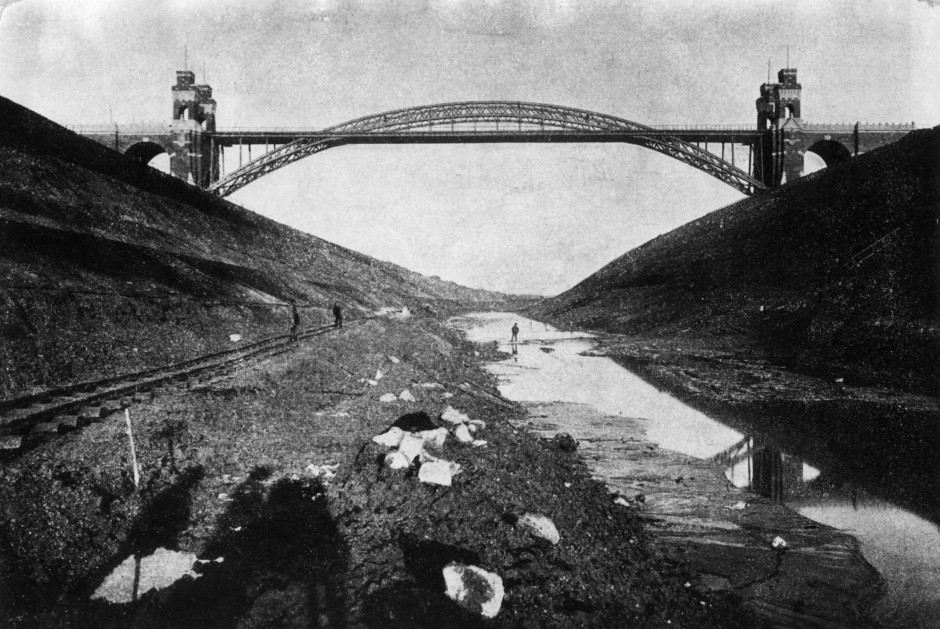
High bridge in about 1900

In 1892, the Grünental high bridge was built over the Kiel Canal, which was under construction. It was a road bridge with the railway track running down the centre. When rail traffic needed to run over the bridge, it was closed to road traffic by barriers at short notice.

In Hohenwestedt, there were connections to the Rendsburg District Railway (Rendsburger Kreisbahn) until 1954 (towards Schenefeld) and until 1956 (towards Rendsburg).

In the late 1950s, passenger services included, in addition to stopping trains, a pair of express services on the route from Büsum via Heide and Neumünster to Eutin.

=== 1970s until today ===
Passenger services in the 1970s and 1980s were operated with class 515 railcars and then with less comfortable railbuses because the bridge over the Kiel Canal did not allow for higher axle loads.

In 1986, the old Grünental high bridge was demolished and replaced to its north with a new bridge with the road separated from the rail track.

Passenger services on the line were closed around 1990. The line was one of two remaining east–west lines in Schleswig-Holstein. In particular, the line was a possible detour route of military strategic importance.

After peripheral rationalisation, the operator of the Hamburg-Altona–Neumünster railway (AKN Eisenbahn) took over both the operation of rail traffic and the management of the track infrastructure in 1993 from Deutsche Bahn, initially on a trial basis with a ten-year lease. This brought significant upgrades for the wayside stations. Passenger services were operated by AKN with modernised VT A railcars.

== Current operations ==
Since the timetable change in December 2011, the line has been operated by NBE Nordbahn Eisenbahngesellschaft mbh & Co. KG, a joint subsidiary of AKN Eisenbahn AG and BeNEX GmbH. In 2003, AKN took over the operations of Schleswig-Holstein-Bahn GmbH. Since then, almost all trains have run to Büsum. This is reflected in the common timetable route number of 132. The number of trains has been increased on the weekends. Services are operated with LINT 41 railcars.

At the time of the acquisition of the SHB by the AKN, it also terminated the lease of the Neumünster–Heide line. DB Netz also took over the line’s maintenance again and straightened the line to remove numerous speed restrictions, which had significantly lengthened travel times. Due to the extended travel times, the scheduled meeting of trains at Heide and Neumünster stations under the regular interval timetable could not be fully achieved.

Freight traffic is no longer carried out on the line. The last freight customers were Lego and some other firms in Hohenwestedt and the Bundeswehr in Albersdorf.

Trains run every hour between Hohenwestedt and Neumünster. The total line is, however, served only every two hours. There are numerous stops along the line. In the course of the modernisation of the line, however, the old station building in Wasbek, Aukrug, Osterstedt, Gokels and Nordhastedt were demolished. Hohenwestedt is the only station on the line with a crossing loop. After a short stop in Heide, trains continue to Büsum.
