= Heide (Holst) station =

Railway station in Heide, Germany

Heide (Holst)
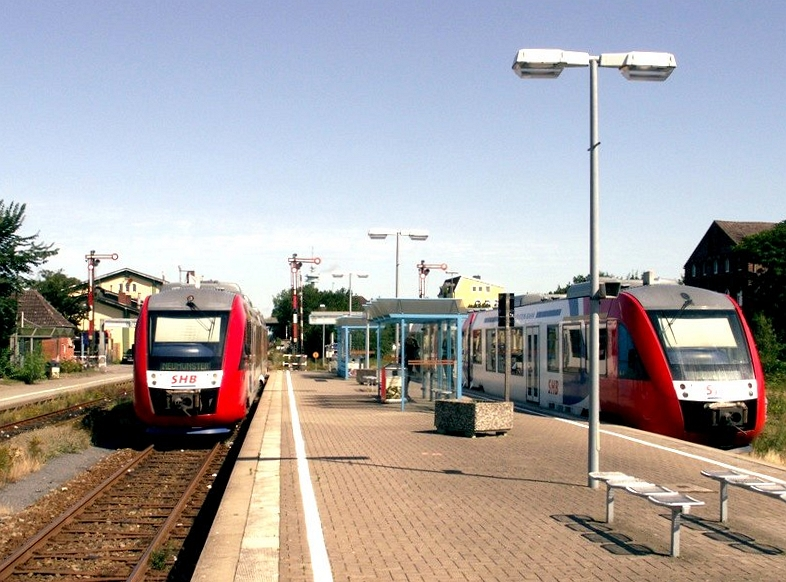
- Heide station, former platforms 102 and 103, with the old station building to the left in the background

General information
- Location: Heide, Schleswig-Holstein; Germany
- Coordinates: 54°11′35″N 9°06′04″E
- Owner: Deutsche Bahn
- Operator: DB Station&Service
- Lines: Elmshorn–Westerland (KBS 130); Heide–Büsum (KBS 132); Neumünster–Heide (KBS 132, not in DB timetable)
- Platforms: 5
- Connections: 2581 2612 2652 2820 2910 2920 2930 2940 3525

Construction
- Accessible: Yes

Other information
- Station code: 2625
- DS100 code: AHI
- Category: 3
- Website: www.bahnhof.de

History
- Opened: 22 August 1877

Services
Preceding station	DB Fernverkehr	Following station
Husum towards Westerland (Sylt)	ICE 18	Itzehoe towards Berlin Südkreuz
Husum towards Westerland (Sylt)	ICE 24	Itzehoe towards Frankfurt (Main) Hbf
Husum towards Westerland (Sylt)	ICE 33	Itzehoe towards Köln Hbf
Preceding station	DB Regio Nord	Following station
Lunden towards Westerland (Sylt)	RE 6	Itzehoe towards Hamburg-Altona
Terminus	RB 62	Meldorf towards Itzehoe
Preceding station		Following station
Tiebensee towards Büsum	RB 63	Nordhastedt towards Neumünster
Location

Heide (Holst) station is a junction station in the town of Heide in the district of Dithmarschen in the German state of Schleswig-Holstein. The Hamburg–Elmshorn–Heide–Westerland, the Neumünster–Heide and the Heide–Büsum lines cross here.

== History ==
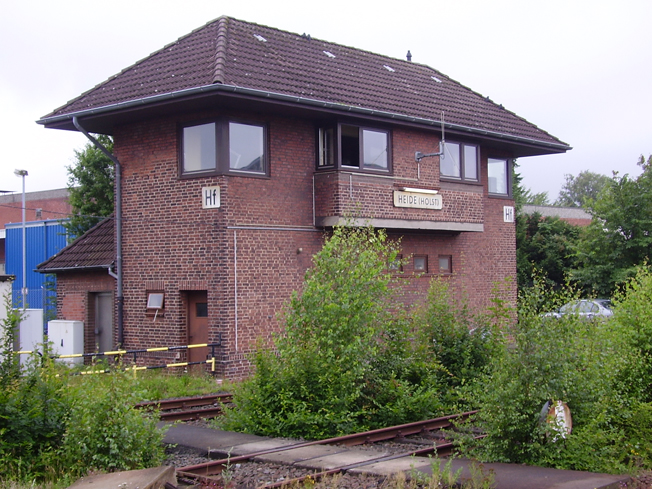
The old signal box in Heide

The station was built in 1877 by the West Holstein Railway Company (Westholsteinische Eisenbahn-Gesellschaft) along with its main line from Neumünster. This line continued to Karolinenkoog as the Heide–Karolinenkoog railway, including a ferry to Tönning opened in 1876. In 1878, the Marsh Railway was extended to the station, giving a direct connections to Hamburg via Itzehoe and Elmshorn. The line was extended to Husum in 1886, using part of the Karolinenkoog branch. In 1883, the West Holstein Railway also completed a branch to Büsum. The premises of the Norderdithmarschen District Railway (Kreisbahn Norderdithmarschen) were in the station forecourt from 1905 to 1938. It operated a metre gauge railway from Heide to places in the Geest country of the northern Dithmarschen district. Its terminus and loading tracks were to the northeast of the state railway station. The relatively large entrance and administration building of the Norderdithmarschen District Railway is now used as a youth centre and a music school, among other things. The Heide workshop, which was responsible for the provision of locomotives and wagons, was at the southern end of the station from 1878 to 1978.

== Operations ==
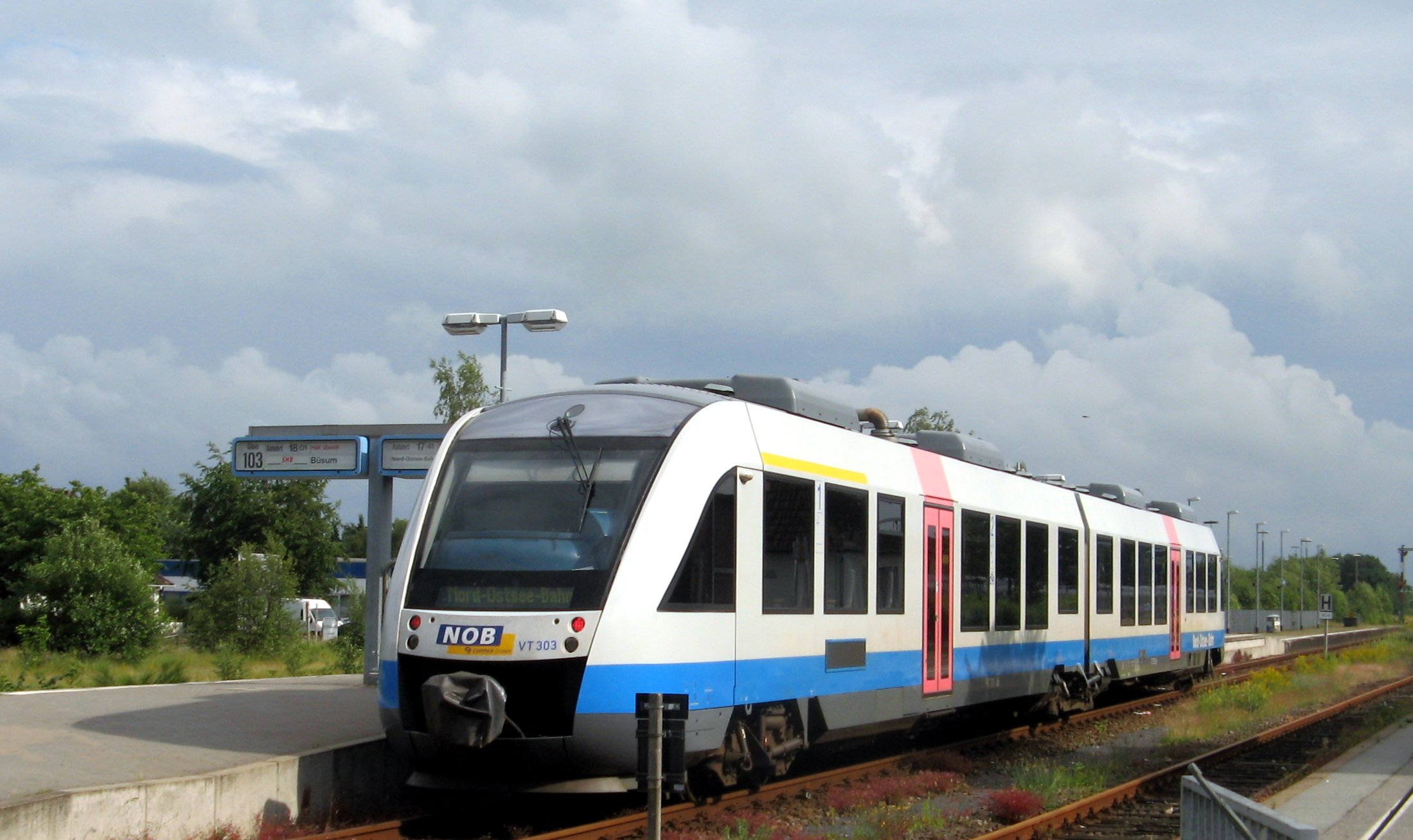
Heide–Itzehoe NOB DMU at old platform 102

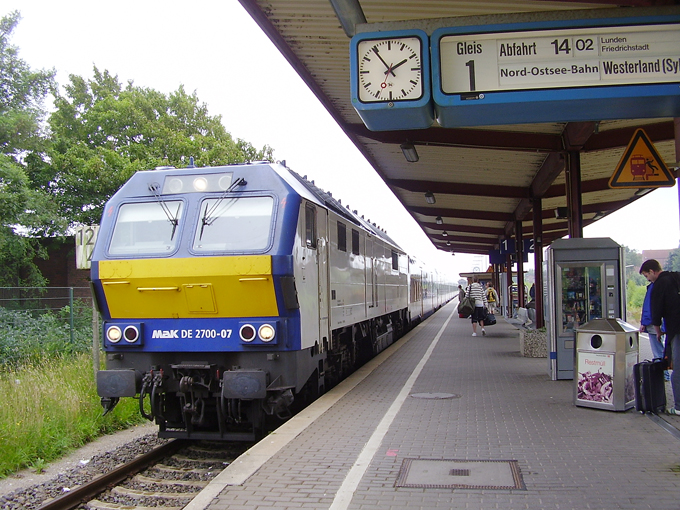
Train of the Nord-Ostsee-Bahn (NOB) at old platform 1, looking to the south

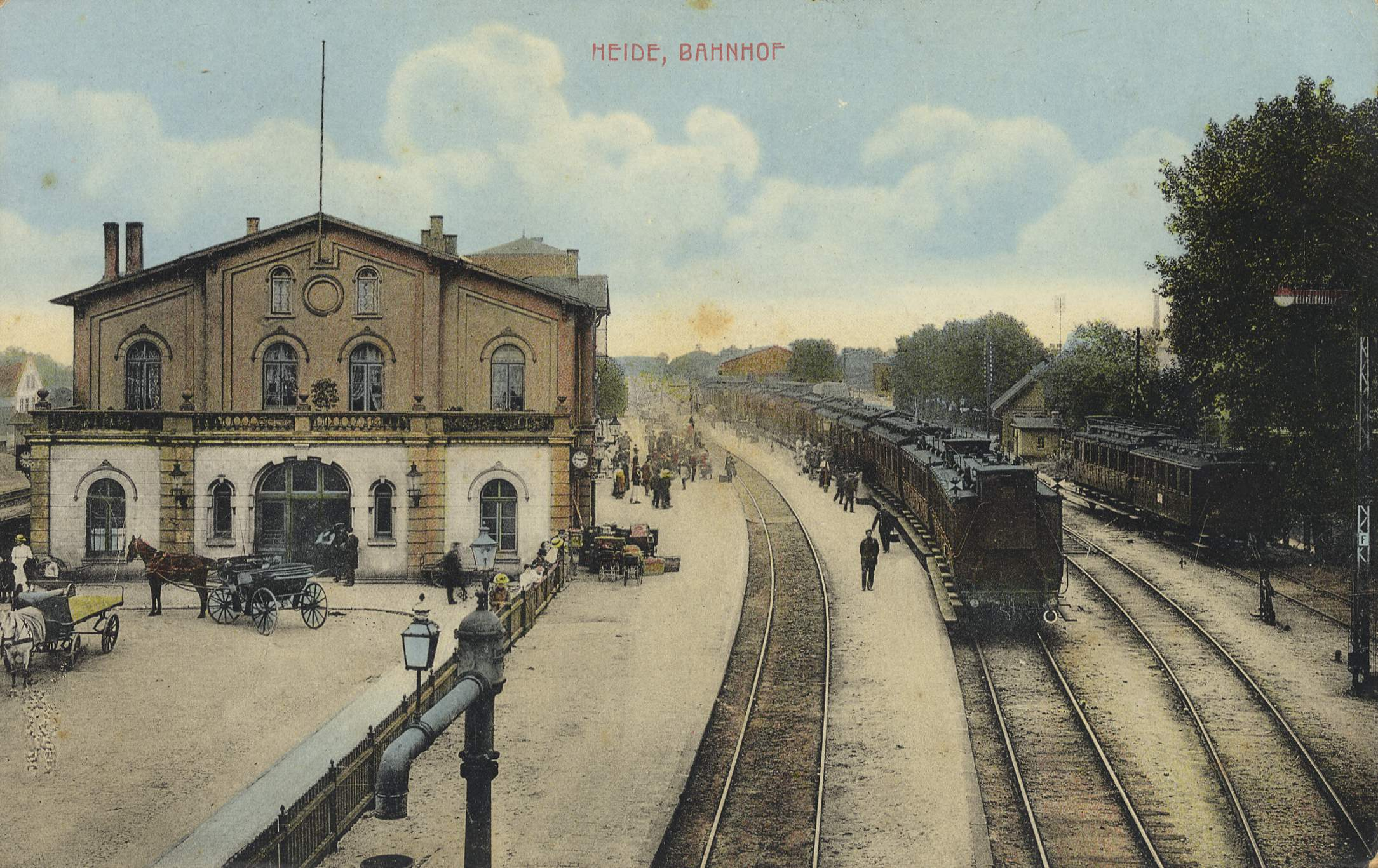
The station from the north on an old postcard in about 1900

Regional services are operated over the Marsh Railway between Hamburg and Westerland (Sylt) by the Nord-Ostsee-Bahn (which is owned by Veolia Verkehr) in both directions every hour. There are also some InterCity services operated by Deutsche Bahn. Between the hourly through trains between Westerland and Hamburg, Nord-Ostsee-Bahn generally operates Regionalbahn services between Heide and Itzehoe offset by about half an hour.

Nord-Ostsee-Bahn also operates hourly services on the Heide-Büsum line, continuing on the Neumünster–Heide line every two hours. Every hour, trains on all lines meet in Heide and thus form a node in the basic interval timetable of Schleswig-Holstein.

In the 2026 timetable, the following services stop at the station:

Line	Route	Frequency	Operator
ICE 18	Westerland – Niebüll – Heide – Hamburg – Berlin – Berlin Südkreuz	One train pair	DB Fernverkehr
ICE 24	Westerland – Niebüll – Heide – Hamburg – Hanover – Kassel-Wilhelmshöhe – Frankfurt (Main)	One train pair	DB Fernverkehr
ICE 33	Westerland (Sylt) – Niebüll – Heide – Hamburg – Bremen – Essen – Köln	One or two train pairs	DB Fernverkehr
RE 6	Westerland (Sylt) – Niebüll – Husum – Heide – Itzehoe – Elmshorn – Hamburg-Altona	Hourly	DB Regio Nord
RB 62	Heide – Itzehoe	Hourly (not coordinated)	DB Regio Nord
RB 63	Büsum – Heide – Hohenwestedt – Neumünster	Every 2 hours, hourly between Büsum and Heide	nordbahn

The railway lines that meet in Heide are not electrified.

== Railway infrastructure ==
The old station building was located on an island between the current tracks 1 and 2 (tracks 2 and 1 until 2011) on the Marsh Railway and 4 and 5 (tracks 101–103 until 2011) on the line to Büsum and Neumünster. This was demolished at the beginning of May 2011 and replaced by a new but much smaller single-storey building on the western side of the railway facilities, which was taken into operations in the early summer of 2013. For this reason, the tracks were re-numbered starting from the west, while previously they were numbered starting from the central platform in each case. Since the beginning of 2013, the old island platform has been completely removed and dismantled.

=== Platform tracks ===
Since its reconstruction the station has five platform tracks. The scheduled use of the tracks is as follows:

- track 1: long-distance and regional services to Hamburg;
- track 2: long-distance and regional services to Westerland;
- track 3: Regionalbahn services to and from Itzehoe;
- track 4: regional services from Neumünster to Büsum;
- track 5: regional services from Büsum to Neumünster.

Until 2011, the tracks were used as follows:

- track 1: long-distance and regional services to Westerland;
- track 2: long distance and regional services to Hamburg and regional services to Itzehoe;
- track 101: most recently disused, previously to and from Itzehoe;
- track 102: regional services to and from Büsum and Neumünster and regional services to and from Itzehoe;
- Track 103: regional services to and from Büsum and Neumünster.
