= Friedrich Voss =

Friedrich Voss (7 July 1872 — 3 March 1953) was a German civil engineer educated at Braunschweig University of Technology.

== Biography ==
Voss was born in Calvörde. As a civil engineer his career began at the municipal waterways management of Hamburg-Harburg. In 1903, Voss became technical assistant at the Ministry of Public Works; 1908 appointed as head of the newly created bridge construction office within the Imperial Office of the Canals, following the enlargements of the Kaiser Wilhelm Canal. Voss designed and engineered three viaducts over the Kiel Canal: The Holtenau (1912-1992), Rendsburg (1913) and Hochdonn (1919) high bridges. In 1923, Voss resigned for health reasons from the civil service and founded an engineering company in Kiel, together with two of his colleagues.

Besides the viaducts over the Kiel Canal, Voss designed numeral other bridges, for example the Rendsburg Swing Bridge over the Kiel Canal that was closed 1961, a road bridge over the Eider at Friedrichstadt as well as a bascule bridge over the Eider at Lexfähre, a bascule bridge in Duisburg, a combined road and railroad bridge over the Rethe in Hamburg and a bridge over the Rhine in Krefeld-Uerdingen.

In 1922 Friedrich Voss was awarded an honorary degree at the Braunschweig University of Technology. He died at Kiel on 3 March 1953. A day after his death, he was awarded the Federal Cross of Merit. Voss is buried at the Park Cemetery Eichhof in Kronshagen.
