= Klanxbüll =

Klanxbüll Klangsbøl / Klangsbel
- Municipality
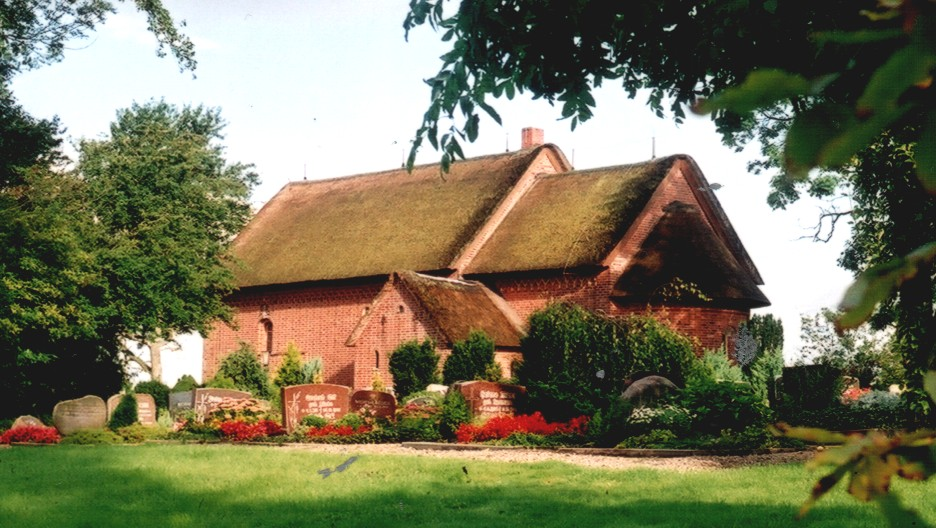
- The church of Klanxbüll features a thatched roof

- Coat of arms

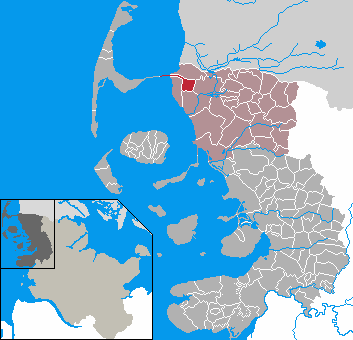
- Location of Klanxbüll; Klangsbøl / Klangsbel within Nordfriesland district
- Interactive map of Klanxbüll; Klangsbøl / Klangsbel
- Location within Germany Location within Schleswig-Holstein
- Coordinates: 54°51′50″N 8°40′35″E
- Country: Germany
- State: Schleswig-Holstein
- District: Nordfriesland
- Municipal assoc.: Südtondern

Government
  - Mayor: Sascha Lewi

Area
  - Total: 10.63 km^{2} (4.10 sq mi)
- Elevation: 1 m (3.3 ft)

Population (2025-12-31)
  - Total: 1,035
  - Density: 97.37/km^{2} (252.2/sq mi)
- Time zone: UTC+01:00 (CET)
  - Summer (DST): UTC+02:00 (CEST)
- Postal codes: 25924
- Dialling codes: 04668
- Vehicle registration: NF
- Website: www.klanxbuell.de

Klanxbüll (Danish Klangsbøl, North Frisian Klangsbel) is a municipality on the mainland in the northwest corner of Schleswig-Holstein, in Kreis Nordfriesland, Germany. The municipality belongs to the Amt Südtondern.

== History ==
The village's chronicle goes with dike construction in the region, because only as the area of Klanxbüll was endiked and drained, could houses be built. Klanxbüll is first mentioned in 1231 with an entry in the land register of the Danish king Valdemar II, since the former duchy of Schleswig (with short exceptions) belonged until 1864 to the Danish crown.

At 1240 a church began to be built; that church, which is now under monument protection, is still the only surviving reed-thatched church on the mainland: image.

Around 1400 Klanxbüll was separated by a storm tide from the remaining mainland and was now on an island.

In 1566 new dams and dikes were built, making a new polder, the Gotteskoog, reconnecting Klanxbüll and the area around to the mainland; part of this separating sea remains as the Gotteskoogsee lake.

=== Marschbahn ===
Klanxbüll got economic importance in 1921, when it got a station on the Marsh Railway railroad.

In 1927 the Hindenburgdamm was built. This causeway connects Sylt island to the mainland. Klanxbüll is the last station on the mainland, before the track reaches Sylt; thus is it for people working in the surrounding countryside and on Sylt an important Park&Ride station (chargeable:; 2.50 euros per day). The surrounding populated areas are declared to be prohibited for parking areas, to stop tourists going to Sylt from choking the area with parked cars. The station equipment was reorganized gradually in the last years. In 2006 a road bridge was built over the railroad, as before road traffic often had long waits at the level crossing while the gates were closed for trains to pass.

== In popular culture ==
Klanxbüll is the setting of the 157th episode of the horror podcast The Magnus Archives, where a fictional disease outbreak takes place.
