= Hochdonn High Bridge =

Hochdonn High Bridge Hochbrücke Hochdonn
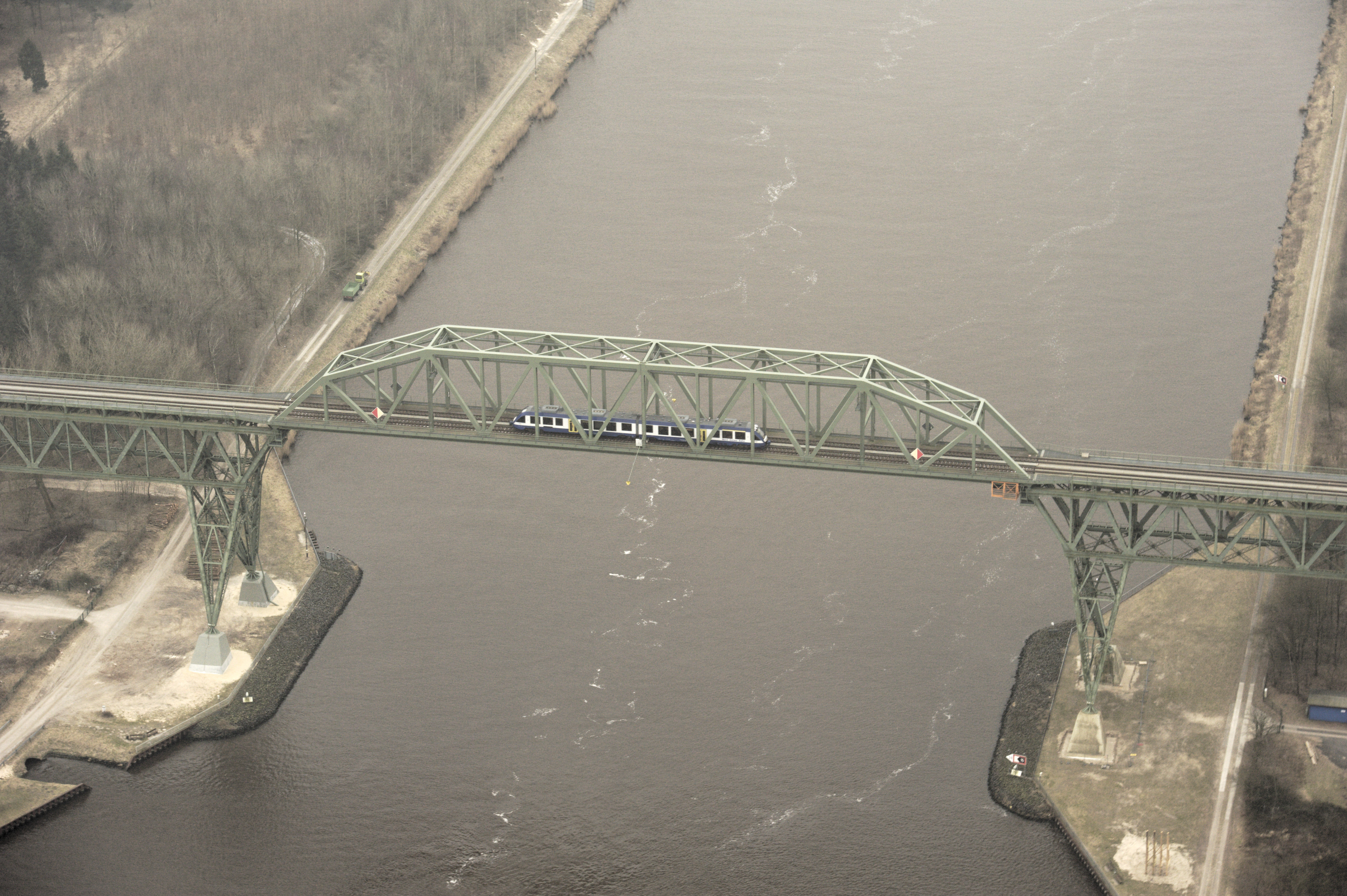
- Train over the Hochdonn High Bridge
- Coordinates: 54.0161°N 9.2975°E
- Carries: Marsh Railway
- Crosses: Kiel Canal
- Locale: Hochdonn, Germany
- Official name: Eisenbahnhochbrücke Hochdonn

Characteristics
- Design: Truss bridge
- Material: Steel
- Total length: 2,218 metres (7,277 ft)
- Height: 68 metres (223 ft)
- Longest span: 143.10 metres (469.5 ft)
- Piers in water: None
- Clearance below: 42 metres (138 ft)

History
- Designer: Friedrich Voss
- Construction start: 1913
- Construction end: 1919
- Opened: 11 June 1920

The Hochdonn High Bridge (Hochbrücke Hochdonn in German) is a railway bridge in the Marsh Railway crossing the Kiel Canal near Hochdonn, Germany. It is a riveted steel bridge, "exposed to extreme railway traffic".

== History ==
The rail bridge was opened on 11 June 1920.

The central part of the main span suffered from general deterioration, but damage caused by two ship collisions made it necessary to substitute a new center part. On 6 November 2006 the 1.465-metric-ton (3,230 lb) 121.10-meter (397.3 ft) long span was removed and carefully passed between the 120-meter gap of the two existing support points. Once removed, the steel structure was lowered onto a transport barge. The new structure that arrived the night before on another transport barge was lifted into place. While lowering and lifting work was going on, this section of the canal was closed and a large number of ships were waiting to pass; the alternative was to navigate around the northern tip of Denmark.

The new central span was also raised by 2 meters (6.6 ft) to a height of 42 meters (138 ft) above the canal, the same height as other bridges on the canal.

== See also ==
- Kiel Canal

== Gallery ==
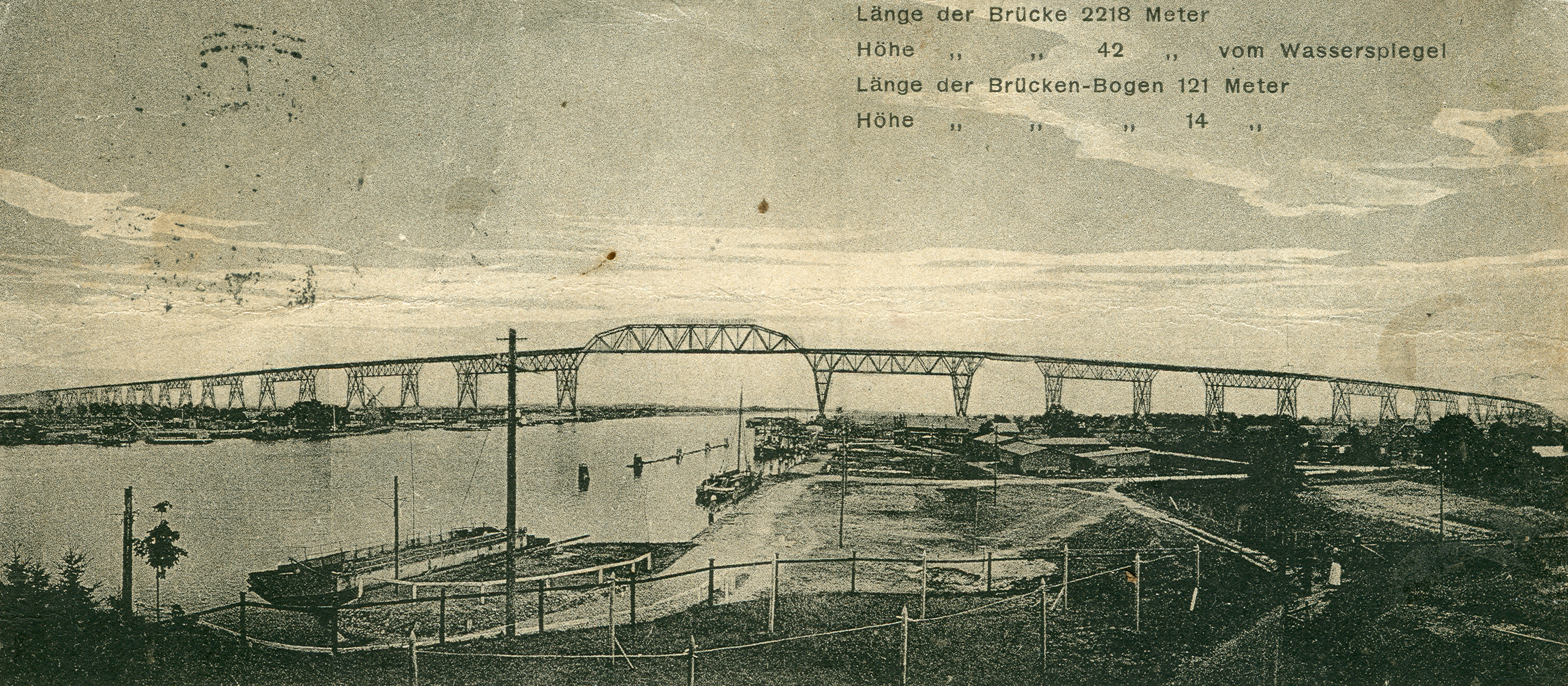
Postcard showing the railway and the High Bridge, circa 1920.

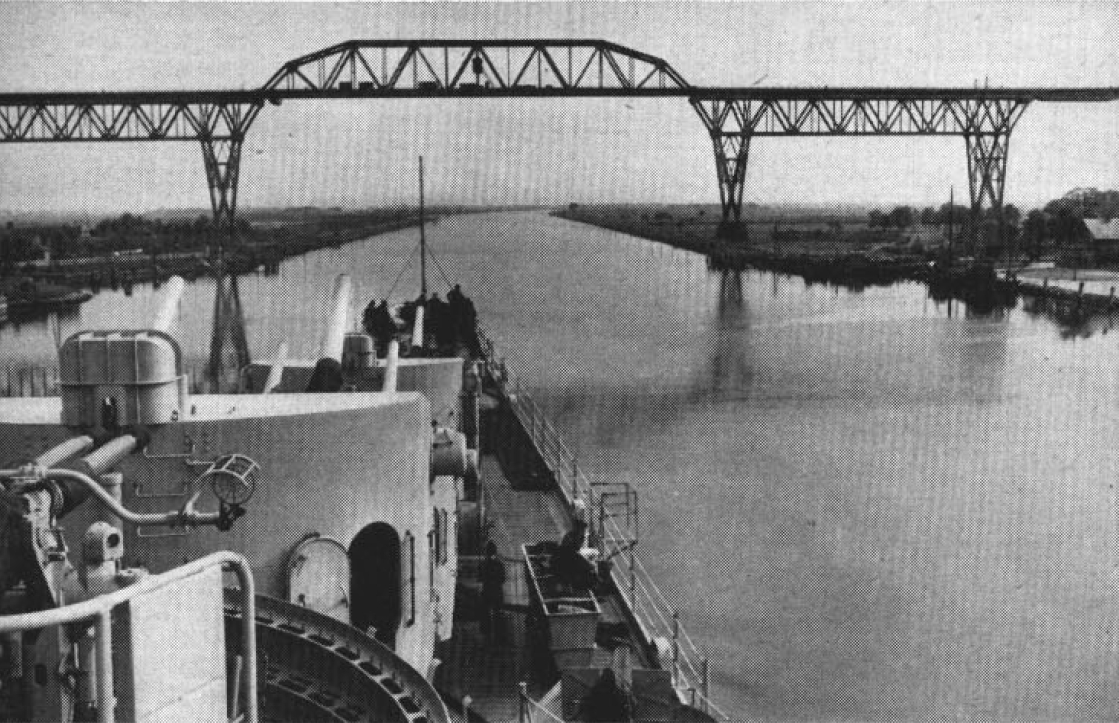
American warship in the canal nearing the bridge, 1948.
