= Spalding railway =

The Spalding railway was a German narrow gauge railway system invented, patented and developed by Heinrich Andreas Spalding in 1884 for forestry and agriculture applications. It was similar to the Decauville railway, which had been invented and patented in France eight years earlier.

== History ==
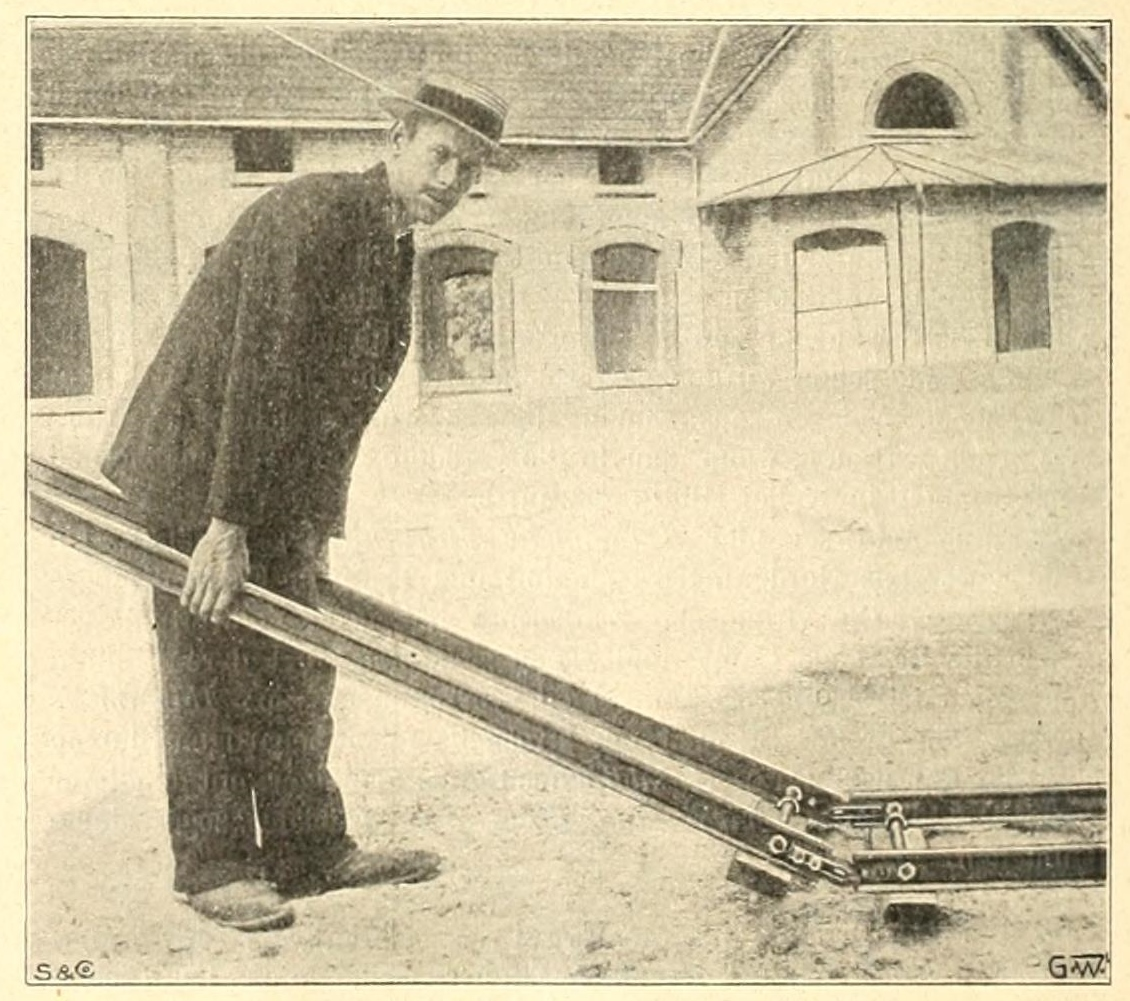
Track laying

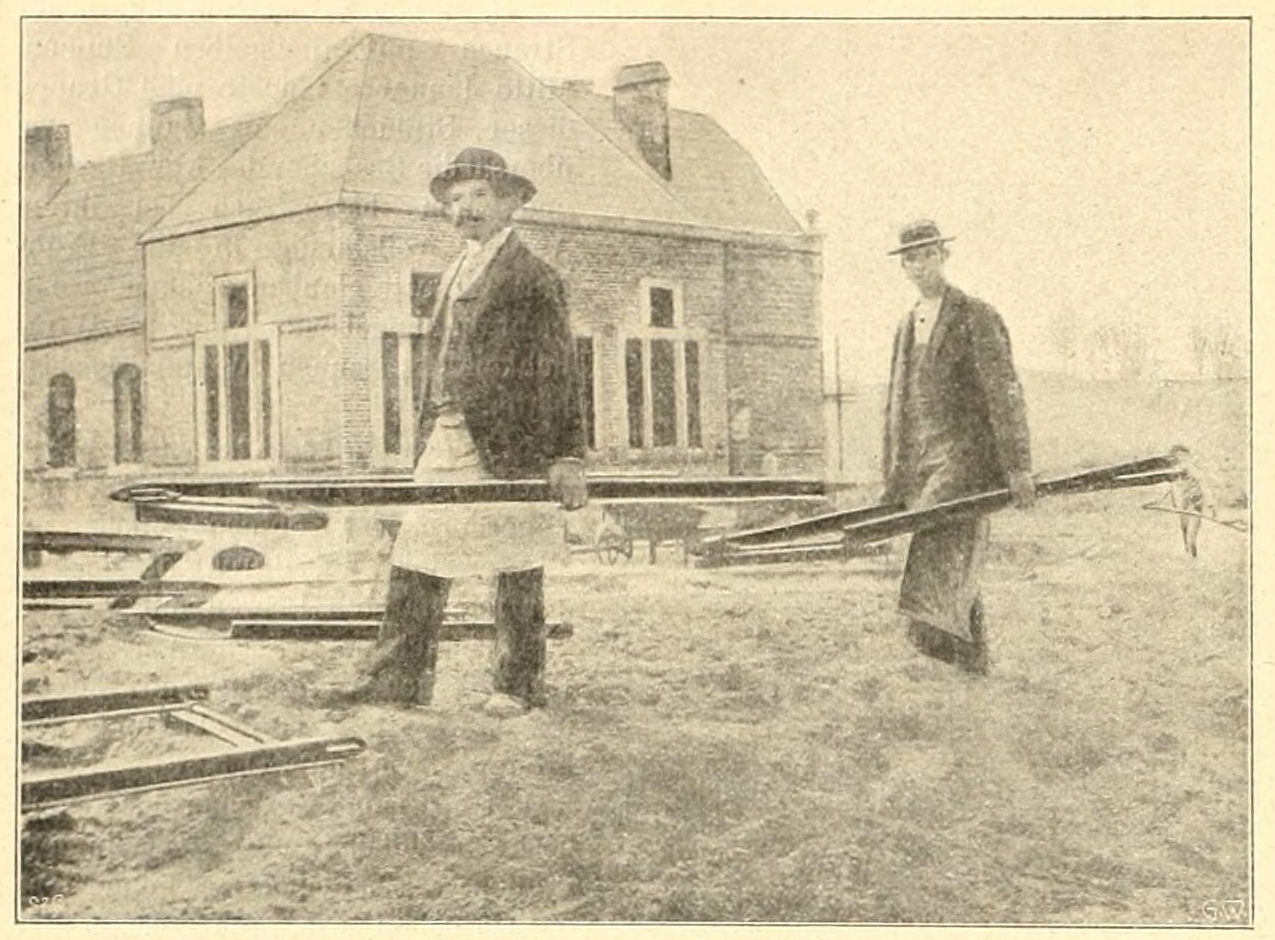
Portable Spalding track

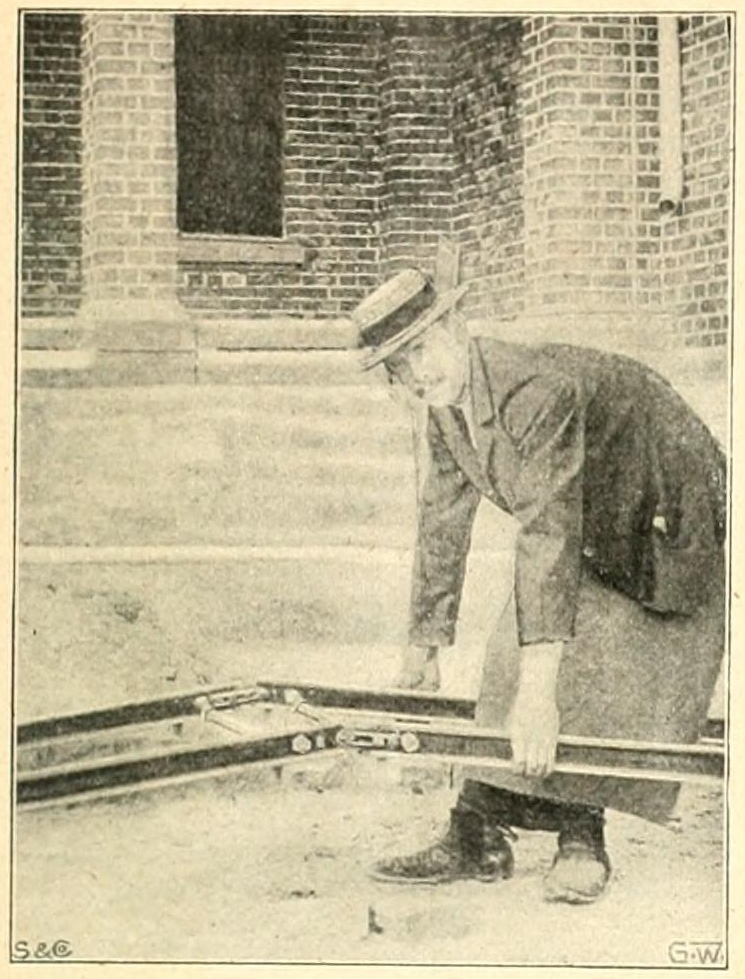
Track removal

The entrepreneur Heinrich Spalding from Glewitz in Western Pomerania was the first German industrialist, who produced in 1884 a narrow-gauge tramway at his own risk for the transport of logs and firewood in the royal Prussian forest Grimnitz in the Margraviate of Brandenburg. The implementation this 3-kilometre-long (1.9 mi) tramway between two felling sites and the nearest navigable water at Lake Werbellin, resulted in cost savings of 11,387 marks during the transport of 8,536 m^{3} of pine and firewood over an average distance of 4.7 kilometres (2.9 mi). The costs for providing the tramway amounted to 47,000 Marks, so that the railway system should have paid off in four years.

The German Emperor William I, the patron of German hunting, rode in an improvised hunting saloon car on the portable track of the Spalding railway to Schorfheide. From there, for the first time in the history of hunting the German Emperor's hunting bag of game was brought back from the forest by rail.

== Design ==
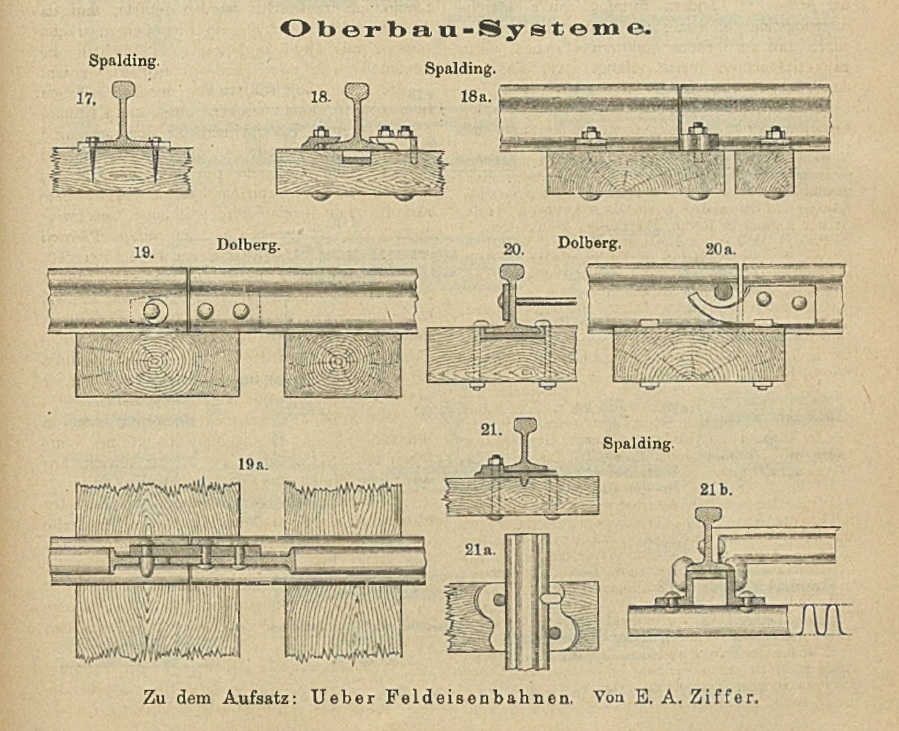
Track systems by Spalding and Dolberg, 1892

The Spalding railway used Vignoles rails. The rail joints were initially supported by two wooden sleepers, one of them was wide and the other narrow (Figure 18a), with the wide sleeper protruding beyond the end of one pair of rails, while the narrow one was recessed from the end of the other panel. When the prefabricated panels were joined, the broad sleeper of one panel lay next to the narrow sleeper of the other. The free rail ends were bolted together using fishplates as in conventional tracks. The system had the advantage that required repairs were easy make but the height of the wooden sleepers prevented the use of horses, and level crossings with other traffic.

The Dolberg works in Rostock improved the Spalding system by using metal tie rods and by omitting the narrow wooden sleeper at one end of the panel. To secure the butt joint, the rails were hooked onto a metallic sleeper at one end. One rail was provided with a hooked tab which engaged around a metallic tie rod at the end of the other rails. Th joint could only be taken apart by lifting the opposite end of the frame (Figures 19 and 20). The easy disassembly allowed other traffic to cross easily at level crossings by simply lifting one or two sections from the rail line.

The 2 m track sections with a gauge of 600 mm consisted of rails that were connected at both ends by metallic tie rods and rested on wooden sleepers. One man could carry a section with ease. Curved sections were bent with a radius of 4 m. They were only 1.5 meters long and could be used for right and left turns.

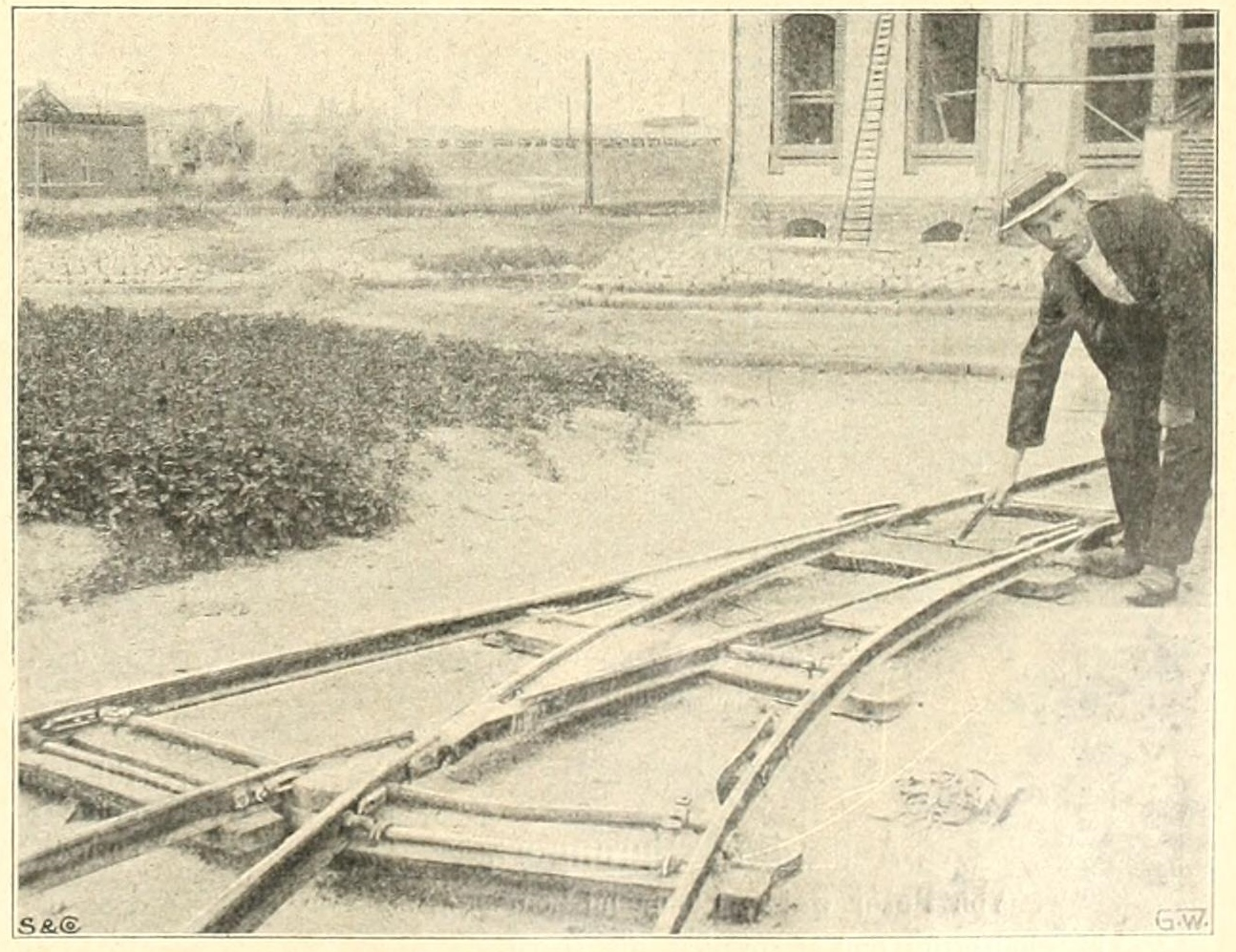
Universal switch

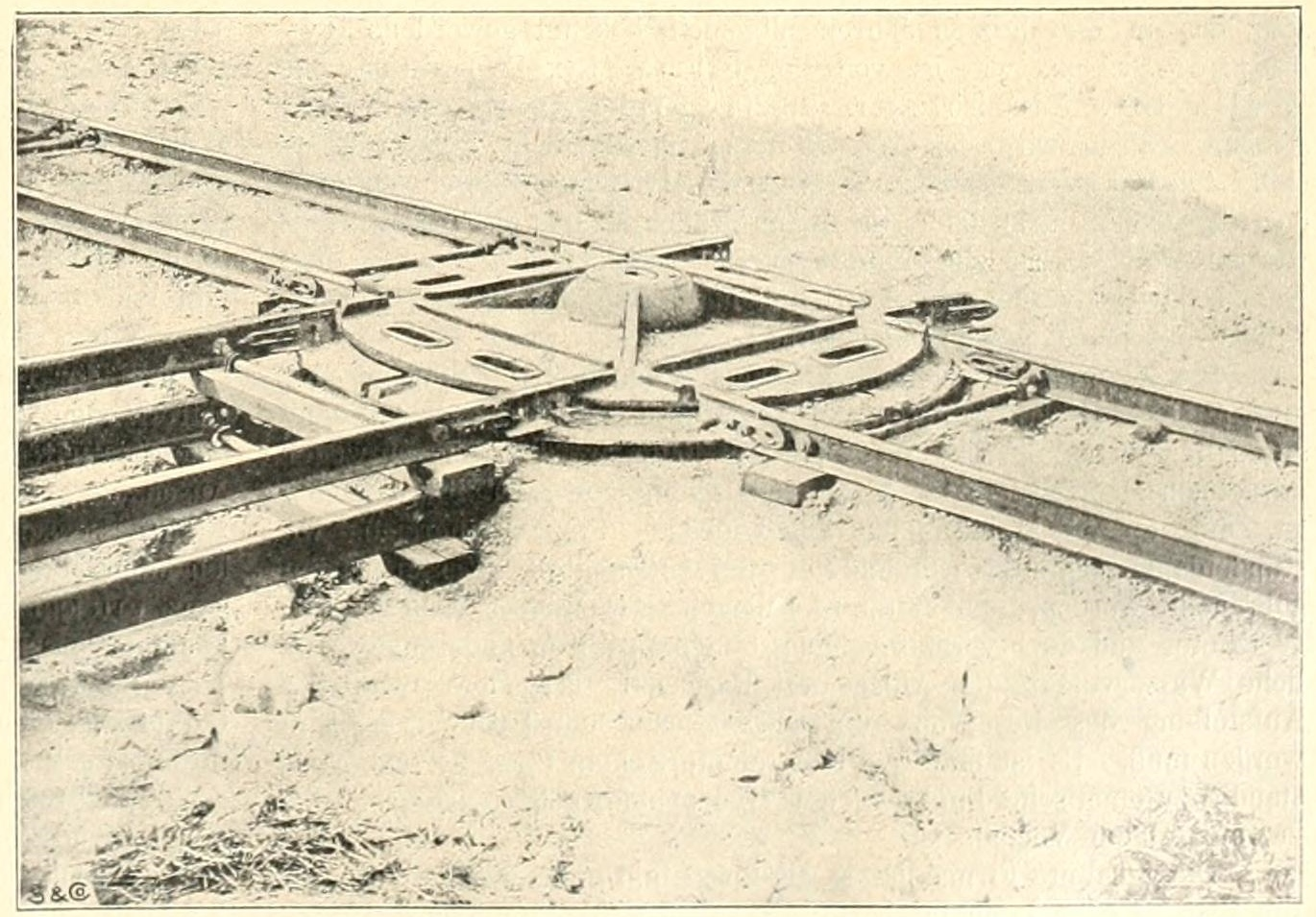
Turntable

The 4 m long Spalding universal switch was provided with guard rails, which should make a derailment impossible even if the points were set incorrectly. By simply unscrewing the rails from the pad and then re-assembling them upside-down, a right turn could be turned into a left turn and vice versa, since the switches were made of symmetrical double-headed rail profiles. Turntables with connecting rails were used for right-angle turns. The turntable was easy and safe to operate, because it could be locked after each rotation by using a light lever.

== Rolling stock ==
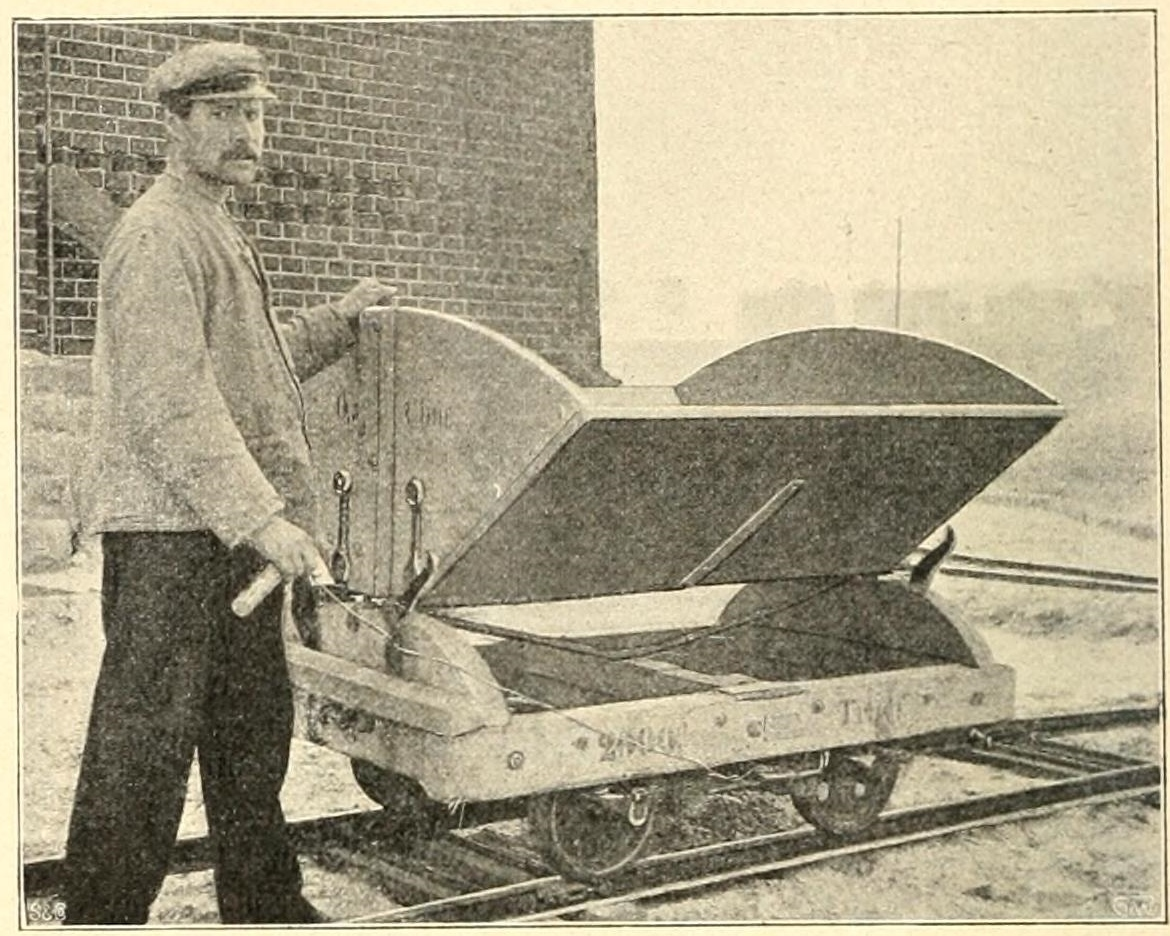
Wooden V skip wagon

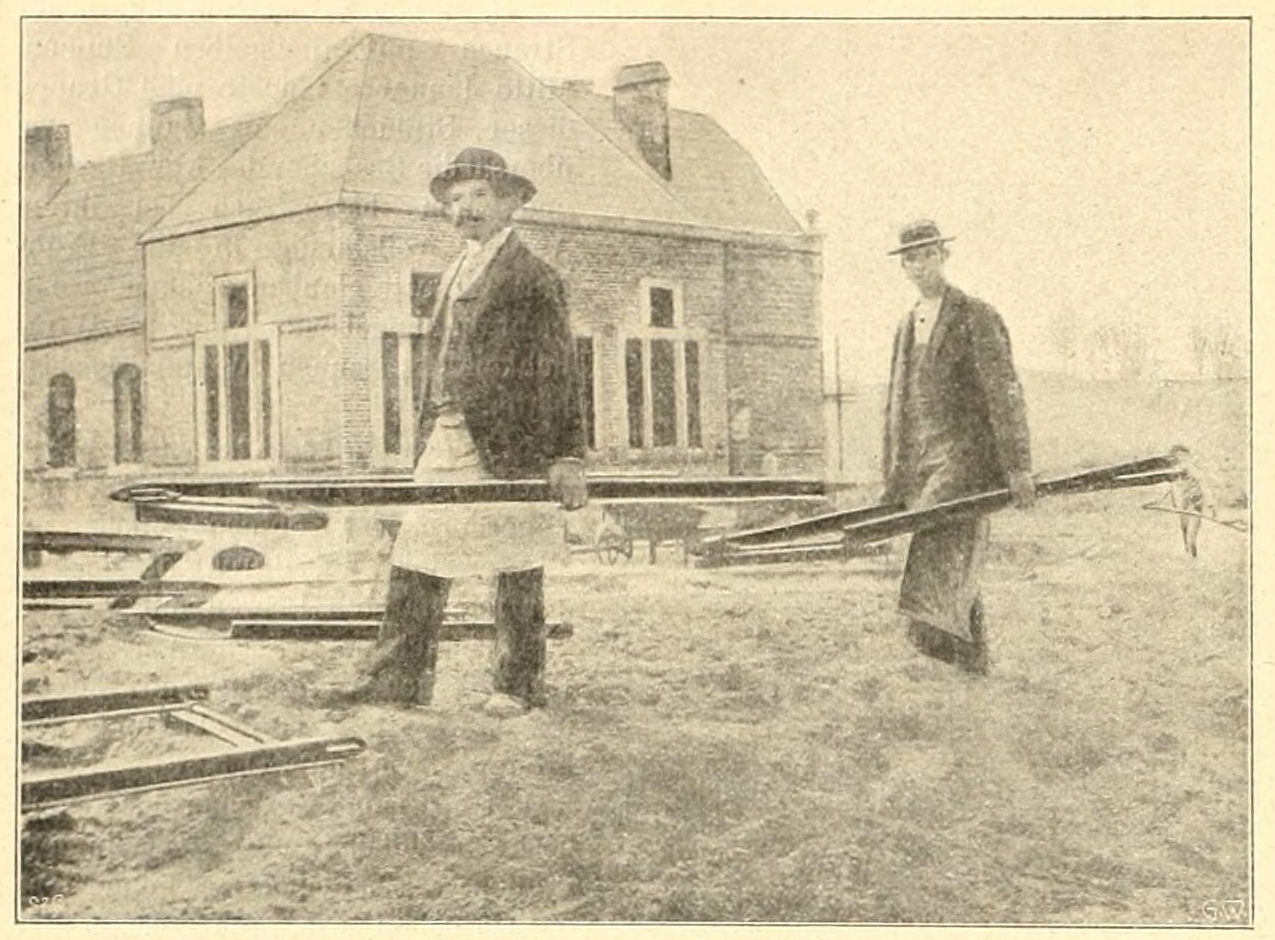
portable track

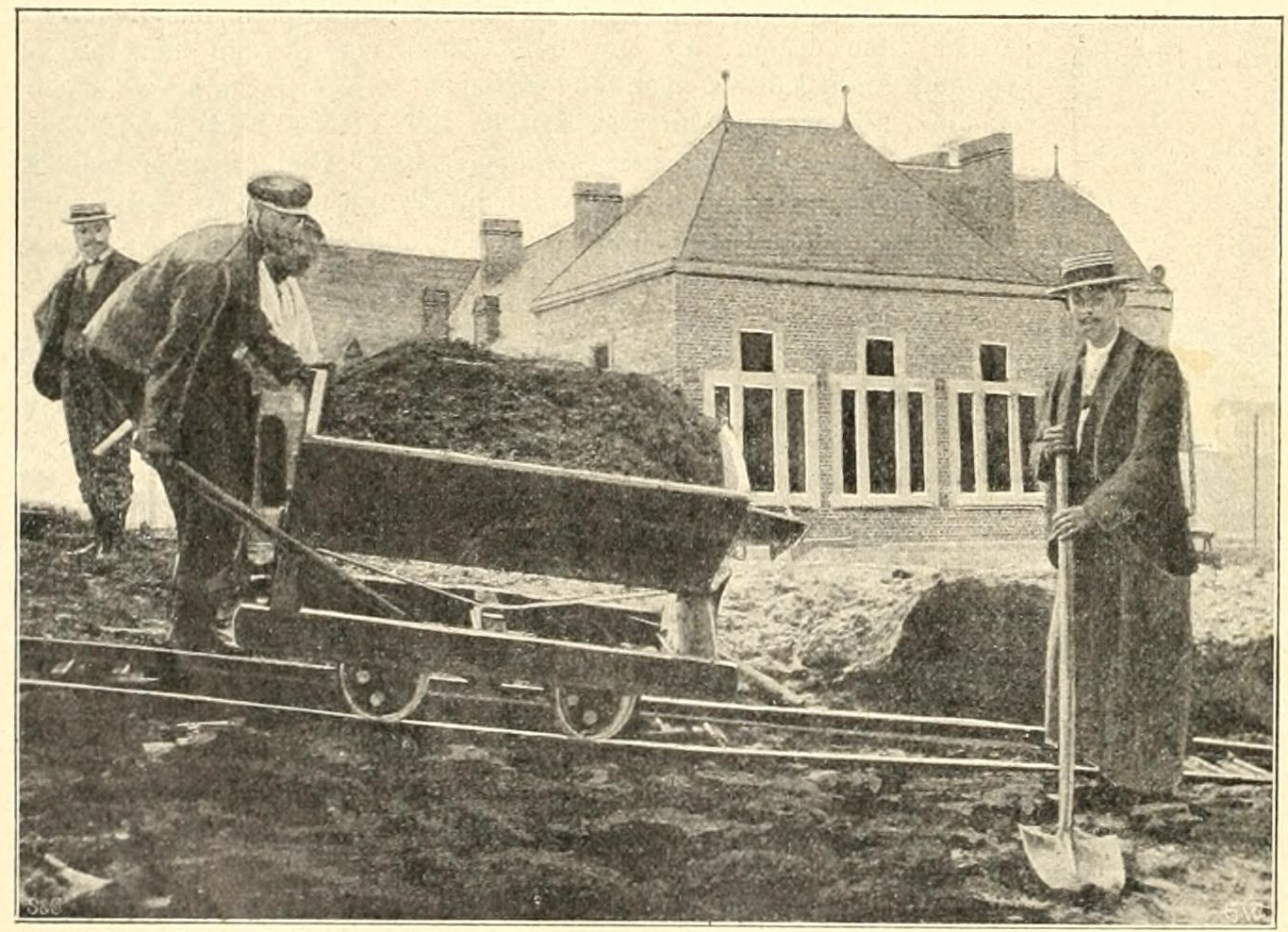
Braking with a handspike

The wooden V skip wagons had double-flange wheels and were very practical. The contents fell far enough from the rails that it did not block the track. As it tilted, all of the contents slid out of the skip without much of it, unlike what happened with other systems, remaining where it had to be shoveled out by hand. The chassis of the tippers could be used as a flat wagon for the transport of general cargo after removing the arched supports at both ends, which were just held in place by a stud and some screws.

The wagons were available with or without brakes as required. The brake was operated using a lever and acted simultaneously and evenly on all four wheels, to bring the car or train quickly to a halt. For cars without a brake, a simple wooden handspike was sufficient even in heavily graded terrain. The cars were unusually light. The weight of a car was 200 kilograms (440 lb), while an iron wagon of the same size and load capacity weighed twice as much, so the workers always had to push 200 kg of dead extra load.

The chassis and the tilting bodies were made of the best pine wood and were of so simple a design that they could easily be repaired by any blacksmith or carpenter if damaged.

== Report on field trials by a landscape gardener from Aachen ==
W. Kiehl, a professional gardener from Aachen, successfully tested a Spalding Railway in a nursery beginning early 1903. He was able to lay a track over a distance of 250 m over uneven terrain with three men in three hours, although the individual sections had to be collected from various places. He did not use any bolts to connect the fishplates, partly because he had not ordered any.

The rolling stock and track building material was so strong that repairs were rarely necessary, except for damage caused by the workers' imprudence. Thus repairs which would have caused extra costs had not been necessary during a whole year of daily operation in Aachen. W. Kiehl thus recommended this railway in the warmest terms to any landscape gardener who had to carry out earthworks. It could readily be seen how easily and cost-effectively this system could be used, because it had been made by professionals for professionals.

== Sugar beet train at Wesselburen ==
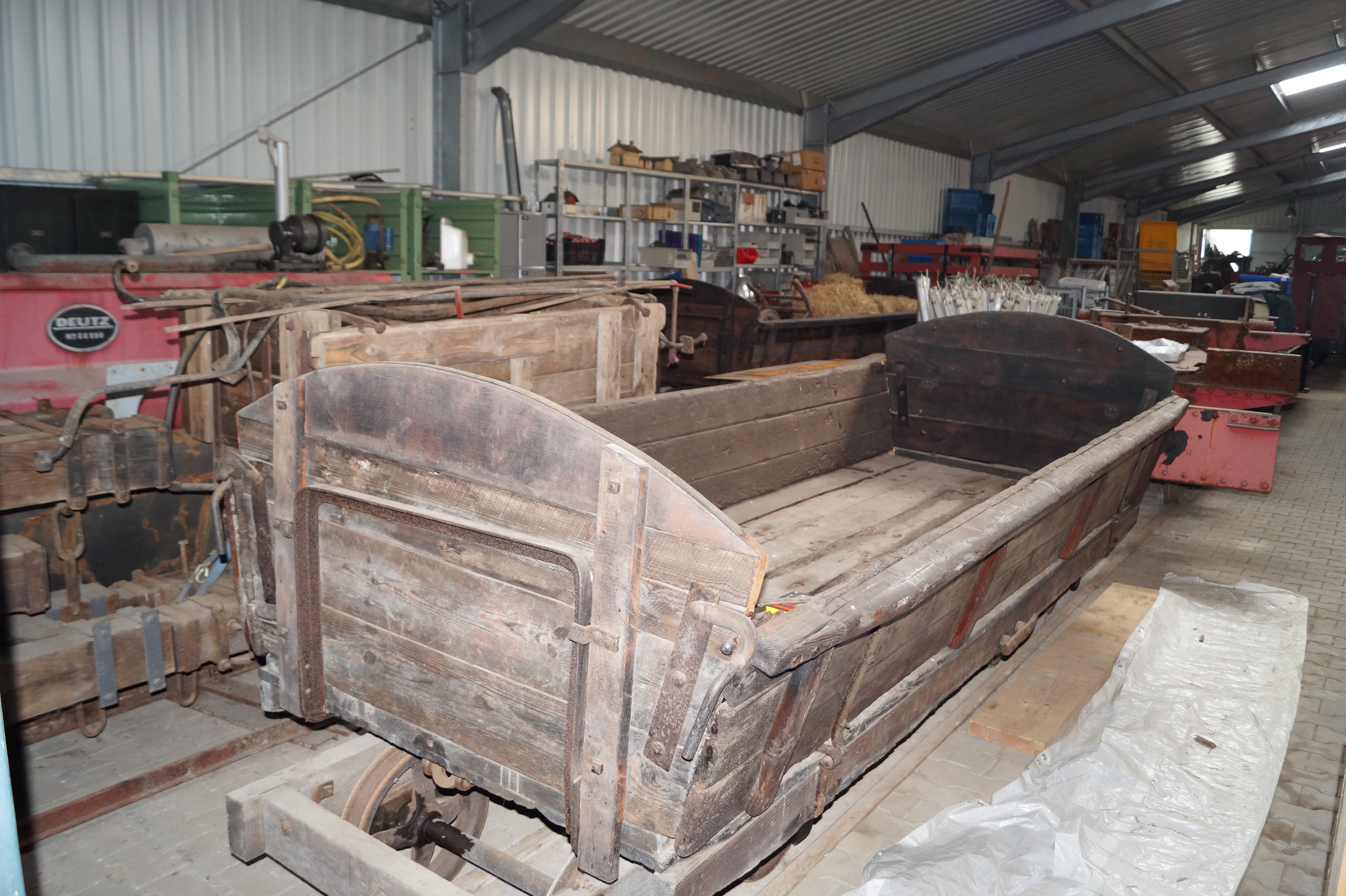
Sugar beet wagon with double-flange wheels in the Frankfurter Feldbahnmuseum

A 2,500-metre-long (2,700 yd) 600 mm (1 ft 11 5/8 in) gauge Spaldingbahn was laid in 1883 from Osterhof railway station on the Heide–Büsum railway to the Osterhof estate of a sugar beet grower and sugar manufacturer of Wesselburen in Büsum. In 1883 it carried daily up to 300 t of sugar beets. The bogies of the wagons had four axles with double-flanged wheels and a load capacity of 3 tons (60 quintals). Two of those cars are still preserved in the Frankfurter Feldbahnmuseum, one of them with the original bogies with double-flanged wheels.

== Cost–benefit analysis ==
According to the newspaper of the Association of German Railway Administrations, in 1883 the track cost around 5 marks per meter (5,47 marks per yard), the installation costs, rolling stock and other equipment amounted to about 5,000 marks, so that providing a railway 3,000 metres (1.9 mi) long required an investment of 20,000 marks. On one such track, which was set-up on the estate of Count H., 6 horses were used to transport about 3,200 t of sugar beet in 40 days. Since an ordinary four-horse cart could carry 6¼ t a day, it would have taken 12½ teams to do the same job during the same time span using conventional carts. Thus 11 four-horse teams were not needed and since each of these would have cost 10 marks for each of the 40 working days, the total savings in one campaign amounted to 4,400 marks, or 22% of the total investment capital.

The cost for laying a forestry railway was estimated at 20 marks per kilometer (32 marks per mile) in 1886.

== Comparison with the Decauville railway ==
The main differences compared to the Decauville railway were:

- Standard length of the track panels of 2 m instead of 5 m (78" instead of 197")
- Universal switches with double-headed rail profiles instead of Vignoles rails
- V skip wagons made of pine wood instead of metal
- Double-flanged wheels instead of the usual single flanged wheels
- Rails bolted to wooden sleepers instead of being riveted to steel sleepers
- Self-locking rail joints

== Patent ==
- H. A. Spalding of Jahnkow near Langenfelde, Western Pomerania: Neuerungen an transportablen Schienenwegen oder Feldeisenbahnen. Patent N° 28074 of 24 July 1884 of the Imperial Patent Office of Germany.
