= Marsh Railway =

Main line in the state of Schleswig-Holstein in Germany

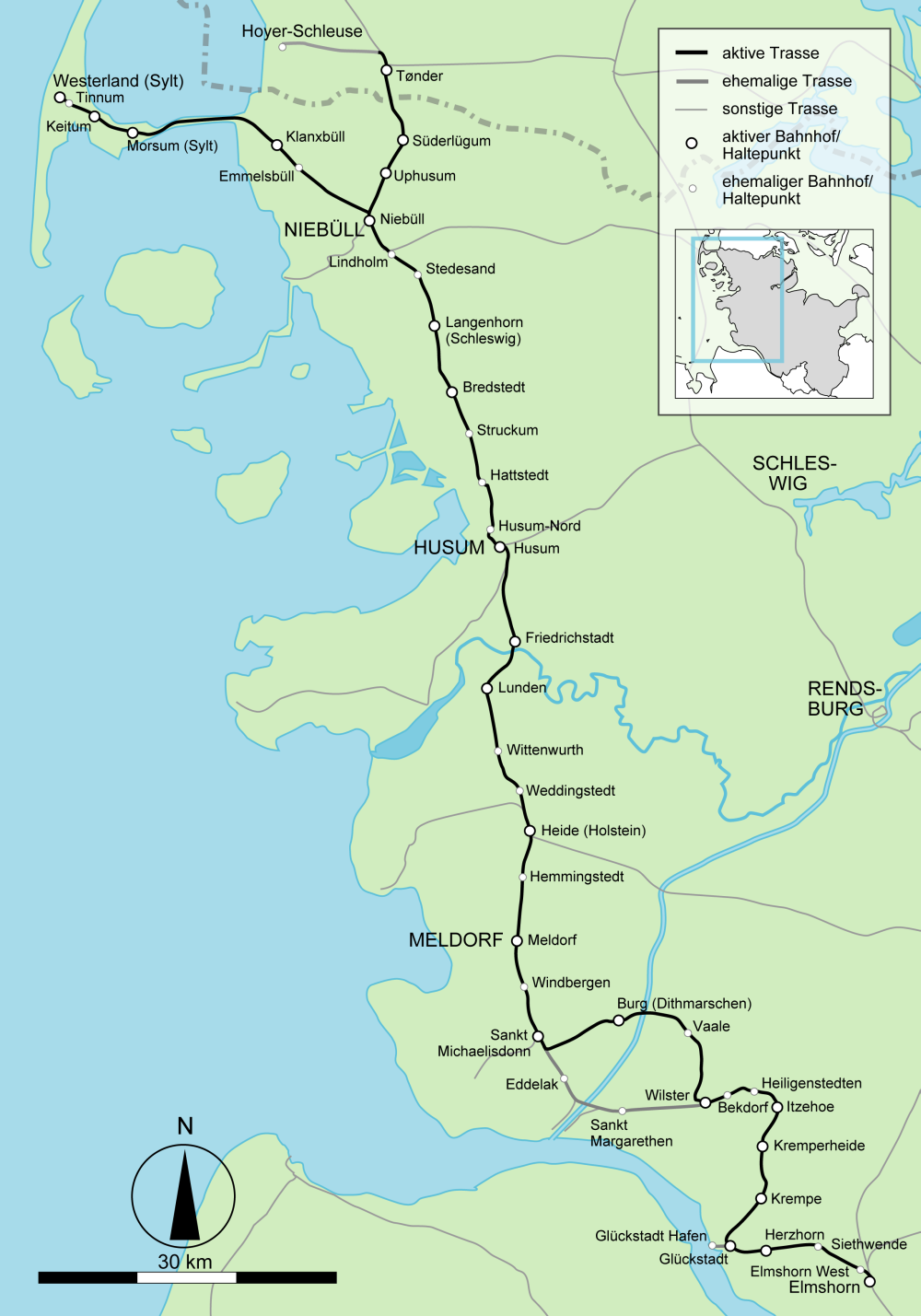

Overview
- Native name: Marschbahn
- Line number: 1210 (NOB); 96 (NEG, border–Tønder)
- Locale: Schleswig-Holstein, Germany

Service
- Route number: 103 (Elmshorn–Itzehoe); 130 (Elmshorn–Westerland)

Technical
- Line length: 211.1 km (131.2 mi)
- Number of tracks: 2: Morsum–Klanxbüll; 2: Niebüll–Bredstedt; 2: Hattstedt–Husum Nord; 2: Husum–northern Eider Bridge; 2: southern Eider Bridge–Elmshorn
- Track gauge: 1,435 mm (4 ft 8 1/2 in) standard gauge
- Electrification: (Elmshorn–Itzehoe) 15 kV/16.7 Hz AC overhead catenary

The Marsh Railway (German: Marschbahn) is a main line in the state of Schleswig-Holstein in Germany that links the stations of Elmshorn in the south and Westerland on the island of Sylt in the north. It is part of 237 km (147 mi) long route from Hamburg-Altona to Westerland (Sylt) and is listed in the Deutsche Bahn timetables as Kursbuchstrecke 130. The first part of it was opened in 1845 and is one of the oldest railway lines in Germany.

== Route ==
The Marsh Railway, as its name suggests, mainly runs through marshlands. There are also some sections of the line that run through the higher-lying geest. The line branches off the Hamburg-Altona-Kiel railway line in Elmshorn. From Elmshorn, it runs in an arc via Glückstadt to Itzehoe. The line then crosses the Kiel Canal on the 42 m (138 ft) high Hochdonn High Bridge. The bridge's total length is 2,218 m (7,277 ft) and its main span over the channel is 143 m (469 ft) long. There is also a bascule bridge north of Husum station. Between Klanxbüll and Morsum stations the line runs across the Hindenburgdamm (causeway) through the North Frisian mudflats.

== History ==
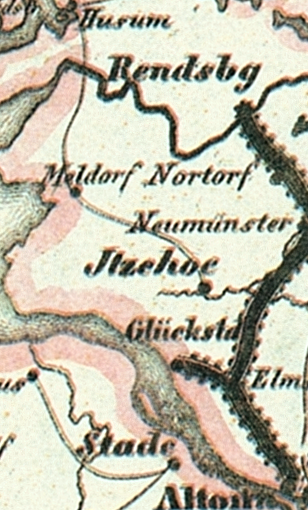
Rail network 1849

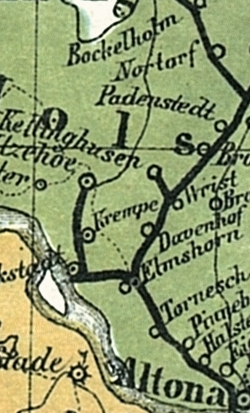
Rail network 1861

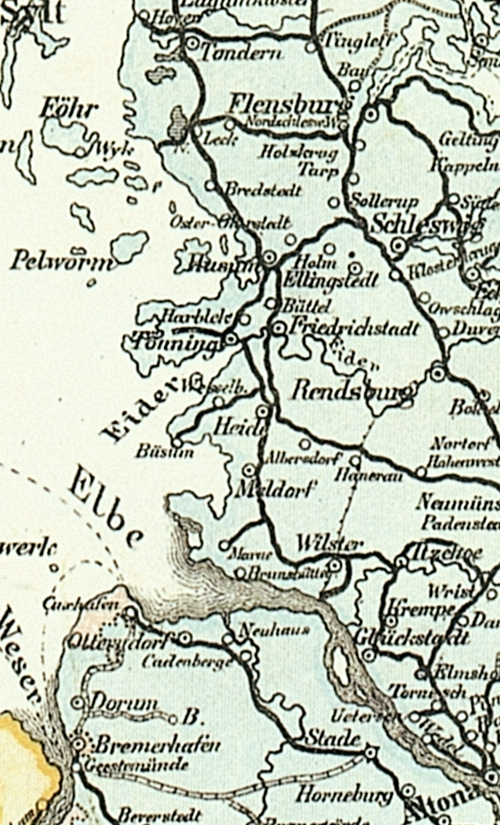
Rail network 1899

The first section of the current Marsh Railway was built by the Glückstadt-Elmshorner Eisenbahn-Gesellschaft (Glückstadt-Elmshorn Railway Company; GEEG) from a junction with the Altona–Kiel Railway at Elmshorn to the port at Glückstadt on 20 July 1845, the last section in Glückstadt being realigned in 1857 and extended to the edge of the River Stör in Itzehoe. In 1878, a swing bridge was built across the Stör to Heide (Holst).

Construction then began on an extension via Lunden and a bridge over the River Eider near Friedrichstadt to Husum, opening in 1887 and replacing a cross-river ferry service across the Eider between Tönning and Karolinenkoog. The Marsh Railway was extended further north to Bredstedt that October and to Niebüll the month following before terminating at Tondern (now Tønder), connecting with a branch line to Hoyerschleuse (now Højer Sluse), which in turn provided a ferry connection to the island of Sylt.

In the background of these extensions, the GEEG began to go through ownership changes from 1 January 1879 when it became part of the Holsteinische Marschbahn-Gesellschaft (Holstein Marsh Railway Company), which in turn was renamed as the Schleswig-Holsteinische Marschbahn-Gesellschaft (Schleswig-Holstein Marsh Railway Company) in 1888. On 1 July 1890, the company was acquired by the Prussian government and the railway network became part of the Prussian State Railways.

When the Kaiser Wilhelm Canal was opened in 1895, the Marsh Railway initially continued to run directly between Wilster and Averlak with a new swing bridge. However, as the canal was widened a much larger bridge was required to cross it, resulting in the construction of the Hochdonn High Bridge which opened in 1920, becoming Germany's fourth-largest railway bridge by spanning 2,218 m (7,277 ft) in length. The new bridge also resulted in the railway's diversion by an additional 5.8 km (3.6 mi) to the route.

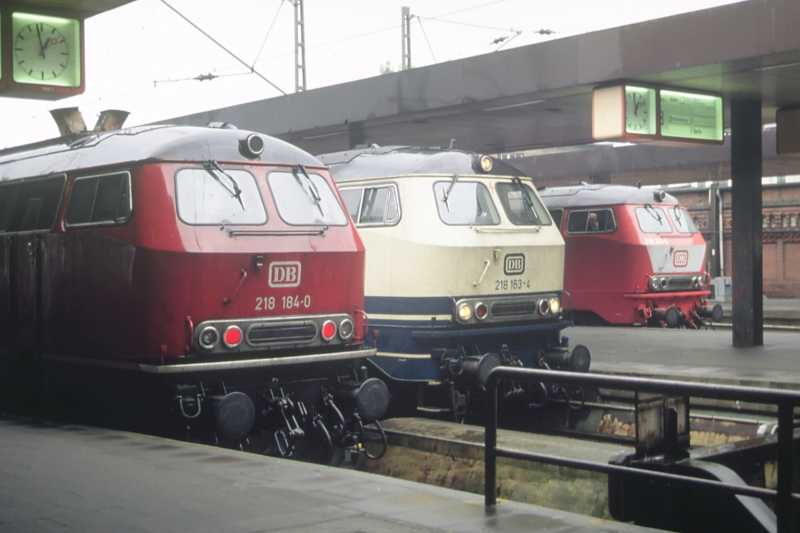
DB Class 218 locomotives at Hamburg-Altona station in 1990

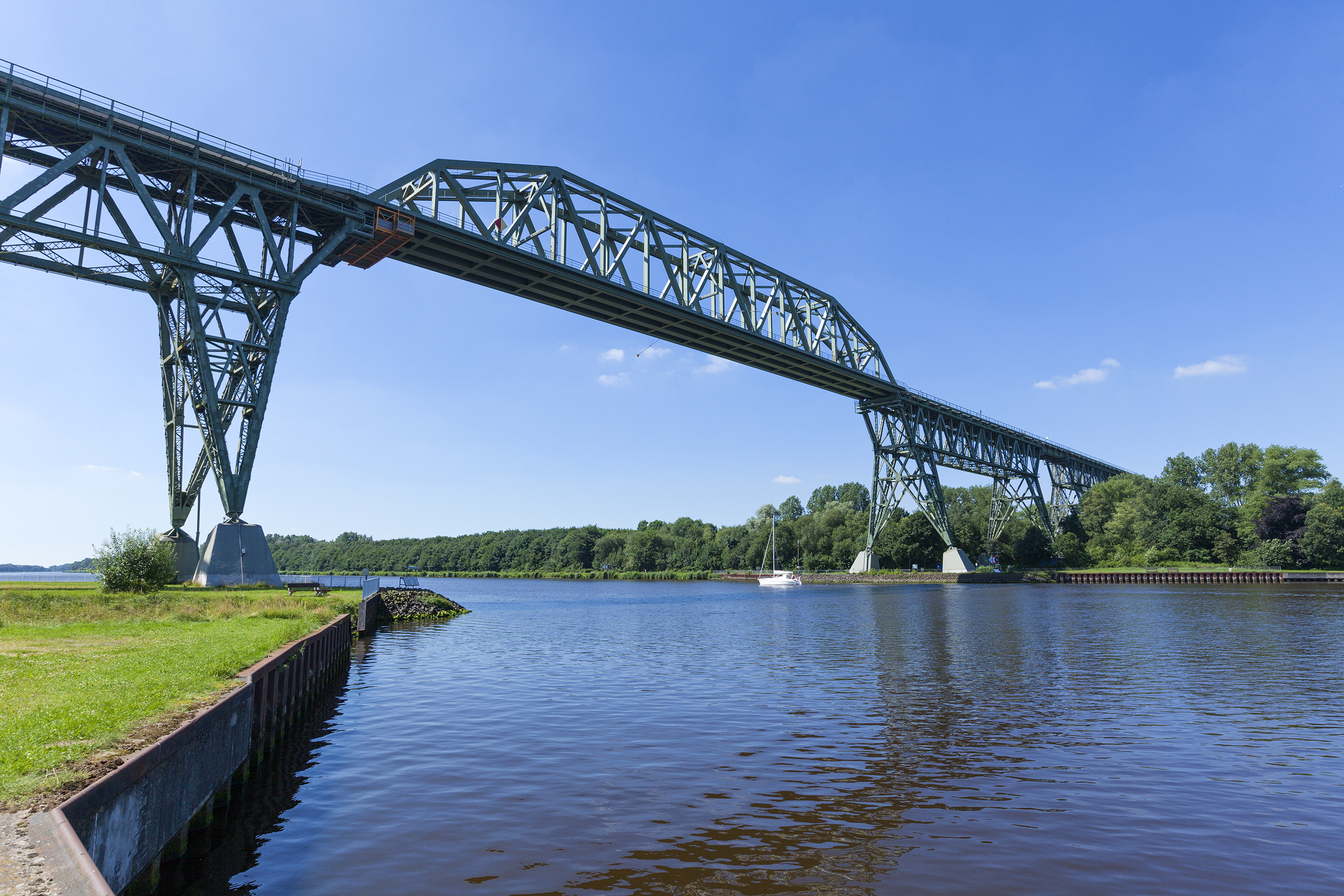
The Hochdonn High Bridge seen from the Kiel Canal

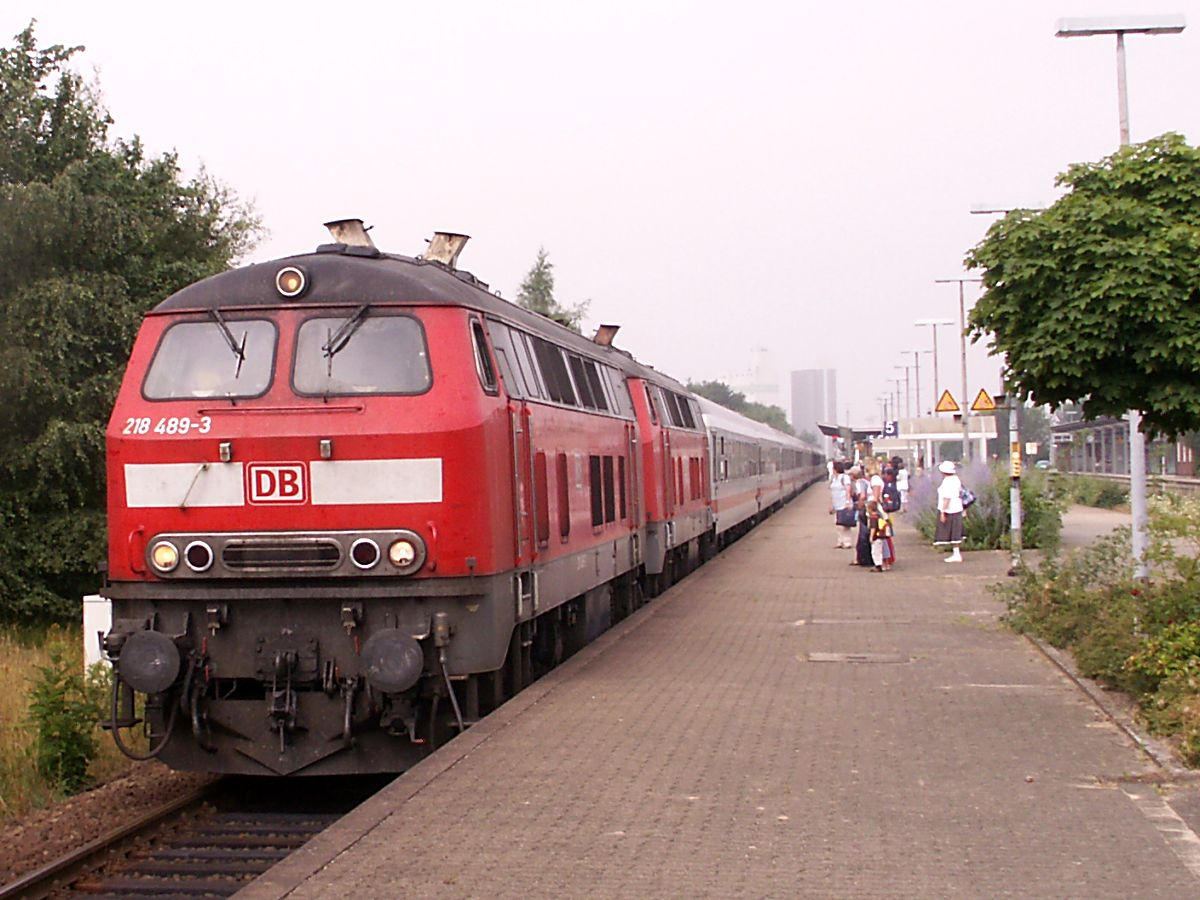
A Class 218 locomotive at Husum on an Intercity service

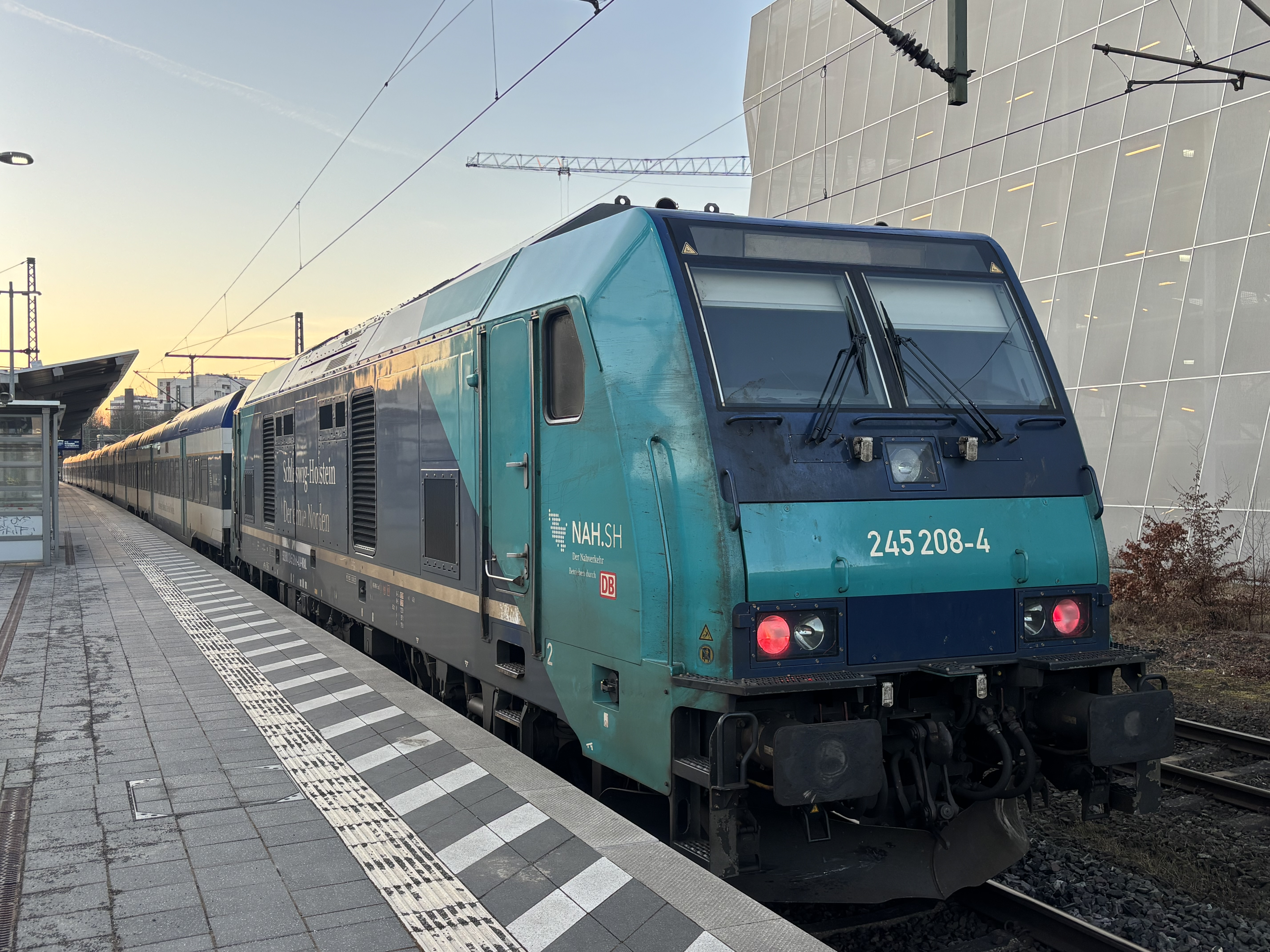
A DB Class 245 locomotive at Pinneberg station, which runs the RegionalExpress train to Westerland

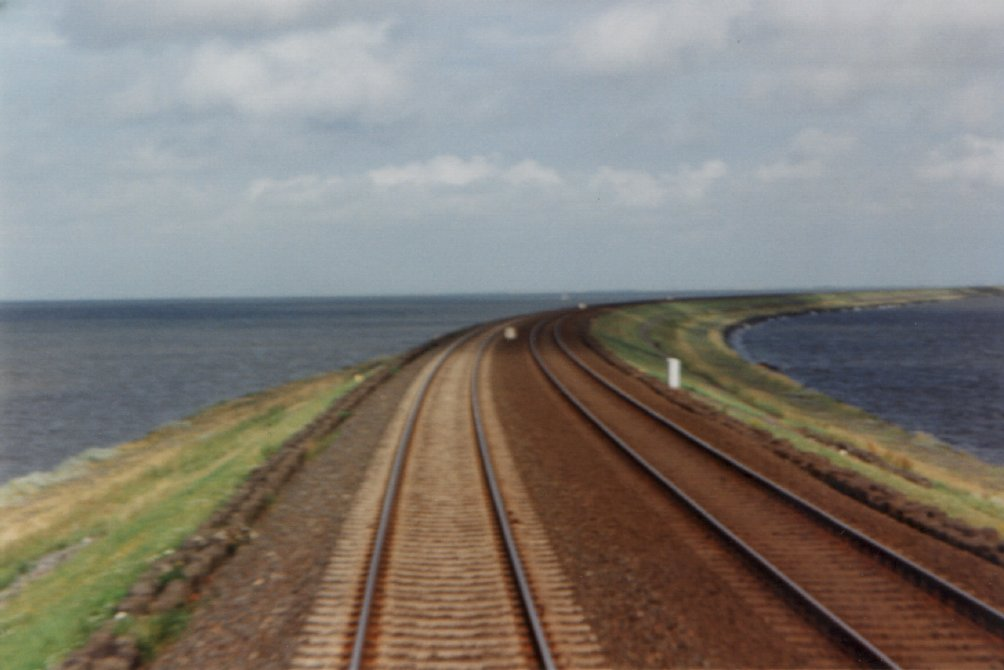
The Hindenburg Causeway

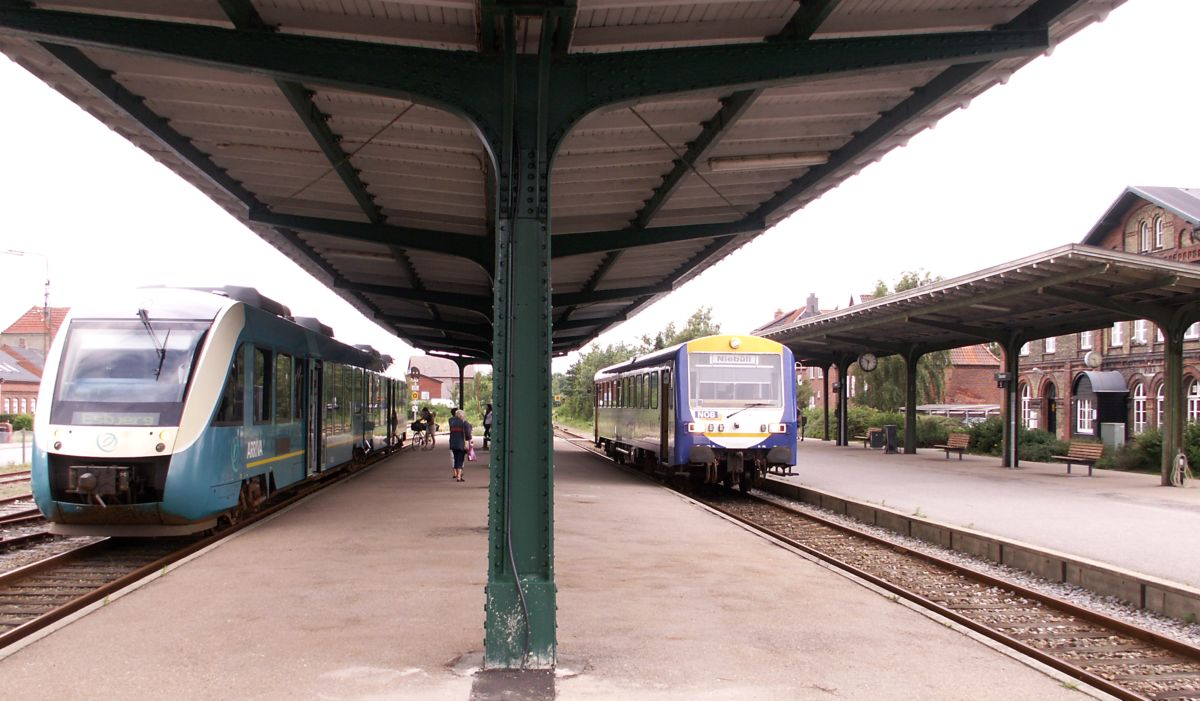
Tønder station

Following two referendums after the First World War, as mandated by terms of the Treaty of Versailles, in 1920 northern Schleswig became part of Denmark, and the border was established between Niebüll and Tønder. This meant that passenger traffic to Sylt had to cross the German-Danish border twice, requiring a Danish visa. A transit agreement was reached in 1922 allowing Sylt passenger services to continue by locking the train doors, which avoided customs inspections. This was, however, only intended as a temporary solution.

As Sylt became more popular as a tourist destination, the Deutsche Reichsbahn (German Realm Railway) already proposed to build a causeway across the Wadden Sea from Hoyerschleuse, permitting the Marsh Railway's extension to Westerland, but after the new Danish border was established a new route had to be built from Niebüll, with an initial extension being built to Klanxbull in 1922 to facilitate the transport of materials and workers. Construction began in 1923 and the 11.3 km (7.0 mi) long causeway was named as the Hindenburgdamm after President Paul von Hindenburg who also officially opened the structure on 1 June 1927.

As a result, the Sylter Inselbahn (Sylt Island Railway) lost its traffic between Munkmarsch and Westerland since the ferry service linking to the mainland had ceased. Meanwhile, rapidly increasing car ownership led to the establishment of a car-carrying train between Westerland and Niebüll, with up to ten of these services running daily by 1958.

Despite dieselisation of the Marsh Railway beginning in the 1950s, Class 01.10 steam locomotive-hauled passenger services continued until 1972 when these were replaced by Class 218 diesel locomotives. That year also saw the double-tracking of the Hindenburgdamm Causeway to accommodate additional traffic.

== Current and future operations ==
DB Regio primarily operates the hourly Regional-Express RE6 service between Hamburg-Altona and Westerland as contracted by Schleswig-Holstein's public transport authority NAH.SH, with its current contract running from December 2025 until December 2034. These are run by a fleet of Class 245 diesel locomotives in push-pull operation. DB Regio also operates local Regionalbahn RB66 between Itzehoe and Heide (Holst) as well as connecting branch line services from the Marsh Railway using a fleet of 90 Bombardier-built diesel multiple units.

DB Fernverkehr operated Intercity trains from Westerland to a range of destinations, including Hamburg, Münster, Düsseldorf and Cologne. These were operated by Class 218 diesel locomotives as far as Itzehoe, with Class 101 electric locomotives taking over southwards. On 1 May 2026, these Intercity services were taken over by ICE L sets hauled by dual-mode Class 248.5 Vectrons and redesignated as Intercity Express services. From the summer of 2026, they will also serve Berlin and Frankfurt.

On 12 May 2025, electrification of the 176 km (109 mi) section of the unelectrified route between Itzehoe and Westerland commenced alongside the 26 km (16 mi) diversionary route between Jübek and Husum, due to be completed in the early 2030s.

Planning is underway to double-track a 14 km (8.7 mi) single-track section of the Marsh Railway between Niebüll and Klanxbüll to increase line speed and capacity.
