= List of former German railway companies =

This list contains an overview of the railway companies in Germany and German colonies that no longer exist. These include railway units that have no independent legal status.

For railway companies in existence today, see the List of German railway companies.

For the chronological order in which the first railways appeared in Germany see the List of the first German railways to 1870.

== State railways ==
=== State railways (Länderbahnen) in the German Empire (to 1918/1919) ===
- Prussian state railways (Preußische Staatseisenbahnen) (from 1896 United Prussian and Hessian State Railways (Vereinigte Preußische und Hessische Staatseisenbahnen)
- Royal Bavarian State Railways (Königlich Bayerische Staats-Eisenbahnen or K.Bay.Sts.B.)
  - Ludwig South-North Railway (Ludwig-Süd-Nord-Bahn)
  - Ludwig's Western Railway (Ludwigs-West-Bahn)
  - Bavarian Maximilian Railway (Bayerische Maximiliansbahn)
- Royal Saxon State Railways (Königlich Sächsische Staatseisenbahnen or K.Sächs.Sts.E.B.)
- Royal Württemberg State Railways (Königlich Württembergische Staats-Eisenbahnen or K.W.St.E.)
- Baden State Railways (Badische Staatseisenbahnen, 1840–1920)
- Grand Duchy of Hesse State Railways (Großherzoglich Hessische Staatseisenbahnen, from 1896 the United Prussian and Hessian State Railways (Vereinigte Preußische und Hessische Staatseisenbahnen)
- Grand Duchy of Mecklenburg Friedrich-Franz Railway (Großherzoglich Mecklenburgische Friedrich-Franz-Eisenbahn or MFFE)
- Grand Duchy of Oldenburg State Railways (Großherzoglich Oldenburgische Staatseisenbahnen or G.O.E., 1867–1920)
- Bremen State Railway (Bremer Staatsbahn, private railway in Prussia owned by the Free Hanseatic City of Bremen, hence listed twice)
- Imperial Railways in Alsace-Lorraine (Reichseisenbahnen in Elsaß-Lothringen)

=== Other state railways before the founding of the Reich in 1871 ===
- Royal Hanoverian State Railways (Königlich Hannöversche Staatseisenbahnen, to 1866)
- Duchy of Brunswick State Railway (Herzoglich Braunschweigische Staatseisenbahn, to 1870)
- Nassau State Railway (Nassauische Staatsbahn, to 1866)
- Anhalt Leopold Railway (Anhaltische Leopoldsbahn, to 1871)
- Bebra–Hanau Railway (Bebra-Hanauer Eisenbahn, Kurhessian state railway, to 1866)
- Frankfurt–Bebra railway (Frankfurt-Bebraer Eisenbahn)
- Frankfurt–Offenbach Railway (Frankfurt-Offenbacher Eisenbahn)
- Royal Westphalian Railway Company (Königlich-Westfälische Eisenbahn-Gesellschaft)
- Main–Weser Railway (Main-Weser-Bahn)
- Main-Neckar Railway (Main-Neckar-Eisenbahn)
- Prussian Northern Railway (Preußische Nordbahn)
- Prussian Eastern Railway (Preußische Ostbahn)
- Saarbrücken Railway (Saarbrücker Eisenbahn)

=== State railways after 1920 ===
- Deutsche Reichsbahn (1920 to 1949), from 1924 to 1937 Deutsche Reichsbahn-Gesellschaft
  - Southwest German Railways (Betriebsvereinigung der Südwestdeutschen Eisenbahnen) (SWDE)
  - Railways of the Saarland (Eisenbahnen des Saarlandes) (EdS)
- Deutsche Reichsbahn in the GDR (DR, 1949 to 1993)
- Deutsche Bundesbahn (DB, 1949 to 1993)

== Private railway companies ==
=== A–C ===
- Aachen-Neuß-Düsseldorfer Eisenbahn-Gesellschaft
- Aachener Industriebahn
- Bavarian Eastern Railway Company (AG der Bayerischen Ostbahnen)
- AG für Bahn-Bau und -Betrieb
- AG Lokalbahn Lam-Kötzting
- AG für Verkehrswesen
- Ahaus-Enscheder Eisenbahn AG
- Albertsbahn AG (Dresden-Tharandt)
- Allgemeine Deutsche Eisenbahn-Betriebs-GmbH (ADEG)
- Allgemeine Deutsche Kleinbahn-Gesellschaft AG (ADKA)
- Altdamm-Colberger Eisenbahn-Gesellschaft
- Altenburg-Zeitzer Eisenbahngesellschaft
- Altona-Kieler Eisenbahn-Gesellschaft
- Angeln Bahn GmbH
- Arnstadt-Ichtershausener Eisenbahn
- Badische Lokal-Eisenbahnen AG
- Bergisch-Märkische Eisenbahn-Gesellschaft
- Berlin-Anhaltische Eisenbahn-Gesellschaft
- Berlin-Dresdener Eisenbahn-Gesellschaft
- Berlin-Frankfurter Eisenbahn-Gesellschaft
- Berlin-Görlitzer Eisenbahn-Gesellschaft
- Berlin-Hamburger Eisenbahn-Gesellschaft
- Berlin-Stettiner Eisenbahn-Gesellschaft
- Birkenfelder Eisenbahn GmbH
- Bonn-Cölner Eisenbahn-Gesellschaft
- Brandenburgische Städtebahn AG
- Braunschweig-Schöninger Eisenbahn AG
- Braunschweigische Landes-Eisenbahn-Gesellschaft
- Bremen State Railway (Bremer Staatsbahn, private railway in Prussia owned by the Free Hanseatic City of Bremen, hence shown twice)
- Breslau-Schweidnitz-Freiburger Eisenbahn-Gesellschaft
- Brölthaler Eisenbahn-Actien-Gesellschaft
- BVO Bahn GmbH
- Centralverwaltung für Secundairbahnen Herrmann Bachstein GmbH
  - Hohenebra-Ebelebener Eisenbahn (siehe Bahnstrecke Hohenebra–Ebeleben)
  - Greußen-Ebeleben-Keulaer Eisenbahn (siehe Bahnstrecke Hohenebra–Ebeleben)
- Chemnitz-Aue-Adorfer Eisenbahn-Gesellschaft
- Chemnitz-Komotauer Eisenbahn-Gesellschaft
- Chemnitz-Riesaer Eisenbahn-Gesellschaft
- Chemnitz-Würschnitzer Eisenbahngesellschaft
- ConTrain GmbH
- Cöln-Mindener Eisenbahn-Gesellschaft, siehe Köln-Mindener Eisenbahn-Gesellschaft
- Continentale Eisenbahn- Bau- und Betriebs- Gesellschaft
- Cottbus-Großenhainer Eisenbahn
- Crefeld-Kreis Kempener Industrie-Eisenbahn-Gesellschaft
- Cronberger Eisenbahn-Gesellschaft
- Cuxhavener Eisenbahn

=== D–F ===
- Dahme-Uckroer Eisenbahn AG
- Dessau-Wörlitzer Eisenbahn-Gesellschaft
- Deutsche Eisenbahn-Betriebsgesellschaft AG (DEBG)
- Deutsche Eisenbahn-Gesellschaft AG (DEAG) (DEGA)
- Dortmund-Märkische Eisenbahn Gesellschaft
- Düsseldorf-Elberfelder Eisenbahn-Gesellschaft
- EBM Cargo GmbH & Co. KG
- Eckernförder Kreisbahnen (Eckernförde–Kappeln)
- Eisenbahn-Gesellschaft Darmstadt (Siehe)
- Eisenbahn-Gesellschaft Greifswald-Grimmen
- Eisenbahn-Gesellschaft Mühlhausen-Ebeleben
- Eisenbahn-Gesellschaft Stralsund-Tribsees
- Eisenbahn-Zweckverband Rastenberg-Hardisleben
- Eisern-Siegener Eisenbahn AG
- Elmshorn-Barmstedt-Oldesloer Eisenbahn AG
- Elztalbahn der Stadt Waldkirch
- Erzgebirgische Eisenbahngesellschaft
- Eutin-Lübecker Eisenbahn-Gesellschaft
- Filderbahn (Stuttgart und südliches Umland)
- Frankfurt-Hanauer Eisenbahn-Gesellschaft
- Freien Grunder Eisenbahn AG
- Friedrich-Wilhelms-Nordbahn-Gesellschaft

=== G–K ===
- Gera-Meuselwitz-Wuitzer Eisenbahn AG
- Gernrode-Harzgeroder Eisenbahn-Gesellschaft
- Glasow-Berlinchener Eisenbahn-Gesellschaft
- Glückstadt-Elmshorner Eisenbahn-Gesellschaft, later Holsteinische- or Schleswig-Holsteinische Marschbahn-Gesellschaft
- Gößnitz-Geraer Eisenbahn-Gesellschaft
- Gotha-Ohrdrufer Eisenbahn-Gesellschaft
- Greiz–Brunner Eisenbahn-Gesellschaft
- Großenhainer Zweigbahn
- Güstrow-Plauer Eisenbahn-Gesellschaft (see Güstrow–Meyenburg railway)
- Hainichen-Rossweiner Eisenbahn-Gesellschaft
- Halberstadt-Blankenburger Eisenbahn-Gesellschaft
- Halle-Sorau-Gubener Eisenbahn-Gesellschaft
- Hamburg-Bergedorfer Eisenbahn later absorbed into Berlin-Hamburger Bahn
- Hannover-Altenbekener Eisenbahn-Gesellschaft
- Heisterbacher Talbahn-Gesellschaft
- Hessian Ludwig Railway Company (Hessische Ludwigs-Eisenbahn-Gesellschaft)
- Hessische Nordbahn
- Hildesheim-Peiner Kreis-Eisenbahn-Gesellschaft
- Hochstadt-Stockheimer Eisenbahn
- Hof-Egerer Eisenbahn
- Hohenebra-Ebelebener Eisenbahn
- Homburger Eisenbahn-Gesellschaft
- Hoyaer Eisenbahn-Gesellschaft
- Jever-Carolinensieler Eisenbahn
- Karsdorfer Eisenbahngesellschaft GmbH (KEG)
- Kerkerbachbahn AG (German language article)
- Kiel-Eckernförde-Flensburger Eisenbahn-Gesellschaft
- Kirchheimer Eisenbahn-Gesellschaft
- Köln-Bonner Eisenbahnen AG
- Köln-Krefelder Eisenbahn-Gesellschaft
- Köln-Mindener Eisenbahn-Gesellschaft
- Königsberg-Cranzer Eisenbahngesellschaft
- Krefelder Eisenbahn-Gesellschaft AG
- Kreis Altenaer Eisenbahn AG
- Kreis Oldenburger Eisenbahn AG
- Kreisbahn Eckernförde-Kappeln
- Kurfürst-Friedrich-Wilhelms-Nordbahn-Gesellschaft

=== L–N ===
- Lahrer Eisenbahn-Gesellschaft
- Lahrer Straßenbahn-Gesellschaft
- Lausitzer Eisenbahn-Gesellschaft AG (im Besitz der LAG München)
- Leipzig-Dresdner Eisenbahn-Compagnie
- Lenz & Co GmbH
- Liegnitz-Rawitscher Eisenbahn-Gesellschaft AG
- Lloydbahn Neustrelitz-Warnemünde
- Löbau-Zittauer Eisenbahn-Gesellschaft
- Lokalbahn AG (LAG München) (also:Localbahn AG)
- Lokalbahn Lam-Kötzting AG (LLK)
- Lokalbahn Deggendorf-Metten
- Lübeck-Büchener Eisenbahn (LBE)
- Märkisch-Posener Eisenbahn-Gesellschaft
- Magdeburg-Halberstädter Eisenbahngesellschaft
- Magdeburg-Leipziger Eisenbahn-Gesellschaft
- Magdeburg-Wittenbergesche Eisenbahn-Gesellschaft
- Marienburg-Mlawkaer Eisenbahn-Gesellschaft
- Mecklenburgische Friedrich-Wilhelm-Eisenbahn-Gesellschaft
- Mecklenburgische Südbahn-Gesellschaft
- Mecklenburgische Eisenbahngesellschaft
- Mehltheuer-Weidaer Eisenbahn-Gesellschaft
- Meppen-Haselünner Eisenbahn
- Mittelbadische Eisenbahnen AG
- Müllheim-Badenweiler Eisenbahn AG
- München-Augsburger Eisenbahn-Gesellschaft
- Münster-Enscheder Eisenbahn-Gesellschaft (see Münster–Gronau railway)
- Münster-Hammer Eisenbahn-Gesellschaft (see Münster–Hamm railway)
- Muldenthal-Eisenbahn-Gesellschaft
- Murgthal-Eisenbahn-Gesellschaft
- Nauendorf-Gerlebogker Eisenbahn-Gesellschaft
- Neubrandenburg-Friedländer Eisenbahn-Gesellschaft
- Neuhaldensleber Eisenbahn
- Neustadt-Dürkheimer Eisenbahn-Gesellschaft
- Neustadt-Gogoliner Eisenbahn-Gesellschaft AG
- Neustrelitz-Warnemünder Eisenbahn (Lloyd-Bahn)
- Niederländisch-Westfälische Eisenbahn
- Niederlausitzer Eisenbahn-Gesellschaft
- Niedersächsisches Landeseisenbahnamt Hannover (NLEA)
- Niederschlesisch-Märkische Eisenbahn-Gesellschaft
- Nordbrabant-Deutsche Eisenbahn-Gesellschaft (Rotterdam)
- Nordhausen-Erfurter Eisenbahn-Gesellschaft
- Nordhausen-Wernigeroder Eisenbahn-Gesellschaft

=== O–S ===
- Oberhessische Eisenbahn-Gesellschaft
- Oberlausitzer Eisenbahn-Gesellschaft
- Oberrheinische Eisenbahn-Gesellschaft
- Oschersleben-Schöninger Eisenbahn-Gesellschaft
- Ostdeutsche Eisenbahn-Gesellschaft in Königsberg
- Osterwieck-Wasserlebener Eisenbahn AG
- Ostpreußische Südbahn-Gesellschaft
- Parchim-Ludwigsluster Eisenbahn-Gesellschaft
- Paulinenaue-Neuruppiner Eisenbahn
- Peine-Ilseder Eisenbahn
- Palatinate Railway (Pfalzbahn)
  - Palatine Ludwig Railway (Pfälzische Ludwigsbahn)
  - Palatine Maximilian Railway (Pfälzische Maximiliansbahn)
  - Palatine Northern Railway Company (Gesellschaft der Pfälzischen Nordbahnen)
  - Neustadt–Dürkheim Railway Company (Neustadt-Dürkheimer Eisenbahn-Gesellschaft)
- Prignitzer Eisenbahn AG (1884–1940)
- Prinz-Wilhelm-Eisenbahn (Deilthaler Eisenbahn-Gesellschaft)
- Renchthal-Eisenbahn-Gesellschaft
- Rendsburg-Neumünstersche Eisenbahn-Gesellschaft
- Rhein-Nahe Eisenbahn-Gesellschaft
- Rhein-Sieg-Eisenbahn AG
- Rheinische Eisenbahn-Gesellschaft
- Rinteln-Stadthagener Eisenbahngesellschaft
- Ronsdorf-Müngstener Eisenbahn-Gesellschaft
- Ruhrort-Crefeld-Kreis Gladbacher Eisenbahn-Gesellschaft (see also Duisburg-Ruhrort–Mönchengladbach railway)
- Ruppiner Eisenbahn AG
- Saalbahn
- Saal-Unstrut-Eisenbahn-Gesellschaft
- Sächsisch-Bayerische Eisenbahn-Compagnie
- Sächsisch-Schlesische Eisenbahngesellschaft
- Sächsische Industriebahnen-Gesellschaft AG
- Sächsisch-Thüringische Eisenbahngesellschaft
- Schipkau-Finsterwalder Eisenbahn-Gesellschaft
- Schleswig-Holsteinische Marschbahngesellschaft
- Schleswig-Klosterkruger Eisenbahn
- Stahlbahnwerke Freudenstein
- Stargard-Cüstriner Eisenbahn-Gesellschaft
- Stargard-Posener Eisenbahn-Gesellschaft
- Stendal-Tangermünder Eisenbahn-Gesellschaft
- Südharz-Eisenbahn-Gesellschaft (Braunlage-Walkenried)
- South German Railway Company (Süddeutsche Eisenbahn-Gesellschaft) (SEG)

=== T–Z ===
- Taunus-Eisenbahn-Gesellschaft
- Thurbo (in der Schweiz weiter aktiv)
- Teuringertal-Bahn GmbH
- Thüringische Eisenbahn-AG
  - Esperstedt-Oldislebener Eisenbahn
  - Greußen-Ebeleben-Keulaer Eisenbahn (see Hohenebra–Ebeleben railway)
  - Ruhlaer Eisenbahn
  - Weimar-Berka-Blankenhainer Eisenbahn
  - Weimar-Buttelstedt-Großrudestedter Eisenbahn
  - Weimar-Rastenberger Eisenbahn
- Uetersener Eisenbahn
- Unterelbesche Eisenbahngesellschaft
- Vering & Waechter
- Vorwohle-Emmerthaler Eisenbahn-Gesellschaft
- Wandsbeker Industriebahn
- Warstein-Lippstadter Eisenbahn-Gesellschaft
- Wenigentaft-Oechsener Eisenbahn E: H.Hagemeier GmbH
- Wermelskirchen-Burger Eisenbahn-Gesellschaft
- Werra-Eisenbahn-Gesellschaft
- Wesselburen-Heider Eisenbahn-Gesellschaft
- Westdeutsche Eisenbahn-Gesellschaft
- Westholsteinische Eisenbahn-Gesellschaft
- Wiesentalbahn (Basel - Zell)
- Wittenberge-Perleberger Eisenbahn of the town of Perleberg
- Zittau-Oybin-Jonsdorfer Eisenbahn-Gesellschaft
- Zittau-Reichenberger Eisenbahn

== Light railways (Kleinbahnen) ==
(Eigenbetriebe und Privatrechtliche Gesellschaften) (Zahlreiche Kleinbahnen firmierten seit den vierziger Jahren des vorigen Jahrhunderts als Eisenbahnen)

=== A–C ===
- Allgemeine Lokal- und Straßenbahn-Gesellschaft
- Allgemeine Lokalbahn- und Kraftwerke AG (Alloka)
- Alsener Kreisbahnen E: Kreis Sonderburg
- Altlandsberger Kleinbahn AG
- Altmärkische Kleinbahn AG
- Apenrader Kreisbahn
- Aschersleben-Schneidlingen-Nienhagener Eisenbahn AG
- AG Binger Nebenbahnen
- AG Demminer Kleinbahnen Ost
- AG Demminer Kleinbahnen West
- AG für Energiewirtschaft
- AG Franzburger Kreisbahnen
- AG Franzburger Südbahn
- AG Kleinbahn Casekow-Penkun-Oder
- AG Ruhr-Lippe-Eisenbahnen
- Bad Eilsener Kleinbahn GmbH
- Bad Orber Kleinbahn AG
- Bahnverband Vechta-Cloppenburg
- Bergedorf-Geesthachter Eisenbahn AG
- Bergheimer Kreisbahn
- Bielefelder Kreisbahnen
- Billwerder Industriebahn
- Bleckeder Kleinbahn GmbH
- Bleckeder Kreisbahn
- Boizenburger Stadt- und Hafenbahn
- Bremervörde-Osterholzer Eisenbahn GmbH
- Bremisch-Hannoversche Kleinbahn AG
  - Kleinbahn Bremen-Tarmstedt
  - Kleinbahn Bremen-Thedinghausen
- Breslau–Trebnitz–Prausnitzer Kleinbahn AG
- Buckower Kleinbahn AG
- Bunzlauer Kleinbahn AG
- Burgdorfer Kreisbahnen
- Butjadinger Bahn E: Kreis Wesermarsch
- Buxtehude-Harsefelder Eisenbahn GmbH

=== D–F ===
- Delitzscher Kleinbahn AG
- Dürener Eisenbahn AG
- Eckernförder Kreisbahnen (Eckernförde–Owschlag)
- Eisenbahn-Zweckverband Rastenberg-Hardisleben
- Ernstbahn GmbH
- Eulengebirgsbahn AG
- Euskirchener Kreisbahnen
- Fischhausener Kreisbahn AG
- Flensburger Kreisbahn
- Forster Stadteisenbahn
- Frankensteiner Kreisbahn AG
- Frankfurter Lokalbahn AG
- Friedeberger Kleinbahn Eigenbetrieb des Kreises Friedeberg (Neumark)

=== G–J ===
- Gardelegen-Haldensleben-Weferlinger Eisenbahn AG
- Geilenkirchener Kreisbahnen Eigenbetrieb Kreis Geilenkirchen-Heinsberg
- Geldernsche Kreisbahn
- Gelnhäuser Kreisbahnen
  - Bad Orber Kleinbahn
  - Freigerichter Kleinbahn
  - Spessartbahn
  - Vogelsberger Südbahn
- Görlitzer Kreisbahn AG
- Göttinger Kleinbahn AG (Gartetalbahn)
- Goldbeck-Werben-Elbe Kleinbahn GmbH
- Grifte-Gudensberger Kleinbahn und Kraftwagen AG
- Guhrauer Kreisbahn AG
- Gummersbacher Kleinbahnen Stadt GM und Oberbergischer Kreis
- Haderslebener Kreisbahn
- Haffuferbahn AG
- Halle-Hettstedter Eisenbahn-Gesellschaft
- Hamburger Marschbahn E: Hansestadt Hamburg
- Hanauer Kleinbahn
- Heerwegen–Raudtener Kleinbahn AG
- Herforder Kleinbahn GmbH
- Herkulesbahn
- Hersfelder Kreisbahn
- Hohenlimburger Kleinbahn
- Hümmlinger Kreisbahn
- Industriebahn AG
  - Kleinbahn Beuel–Großenbusch
  - Kleinbahn Kaldenkirchen–Brüggen
- Insterburger Kleinbahnen
- Isergebirgsbahn AG
- Iserlohner Kreisbahn AG
- Jülicher Kreisbahn

=== K ===
- Kleinbahn-AG Bebitz-Alsleben
- Kleinbahn-AG Ellrich-Zorge
- Kleinbahn-AG Erfurt-Nottleben
- Kleinbahn AG Freest–Bergensin
- Kleinbahn-AG Gardelegen-Haldensleben-Weferlingen
- Kleinbahn-AG in Genthin
- Kleinbahn-AG Gransee-Neuglobsow
- Kleinbahn-AG Grünberg–Sprottau
- Kleinbahn AG Guttentag–Vosswalde
- Kleinbahn-AG Heudeber-Mattierzoll
- Kleinbahn AG Jauer–Maltsch
- Kleinbahn-AG Kiel-Segeberg
- Kleinbahn-AG Könnern-Rothenburg
- Kleinbahn AG Kohlfurt–Rothwasser
- Kleinbahn-AG Lüben–Kotzenau
- Kleinbahn-AG Marienwerder
- Kleinbahn-AG Neuburxdorf-Mühlberg (siehe Bahnstrecke Neuburxdorf–Mühlberg)
- Kleinbahn-AG Osterburg-Pretzier
- Kleinbahn-AG Rennsteig-Frauenwald
- Kleinbahn-AG Mockrehna–Schildau (siehe Bahnstrecke Mockrehna–Schildau)
- Kleinbahn-AG Schönberg-Nikolausdorf
- Kleinbahn-AG Selters-Hachenburg
- Kleinbahn-AG Tangermünde–Lüderitz
- Kleinbahn-AG Tharau-Kreuzburg
- Kleinbahn-AG Tirschtiegel-Dürrlettel
- Kleinbahn-AG Wallwitz-Wettin
- Kleinbahn-AG Wolmirstedt-Colbitz
- Kleinbahn Bad Zwischenahn–Edewechterdamm
- Kleinbahn Bergwitz-Kemberg GmbH (siehe Bahnstrecke Bergwitz-Kemberg)
- Kleinbahn Bielstein-Waldbröl E:Kreiskommunalverband GM
- Kleinbahn Bossel-Blankenstein GmbH
- Kleinbahn Bremervörde-Osterholz GmbH
- Kleinbahn Buxtehude-Harsefeld GmbH
- Kleinbahn Celle-Soltau, Celle-Munster GmbH
- Kleinbahn Celle-Wittingen AG
- Kleinbahn Deutsch Krone-Virchow
- Kleinbahn Eckernförde-Owschlag
- Kleinbahn Eltville-Schlangenbad
- Kleinbahn Engelskirchen-Marienheide E: Oberbergischer Kreis
- Kleinbahn Ensdorf-Saarlouis-Wallerfangen-Felsberg E: Kreis Saarlouis
- Kleinbahn Farge-Wulsdorf GmbH
- Kleinbahn Freienwalde-Zehden AG
- Kleinbahn Friedeberg-Alt Libbehne GmbH
- Kleinbahn Garßen-Bergen
- Kleinbahn Gittelde-Grund GmbH
- Kleinbahn Gommern-Pretzien
- Kleinbahn Groß Ilsede-Broistedt
- Kleinbahn Groß Peterwitz-Katscher
- Kleinbahn Groß Raum-Ellerkrug GmbH
- Kleinbahn Haspe-Voerde-Breckerfeld
- Kleinbahn Horka (Wehrkirch)-Rothenburg-Priebus AG
- Kleinbahn Hoya-Syke-Asendorf GmbH
- Kleinbahn Ihrhove-Westrhauderfehn GmbH
- Kleinbahn Kirchbarkau-Preetz-Lütjenburg
- Kleinbahn Klockow-Pasewalk GmbH
- Kleinbahn Kreuz-Schloppe-Deutsch Krone E: Kreis Deutsch Krone
- Kleinbahn Küstrin-Hammer AG
- Kleinbahn Langenfeld-Monheim-Hitdorf E: Gemeinden
- Kleinbahn Lingen-Berge-Quakenbrück GmbH
- Kleinbahn Lohne-Dinklage
- Kleinbahn Lüchow-Schmarsau GmbH
- Kleinbahn Lüneburg-Soltau GmbH
- Kleinbahn Lütjenbrode-Orth (Fehmarn) der Kreis Oldenburger Eisenbahn AG
- Kleinbahn Merzig-Büschfeld GmbH
- Kleinbahn Neuhaus-Brahlstorf GmbH
- Kleinbahn Neuwied-Rasselstein-Augustenthal
- Kleinbahn Niebüll-Dagebüll AG
- Kleinbahn Opladen-Lützenkirchen E: Rhein-Wupper-Kreis
- Kleinbahn Pforzheim−Ittersbach
- Kleinbahn Piesberg-Rheine AG
- Kleinbahn Pogegen-Schmalleningken
- Kleinbahn Rees-Empel E: Stadt Rees
- Kleinbahn Rheinbrohl-Mahlberg
- Kleinbahn Siegburg-Zündorf E: Siegkreis
- Kleinbahn Soltau-Neuenkirchen GmbH
- Kleinbahn Steinhelle-Medebach GmbH
- Kleinbahn Wallersdorf–Münchshöfen
- Kleinbahn Weidenau-Deuz
- Kleinbahn Wegenstedt–Calvörde E: Gemeinde Calvörde
- Kleinbahn Wesel-Rees-Emmerich E: Kreis Rees
- Kleinbahn Winsen-Evendorf-Hützel GmbH
- Kleinbahn Winsen-Niedermarschacht GmbH
- Kleinbahn Wittingen-Oebisfelde GmbH
- Kleinbahnen des Kreises Jerichow I
- Kleinbahnen der Kreise Ost- und Westprignitz
  - Kleinbahn Kyritz-Hoppenrade-Breddin
  - Kleinbahn Lindenberg-Pritzwalk
  - Kleinbahn Lindenberg-Kreuzweg
  - Kleinbahn Pritzwalk-Putlitz
  - Kleinbahn Putlitz-Suckow
  - Kleinbahn Perleberg-Karstädt-Berge-Perleberg
  - Kleinbahn Perleberg-Hoppenrade
  - Kleinbahn Viesecke-Glöwen
- Kleinbahnabteilung des Provinzialverbandes Sachsen in Merseburg
  - Altmärkische Kleinbahn AG
  - Delitzscher Kleinbahn AG
  - Kleinbahn-AG Bebitz-Alsleben
  - Kleinbahn Bergwitz-Kemberg GmbH (siehe Bahnstrecke Bergwitz-Kemberg)
  - Kleinbahn-AG Ellrich-Zorge
  - Kleinbahn-AG Erfurt-Nottleben
  - Kleinbahn-AG Gardelegen-Haldensleben-Weferlingen
  - Kleinbahn-AG in Genthin
  - Kleinbahn-AG Heudeber-Mattierzoll
  - Kleinbahn-AG Könnern-Rothenburg
  - Kleinbahn-AG Neuburxdorf–Mühlberg (siehe Bahnstrecke Neuburxdorf–Mühlberg)
  - Kleinbahn-AG Osterburg-Pretzier
  - Kleinbahn-AG Rennsteig-Frauenwald
  - Kleinbahn-AG Mockrehna–Schildau (siehe Bahnstrecke Mockrehna–Schildau)
  - Kleinbahn-AG Wallwitz-Wettin
  - Kleinbahn-AG Wolmirstedt-Colbitz
  - Kyffhäuser Kleinbahn AG
  - Langensalzaer Kleinbahn AG
  - Obereichsfelder Kleinbahn AG
  - Prettin-Annaburger Kleinbahn AG
  - Salzwedeler Kleinbahnen GmbH
  - Stendaler Kleinbahn AG
- Kleinbahngesellschaft Anklam-Lassan
- Kleinbahngesellschaft Greifswald-Jarmen
- Kleinbahngesellschaft Greifswald-Wolgast
- Kleinbahngesellschaft Güdenhagen-Groß Möllen GmbH
- Königs Wusterhausen-Mittenwalde-Töpchiner Kleinbahn AG
- Kohlenbahn-AG Reichenau (Sachsen)
- Kreisbahn Beeskow–Fürstenwalde E: Kreis Beeskow-Storkow
- Kreisbahn Cloppenburg-Landesgrenze
- Kreisbahn Emden-Pewsum-Greetsiel E: Kreis Norden
- Kreisbahn Leer-Aurich-Wittmund
- Kreisbahn Norderdithmarschen in Heide
- Kreisbahn Osterode–Kreiensen E: Kreis Osterode (Harz) (siehe Bahnstrecke Osterode–Kreiensen)
- Kreisbahn Rathenow-Senzke-Nauen E: Kreis Westhavelland
- Kreisbahn Schönermark-Damme E: Kreise Angermünde und Prenzlau
- Kreisverkehrsbetriebe Saarlouis AG
- Kreiswerke Geilenkirchen-Heinsberg
- Kreuznacher Kleinbahnen (VKA)
- Kyffhäuser Kleinbahn AG

=== L–N ===
- Landesverkehrsamt Brandenburg (LVA)
  - Altlandsberger Kleinbahn AG
  - Buckower Kleinbahn AG
  - Friedeberger Kleinbahn
  - Jüterbog-Luckenwalder Kreiskleinbahnen (bis 15. Februar 1939) (Schmalspur)
  - Kleinbahn Freienwalde-Zehden AG
  - Kleinbahn Friedeberg-Alt Libbehne GmbH
  - Kleinbahn Küstrin-Hammer AG
  - Kreisbahn Beeskow–Fürstenwalde
  - Lehniner Kleinbahn AG
  - Müncheberger Kleinbahn
  - Oderbruchbahn AG
  - Ostprignitzer Kreiskleinbahnen
    - Kleinbahn Kyritz-Hoppenrade-Breddin (Schmalspur)
    - Kleinbahn Lindenberg-Kreuzweg (Schmalspur)
    - Kleinbahn Lindenberg-Pritzwalk (Schmalspur)
    - Kleinbahn Pritzwalk-Putlitz
    - Kleinbahn Putlitz-Suckow
  - Spreewaldbahn AG (Schmalspur)
  - Westprignitzer Kreiskleinbahnen
    - Kleinbahn Perleberg-Hoppenrade (Schmalspur)
    - Kleinbahn Perleberg-Karstädt-Berge-Perleberg
    - Kleinbahn Viesecke-Glöwen (Schmalspur)
  - Weststernberger Kreiskleinbahn
- Langensalzaer Kleinbahn AG
- Lehniner Kleinbahn AG
- Lübben-Cottbuser Kreisbahnen
- Lübeck-Segeberger Eisenbahn
- Marburger Kreisbahn
- Marienborn-Beendorfer Kleinbahn-Gesellschaft (AG)
- Mecklenburg-Pommersche Schmalspurbahn AG
- Mecklenburgische Bäderbahn (Rövershagen-Graal=Müritz)
- Memeler Kleinbahn AG
- Merzig-Büschfelder Eisenbahn
- Moselbahn AG
- Müncheberger Kleinbahn E: Stadt Müncheberg
- Nassauische Kleinbahn AG
- Neisser Kreisbahn AG
- Neumarkter Kleinbahn AG
- Niedersächsisches Landeseisenbahnamt (NLEA)
- Niederweserbahn GmbH

=== O–R ===
- Oberbergische Verkehrsgesellschaft AG
- Obereichsfelder Kleinbahn AG
- Oberweißbacher Bergbahn AG
- Oderbruchbahn AG
- Ohlauer Kleinbahn AG
- Ostpreußische Kleinbahnen AG übernahm folgende Bahnen:
  - Insterburger Kleinbahnen AG mit
    - Elchniederungsbahn
    - Kleinbahn Heydekrug–Kolleschen
    - Klb. Tilsit–Pogegen–Schmalleningken
  - Königsberger Kleinbahn AG
  - Lycker Kleinbahnen AG
  - Oletzkoer Kleinbahnen-AG
  - Ortelsburger Kleinbahn AG
  - Pillkaller Kleinbahn-AG
  - Rastenburger Kleinbahn GmbH
  - Wehlau–Friedländer Kreisbahn-AG
  - Wöterkeim–Schippenbeiler Kleinbahn-AG
- Plettenberger Kleinbahn AG
- Polkwitz–Raudtener Kleinbahn AG
- Pommersche Landesbahnen
  - Anklamer Bahn
  - Casekow-Penkuner Bahn
  - Bahnen des Kreises Deutsch Krone
  - Demminer Bahnen
  - Franzburger Bahnen (Nord)
  - Franzburger Bahnen (Süd)
  - Greifenberger Bahnen
  - Greifenhagener Bahnen
  - Greifswalder Bahnen
  - Köslin-Belgarder Bahnen
  - Kolberger Bahnen
  - Lauenburger Bahnen
  - Naugarder Bahnen
  - Pyritzer Bahnen
  - Randower Bahn
  - Regenwalder Bahnen
  - Rügensche Bahnen
  - Saatziger Bahnen
  - Schlawer Bahnen
  - Stolper Bahnen
- Prenzlauer Kreisbahnen
- Prettin-Annaburger Kleinbahn AG
- Ratzeburger Kleinbahn AG
- Reichensteiner Bahn
- Riesengebirgsbahn GmbH
- Rendsburger Kreisbahn
- Rheinisch-Westfälische Straßen- und Kleinbahnen GmbH
  - Kleinbahn Langenfeld-Monheim-Hitdorf
  - Kleinbahn Opladen-Lützenkirchen
  - Kleinbahn Rees-Empel
  - Kleinbahn Siegburg-Zündorf
  - Kleinbahn Wesel-Rees-Emmerich
  - Klever Straßenbahn
  - Straßenbahn Opladen-Ohligs
  - Wahner Straßenbahn
- Rosenberger Kreisbahn AG
- Rügensche Kleinbahn

=== S–T ===
- Saatziger Kleinbahnen AG
- Salzwedeler Kleinbahnen GmbH
- Samlandbahn AG
- St. Andreasberger Kleinbahn GmbH
- Schleizer Kleinbahn AG
- Schmalkalder Kreisbahn
- Söhrebahn AG
- Spreewaldbahn AG
- Spremberger Stadtbahn
- Steinhuder Meer-Bahn GmbH
- Stendaler Kleinbahn AG
- Strandbahn Warnemünde-Markgrafenheide E: Stadt Rostock
- Strausberg-Herzfelder Kleinbahn AG
- Südstormarnsche Kreisbahn
- Sylter Inselbahn AG
- Sylter Südbahn E: Hamburg-Amerika-Linie
- Teltower Eisenbahn AG
- Trachenberg–Militscher Kreisbahn AG
- Trusebahn AG

=== U–Z ===
- Uetersener Eisenbahn AG
- Vereinigte Kleinbahnen AG
  - Kleinbahn Neheim-Hüsten-Sundern
  - Kleinbahn Philippsheim-Binsfeld
  - Dessau-Radegast-Köthener Bahn
- Verkehrsbetriebe des Kreises Schleswig
- Vorortbahn Wilhelmshaven
- Westfälische Kleinbahnen AG
  - Kleinbahn Westig-Ihmert-Altena-Dahle
- Westfälische Provinzialverwaltung – Kleinbahnabteilung
  - Kleinbahn Steinhelle-Medebach GmbH
  - Kleinbahn Unna-Kamen-Werne GmbH
  - Kleinbahn Weidenau-Deuz GmbH
  - Tecklenburger Nordbahn AG
- Westhavelländische Kreisbahnen
- Westpreußische Kleinbahnen AG
- Wittlager Kreisbahn AG
- Wüstewaltersdorfer Kleinbahn AG
- Ziederthal-Eisenbahn-Gesellschaft AG
- Zschornewitzer Kleinbahn GmbH

== Railways outside Reich or Federal territory ==
- Eisenbahngesellschaft für Deutsch-Ostafrika
- Otavi Minen- und Eisenbahn-Gesellschaft (OMEG, in the colony of German Southwest Africa)
