= Oding =

Oding may refer to:

== People and characters ==
- Oding Paguio, Philippine politician; see List of political families in the Philippines

=== Fictional characters ===
- Oding, a fictional character from the 2022 Indonesian TV drama Menolak Talak (TV series)
- Oding, a fictional character from the 2013 Indonesian TV soap opera Magic (TV series)
- Oding, a fictional character from the 2012 Indonesian anthology horror film Hi5teria

== Other uses ==
- Overdosing (ODing), the process of having a drug overdose
- Online dating (ODing)
- Oding, composing odes

== See also ==
- OD (disambiguation)
- Ode (disambiguation)
- Odes (disambiguation)
- Oder (disambiguation)
