= Oder (disambiguation) =

The Oder is a river in Central Europe.

Oder may also refer to:

== People with the surname ==
- Glenn Oder (born 1957), American politician
- Tjaša Oder (born 1994), Slovenian swimmer

== Other uses ==
- Oder (Harz), a river in Lower Saxony, Germany
- Odeř, a village and part of Hroznětín in the Czech Republic

== See also ==
- OD (disambiguation)
- Ode (disambiguation)
- Odes (disambiguation)
- Odor (disambiguation)
- Oder Dam, a dam in Germany on the river Oder
- Szczecin Lagoon, or Oder Lagoon, in Germany and Poland
- Oder Valley Railway, Germany
