= Lüneburg–Soltau railway =

Railway line in Germany

Overview
- Line number: 9111
- Locale: Lower Saxony, Germany

Service
- Route number: formerly 162, 109b

Technical
- Line length: 57.13 km (35.50 mi)
- Track gauge: 1,435 mm (4 ft 8 1/2 in) standard gauge
- Operating speed: 60 km/h (37 mph)
- Maximum incline: 1.7%

The Lüneburg–Soltau railway is a standard gauge railway line in North Germany operated by the East Hanoverian Railways (Osthannoversche Eisenbahnen or OHE).

== History ==
After a lengthy planning phase the 57-kilometre (35 mi) long railway from Lüneburg to Soltau was opened on 13 June 1913 by the Lüneburg–Soltau Light Railway. This company had been founded on 15 February 1911 by the Prussian state, the Province of Hanover and the districts of Lüneburg and Soltau.

It ran from Lüneburg through the middle of the Lüneburg Heath via Amelinghausen-Sottorf and Hützel, where it was joined by the line from Winsen, which had been built by the Winsen–Evendorf–Hützel Light Railway. Finally it reached the railway hub of Soltau, where it share the same station as the Celle–Soltau railway and, from 1920, the Soltau–Neuenkirchen railway as well, which enabled passengers to transfer to the state railway. Running powers for the line in the period 1 June 1923 to July 1944 were the responsibility of the State Light Railway Office of the Province of Hanover. On 1 January 1944 the light railway company merged with the Soltau-Neuenkirchen Light Railway Company to form the Lüneburg-Soltau Railway Company, but this was absorbed the same year, on 11 July 1944, into the East Hanoverian Railways.

The inclines on the line are the most demanding in the OHE's network as its popular name Gebirgsbahn ('hill railway') testifies. It has a height difference of over 100 metres.

In 1973 the Soltau–Hützel section was incorporated into Celle's remotely controlled section. The signal box for this is at Soltau Süd. However, due to the decline in traffic, remote-control is superfluous and, since 2001, is no longer in use on this section. The signals in Hützel and Lüneburg Süd are meanwhile controlled by Celle. The station of Melbeck-Embsen has its own signal box with push-button routing.

== Operations ==
=== Passenger services ===
Passenger traffic was moderate in the early years. From 1932 to 1936 three Wismar railbuses were procured which handled all the passenger duties. Only schoolchildren and excursion services were operated by normal trains. The service was very modest; in 1938 there were three pairs of through trains daily, and other trains on the sections from Lüneburg to Amelinghausen and Soltau to Hützel. After 1950 five to six train pairs ran daily. Between 1950 and 1960 semi-fast railbuses (Eiltriebwagen) were introduced, running from Lüneburg via Soltau to Celle. From 28 May 1961 passenger trains called at the Deutsche Bundesbahn (DB) station in Soltau. This made it easier to catch connexions. In Lüneburg an agreement was reached with the DB to allow for a ten-minute walk to the DB station.

On 27 June 1975 passenger services between Soltau and Schwindebeck were withdrawn; the remaining passenger trains followed suit on 21 May 1977.

The Lüneburg Transport Society (Arbeitsgemeinschaft Verkehrsfreunde Lüneburg) offers trips on historic trains at weekends during the summer months and in December between Lüneburg and Hützel under the name "Heath Express" (Heide Express).

=== Goods traffic ===
To begin with the transportation of agricultural goods dominated. In Lüneburg the saltworks had a large siding and was an important customer. From the 1960s in Drögennindorf and Hambostel there were mixing plants for road construction materials; they were big customers of the railway for a period of time. The most important goods customer was the compound fertiliser factory at Embsen. They transported a million tonnes of freight and, during their peak years, made up 30 per cent of the entire freight transported by the OHE. In 1989 fertiliser production in Embsen ceased. Until then there had been three local goods trains daily on the line; since 2006 only three per week. Through traffic, too, has reduced. In 1980 there were up to four trains per day, by 2006 on the Soltau–Hützel section only three per week.
