= Odor (disambiguation) =

An odor or odour is a smell or scent.

Odor may also refer to:

- Odor (surname) or Ódor or O'Dor
- Odor Pond, Herkimer County, New York State, United States, a pond

== See also ==
- ODEUR
- Oder (disambiguation)
- OD (disambiguation)
