= Soltau–Neuenkirchen railway =

Former railway line in Lower Saxony, Germany

Overview
- Line number: 9171
- Locale: Lower Saxony, Germany

Service
- Route number: ex 209m

Technical
- Line length: 11.9 km (7.4 mi)
- Track gauge: 1,435 mm (4 ft 8 1/2 in) standard gauge

The Soltau–Neuenkirchen railway was a standard gauge line built for the East Hanoverian Railways (Osthannoversche Eisenbahnen or OHE) in North Germany.

== History ==
An extension of the Kleinbahn from Lüneburg to Soltau to Neuenkirchen or Rotenburg was contemplated even during its construction, and in 1913 the Kingdom of Prussia, the province of Hanover and the district of Soltau set aside funding to enable the Soltau–Neuenkirchen Light Railway Company to be established. Construction began in 1914, but it could not be completed during the First World War. That said, there was a provisional service from the beginning of 1917, but it was not until 15 May 1920 that the line was officially opened.

Running powers on the line were granted to the Lüneburg–Soltau light railway, which provided locomotives and, later, staff. On 1 June 1923 responsibility for operations on both lines was transferred to the state light railway office in Hanover. By 1928 the few passenger services were withdrawn, because only around 5,300 passengers were recorded annually. In fact statistics showed that small numbers of passengers continued to use the line even after that date, because clearly it was possible to travel in the guard's van on goods trains. On 1 January 1944 the two Kleinbahns merged into the Lüneburg-Soltau Railway Company, which in turn became part of the East Hanover Railways on 6 June 1944.

After the Second World War regular passenger services started up again on 1 April 1947; five to six pairs of trains ran daily on work days and three to four pairs on Sundays. These services ceased on 28 May 1961 when the passenger station at Soltau Süd was closed. Whilst the OHE trains from Lüneburg and Celle were still able to run into the DB station, this would only have been possible for trains from Neuenkirchen if they reversed in and out again.

Goods traffic was always moderate; it was limited mainly to agricultural products and supplies for country traders. On 15 January 1986 all services were withdrawn; on 1 April 1996 the line was officially closed and it was lifted in 2006.
