= ODS =

ODS may refer to:

== Computing, Internet and information technology ==
- Files-11 (On-Disk Structure), a DEC filesystem
- Office of Digital Strategy, Executive Branch of the White House
- OpenDocument Spreadsheet file format
- Online dating service
- Operational data store, an intermediate data warehouse for databases
- OpenDNSSEC, a security extension of DNS Protocol
- Optical data storage a technology for storing information

== Science and technology ==
- Octadecylsilyl, also known as C18, a surface coating used in reversed-phase chromatography
- Oxide dispersion strengthened alloys
- Ozone-depleting substance, chemicals which contribute to ozone depletion
- Osmotic demyelination syndrome, a neurological condition involving severe damage to the myelin sheath of nerve cells
- Obstructed defecation syndrome, a major cause of functional constipation

== Military operations ==
- Operation Defensive Shield
- Operation Desert Storm

== Other ==
- Civic Democratic Party (Czech: Občanská demokratická strana)
- Civic Democratic Party (Slovakia) (Slovak: Občianska demokratická strana)
- Odesa International Airport, an airport in Odesa, Ukraine (IATA code ODS)
- L'Officiel du jeu Scrabble, the reference dictionary for Scrabble in French-speaking countries
- One Day School, a gifted education program in New Zealand.
- Operating Deflection Shape, a method used for visualisation of the vibration pattern of a machine
- Ordbog over det danske Sprog, a dictionary of Danish
- Overdoses (especially drug overdoses)
- In Liverpool in England, Old Dock Sill
- Orbital Dysfunctional Syndrome from the film Pandorum
- Occupy Dame Street, a protest in Dublin, Ireland in 2011–12

== See also ==
- Odds
- OD (disambiguation)
- odes (disambiguation)
