= Eulengebirgsbahn =

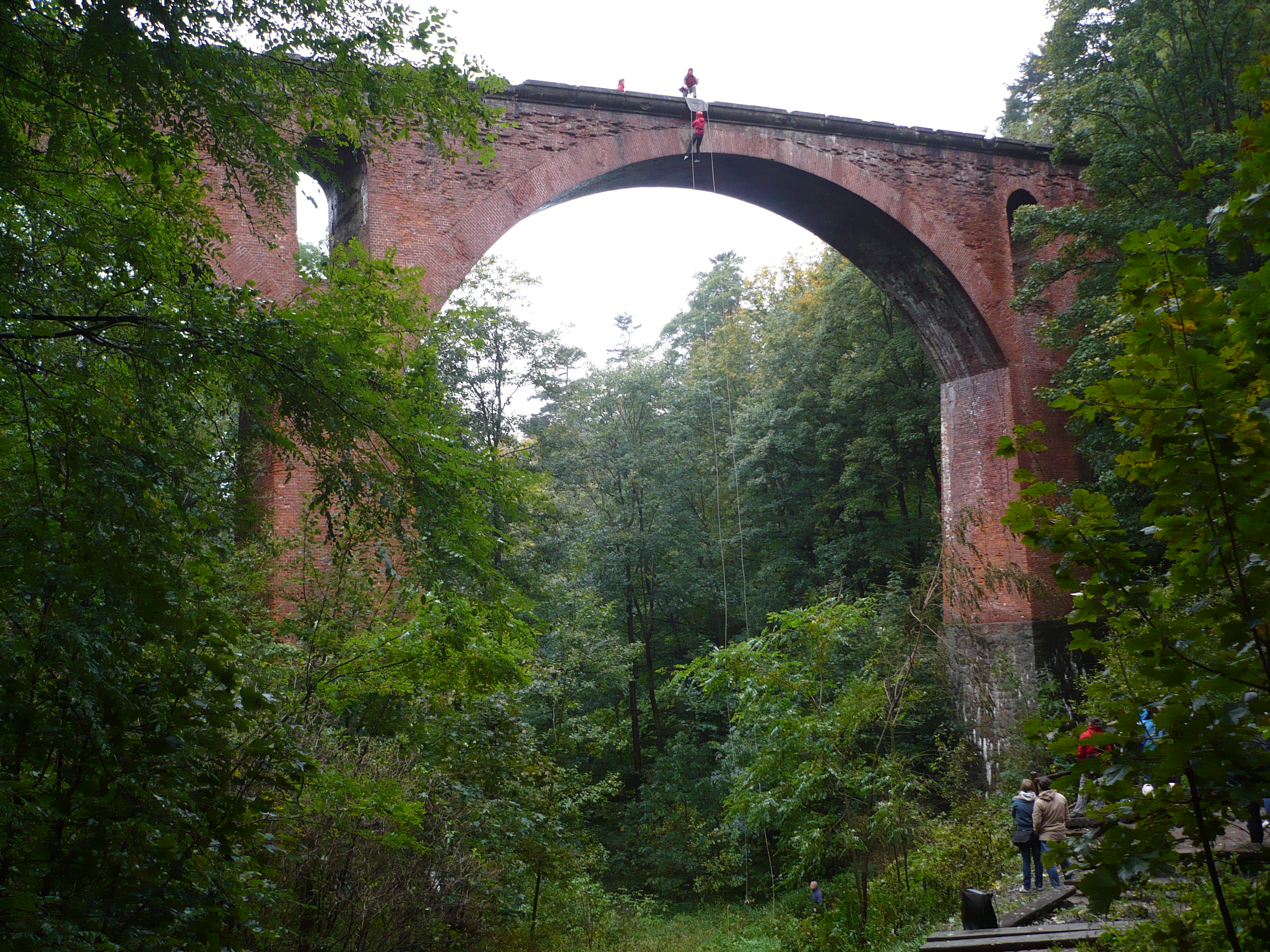
Abseiling on a bridge in the Owl Mountains (2010)

The Eulengebirgsbahn AG was a Prussian railway company.

In 1899-1903 it gradually built a railway line connecting Reichenbach (today Dzierżoniów) with Wünschelburg (Radków). Regular traffic on the line was abolished, the section from Ścinawka Średnia (Mittelsteine) to Słupiec (Schlegel) still serves as an industrial siding for the local gabbro mine.

== See also ==
- Owl Mountains
- Kleinbahn
- List of former German railway companies
