= Soltau–Neuenkirchen Light Railway =

The Soltau–Neuenkirchen Light Railway Company (German: Kleinbahn Soltau-Neuenkirchen GmbH) opened the Soltau–Neuenkirchen railway in North Germany on 15 May 1920.

An extension of the Kleinbahn (light railway) from Lüneburg to Soltau to Neuenkirchen or Rotenburg was contemplated even during its construction, and in 1913, the Kingdom of Prussia, the Province of Hanover and the district of Soltau set aside funding to enable the Soltau–Neuenkirchen Light Railway Company to be established. Construction began in 1914, but it could not be completed during the First World War. There was a provisional service from the beginning of 1917, but it was not until 15 May 1920 that the line was officially opened.

It ran from the railway hub at Soltau as a stub line only 12 km northwestwards into the Lüneburg Heath. Passenger services had been reduced in 1927 to just one pair of trains (5.44 am from Neuenkirchen; 10.10 pm from Soltau); even this was withdrawn in 1928 and passenger trains did not run again until 1948.

The Soltau–Neuenkirchen Light Railway was one of the predecessor companies of the East Hanoverian Railways, into which it was absorbed in 1944.

== Bibliography ==
- Gerd Wolff: Deutsche Klein- und Privatbahnen. Band 10: Niedersachsen 2. Zwischen Weser und Elbe. EK-Verlag, Freiburg 2007, S. 344–349, ISBN 978-3-88255-669-8
