= Ozor =

- Gender: Male
- Language: Igbo

Origin
- Origin: Nigeria
- Meaning: A name given to a titled man
- Region of origin: South east

Ozor audiois a prestigious title acquired by the Igbos. It is a name given to someone who has acquired the title.

== Notable people ==
- Florence Ozor (born 1980), Nigerian activist and businesswoman
- Michael Ozor (born 1988), Nigerian footballer

== See also ==
- Odor (surname)
