= Gittelde–Grund railway =

Former railway line in Germany

Technical
- Line length: 4.21 km
- Track gauge: 1,435 mm
- Minimum radius: 180 m
- Maximum incline: 3.3 %

The Gittelde–Grund railway, also known as Kleinbahn Gittelde-Grund, was a railway line connecting the mining town of Grund at the western edge of the Harz mountains with the station of Gittelde on the Herzberg–Seesen railway. It opened in 1910 and closed in 1971.

== History ==
Grund was one of the seven major mining towns in the Harz. To provide a transport link for its ore mines, a standard-gauge tertiary railway line was built and operated by the Kleinbahn Gittelde-Grund GmbH, a company to which the state of Prussia, the Province of Hanover, the Prussian district of Zellerfeld and the municipality of Grund had contributed funds. It connected to the Herzberg–Seesen railway in Gittelde. The station there, as well as 3.3 km (2.1 mi) of the new line, were on the territory of the Duchy of Brunswick. The length of the line was 4.2 km (2.6 mi). It had intermediate halts in Windhausen and Laubhütte, and a separate goods station in Bad Grund, west of the terminus. The main freight on the line was iron ore from Hilfe Gottes mine which was handled from facilities northwest of the passenger station. The mine entrance could be reached via a turntable.

The line was first managed by the Cassel regional administrative office of the Prussian state railways, from 1924 by the Lower Saxon State Railway Office in Hannover and from 1 October 1959 until closure by Osthannoversche Eisenbahnen (OHE).

A branch line between Gittelde and Grund was already envisaged in 1867/1868 when the Seesen-Osterode line was planned. In 1896 first surveys were made, and in 1900 an electric railway was proposed. The Kleinbahn Gittelde-Grund GmbH was formed in 1908. The maximum gradient of the new line was 1 in 30, the minimum curve radius 180&m.

Freight traffic started on 15 April 1910, passenger traffic on 1 May 1910. The latter was never very brisk, despite Grund being a health resort and having been awarded the title Bad in 1916. A reason for this was the unfavourable placement of the passenger station south of the town. Starting on 19 May 1930, the railway company operated motor buses between Bad Grund and Gittelde and even the next junction station in Seesen. While there had been five passenger trains per day and direction in the first years of the operation of the railway, this number fell to one after 1930, and on 22 May 1966 passenger traffic was taken over completely by buses. When the ore transports were taken over by lorries, the line was closed down on 30 December 1971. The railway company operated in the last years as Eisenbahn Gittelde-Bad Grund GmbH. It was dissolved on 30 September 1974.

The line was dismantled in 1972. The locomotive shed in Bad Grund remained in place until 1984 when it was dismantled by railway hobbyists, and rebuilt in Almstedt-Segeste. The roofing ceremony was held in 1987, and since 1989 it is home to the rolling stock of the museum railway Almetalbahn which uses the Bodenburg–Segeste section of the Elze–Bodenburg railway line.

The former railway route is now a bicycle path.

== Rolling stock ==
Originally, the railway acquired an 0-6-0 saturated steam locomotive from Hanomag and a second-hand locomotive from Maschinenfabrik Esslingen, likewise a 0-6-0 saturated steam engine, as reserve. The latter was sold for scrap in 1933. A third locomotive of a similar type, built by Borsig, was bought second-hand in 1925 and sold in 1930. The remaining steam locomotive was replaced in 1955 by a brand new MaK diesel locomotive of type 400 C which after closure of the line was sold to Norddeutsche Eisenbahngesellschaft Niebüll (NEG) for use on the Niebüll–Dagebüll railway. In 1994 it was transferred to the museum railway in Tønder, Denmark. The railway had initially three two-axled passenger cars, a mixed car for passengers, luggage, and mail, and three freight cars.
