= ODE =

ODE may refer to:

- Ohio Department of Education, the state education agency of Ohio
- Omicron Delta Epsilon, an international honor society in the field of economics
- Online disinhibition effect, a loosening of social inhibitions during interactions with others on the Internet that would otherwise be present in normal face-to-face interaction
- Open Development Environment, a software development, build and source control environment from Open Software Foundation
- Open Dynamics Engine, a real-time physics engine
- Ordinary differential equation, a mathematical concept
- Oregon Daily Emerald, student newspaper of the University of Oregon
- Oxford Dictionary of English, a 1998 English language dictionary
- Apache ODE, a web-services orchestration engine from the Apache Software Foundation

== See also ==
- Ode (disambiguation)
- Odes (disambiguation)
