= Lüneburg–Soltau Light Railway =

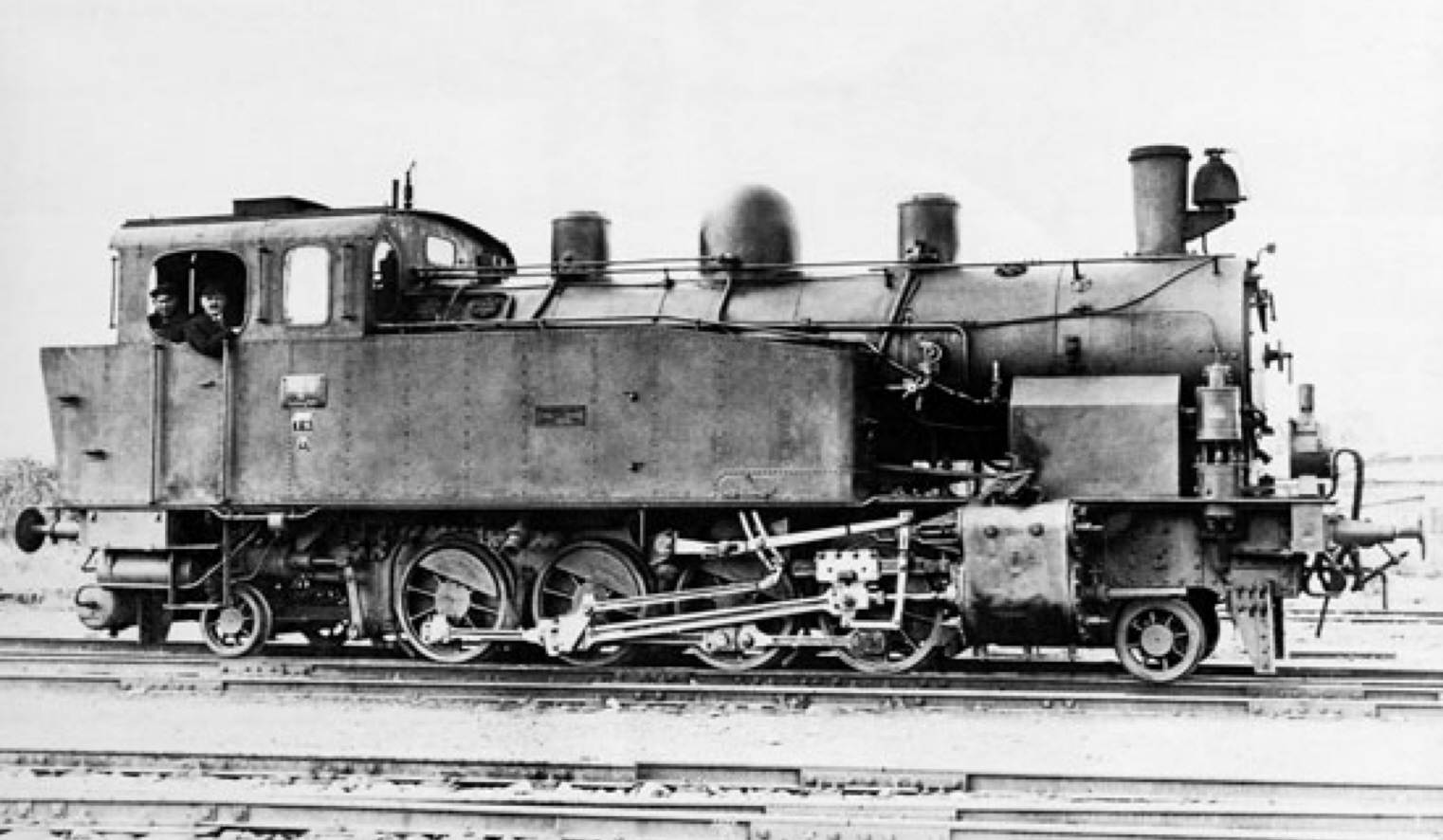
The Kleinbahn from Lüneburg-Soltau

The Lüneburg–Soltau Light Railway Company (German: Kleinbahn Lüneburg–Soltau GmbH) was founded on 15 February 1911 by the Prussian state, the Province of Hanover and the districts of Lüneburg and Soltau in North Germany. It opened its only line, a Kleinbahn from Lüneburg to Soltau, on 13 June 1913. This 57 km long, standard gauge 'hill railway' (Gebirgsbahn) ran from Lüneburg through the middle of the Lüneburg Heath via Amelinghausen-Sottorf and Hützel. Here it was joined by the Kleinbahn Winsen–Evendorf–Hützel (Luhebahn). Finally, it reached the railway hub of Soltau.

In 1920 the railway company also took over running powers for the Soltau–Neuenkirchen railway, for which it also provided rolling stock and staff.

Operation of both railways from 1 June 1923 to July 1944 became the responsibility of the State Light Railway Office in the Province of Hanover (Landeskleinbahnamtes der Provinz Hannover).

The Kleinbahn company merged with the Soltau–Neuenkirchen Light Railway Company (Kleinbahn Soltau-Neuenkirchen GmbH) on 1 January 1944 to become the Lüneburg–Soltau Railway Company (Lüneburg−Soltauer Eisenbahn GmbH), but not long afterwards, on 11 July 1944 it was transferred into the East Hanoverian Railways.

== Sources ==
- Gerd Wolff: Deutsche Klein- und Privatbahnen. Band 10: Niedersachsen 2. Zwischen Weser und Elbe. EK-Verlag, Freiburg 2007, S. 322–343, ISBN 978-3-88255-669-8
