= Oder Valley Railway =

Scharzfeld–St. Andreasberg
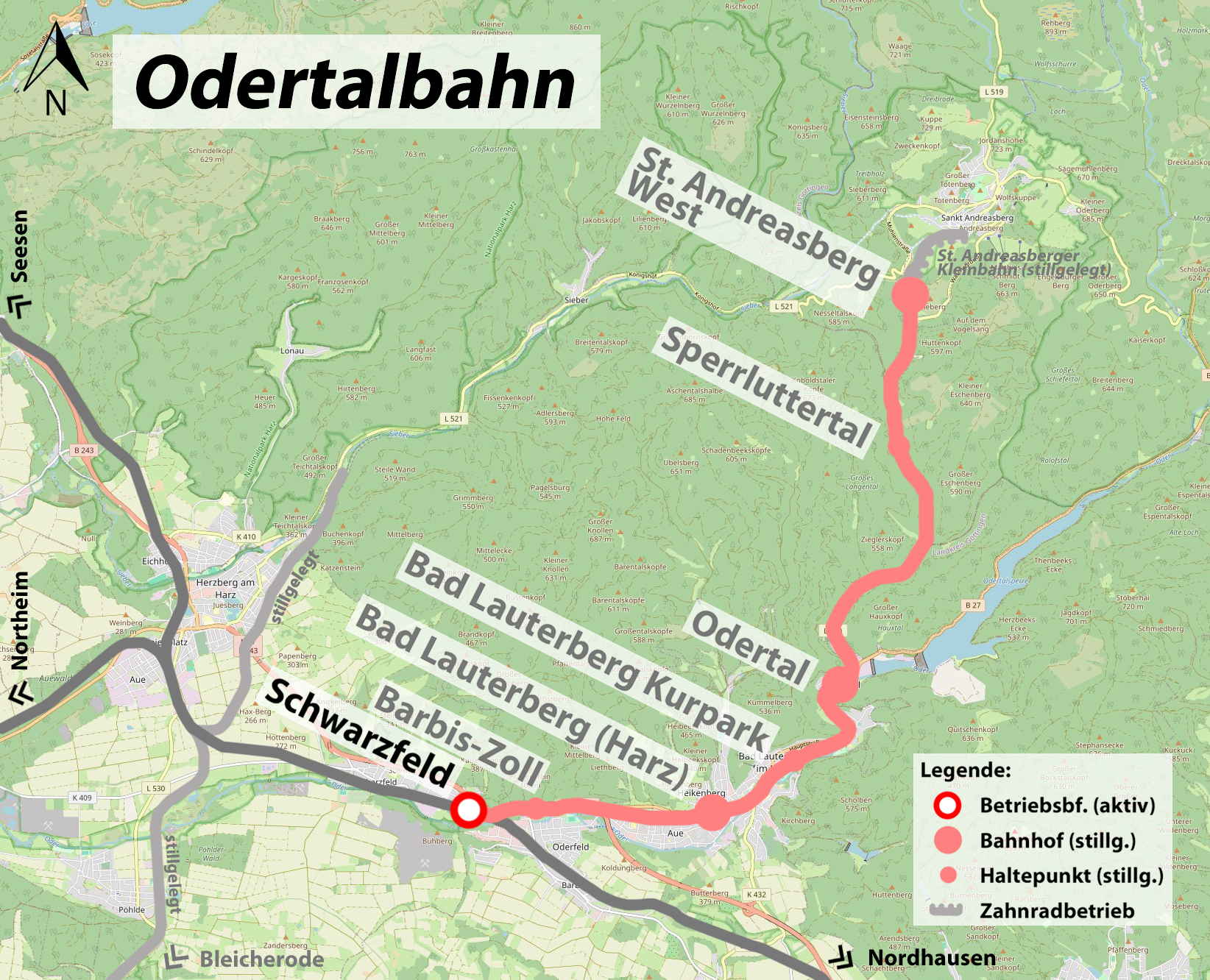

Overview
- Line number: 1815

Service
- Route number: 357

Technical
- Line length: 15.3 km
- Track gauge: 1,435 mm

The Oder Valley Railway (German: Odertalbahn) was a railway line that ran from Scharzfeld, through Bad Lauterberg, to Sankt Andreasberg-Silberhütte. It traced the upper course of the River Oder in the West Harz mountains.

== Geography ==
The line originated at Scharzfeld station, which has not been served by passenger trains since 2005. This station is located on the standard gauge South Harz Railway between Northeim and Nordhausen. From Scharzfeld, the railway proceeded to Bad Lauterberg station and then to the more centrally located halt of Bad Lauterberg-Kurpark. It then continued to Odertal, Sperrluttertal, and St. Andreasberg (Silberhütte/West), where the St. Andreasberg rack railway extended onward to St. Andreasberg town station (German: St. Andreasberg Stadt). Between Bad Lauterberg and Bad Lauterberg Kurpark, a narrow-gauge industrial railway was constructed for the transportation of baryte, which intersected with the main line.

== History ==
The line from Scharzfeld as far as Bad Lauterberg opened on 10 July 1884, with the section to St. Andreasberg-Silberhütte following on 1 November 1884. This station was located in the valley below the town itself and to establish a better connection to the town center the St. Andreasberg rack railway opened in 1913. It ran between the terminus of the Oder Valley Railway, now named St. Andreasberg West and St. Andreasberg Stadt (town). A project proposed by Georg Fichtner, a chief mechanical engineer from Berlin, to extend the railway line to Bad Harzburg, was not realised.

A halt at Bad Lauterberg Kurpark was established in the early 1960s.

Railbuses took over most passenger services in 1951 (initially Class VT 70, then Class VT 95), although steam locomotives still hauled goods and special trains for winter sports. In 1963 ten pairs of trains ran daily on weekdays, and eight on Sundays. In addition there was a semi-fast service (Eiltriebwagen) from Bad Lauterberg to Göttingen. The rolling stock on the line consisted of Uerdingen railbuses and DMUs DB classes 628 and 624.

The rack railway closed in 1959 an from the 1970s the Oder Valley line gradually lost its passenger services, too. The closure dates for passenger services were as follows:

- 28 May 1975: Odertal–Silberhütte
- 2 June 1984: Bad Lauterberg–Odertal
- 12 December 2004: Scharzfeld–Bad Lauterberg

Goods traffic from Scharzfeld to Bad Lauterberg ended on 31 December 2001.

Passenger services on the remaining section from (Herzberg –)Scharzfeld to Bad Lauterberg ceased on 12 December 2004., after being provided in the later years by DB Class 515 battery railcars, DB Class 614 DMUs and DB Class 628.4 DMUs. With the timetable change on 11 December 2005 the station of Bad Lauterberg was replaced by a halt on the South Harz Line with the name Bad Lauterberg im Harz–Barbis. The new station, however, is situated about 4 kilometres west of the town centre. The former station of Bad Lauterberg was located only about 1 km from the centre, while Bad Lauterberg-Kurpark halt, in use until 1984, was right in the centre.

North of Bad Lauterberg the line has been dismantled following the closure of these sections. After December 2004, the southern section was only used irregularly for goods trains and specials. The last owner of the southern section between Scharzfeld–Bad Lauterberg was the private Almetalbahn. On occasion of the construction of a new road bridge for Bundesstraße 243, this last stretch of line was finally lifted in November 2007 using a road-rail excavator, because economic operation of the line was no longer considered possible.

The half-timbered station building of Bad Lauterberg now houses a restaurant. The building at Bad Lauterberg Kurpark was used by a café, but was demolished in 2015. Odertal station building is now the club house of a local fishing club, while St Andreasberg West (formerly Silberhütte) station has been demolished. Hiking is now possible on the former railway trackbed between Silberhütte and Odertal, and the section between Odertal and Bad Lauterberg Kurpark has been converted into a combined foot and cycling path. Between Bad Lauterberg Kurpark and Bad Lauterberg the line has been mostly built over.
