= Odor (surname) =

Odor or Ódor or O'Dor, is a surname.

Notable people with the surname include:

- Andrea Ódor (born 1975), Hungarian baseball player
- Ferenc Ódor (born 1954), Hungarian veterinary physician and politician
- Gabriel Odor (born 2000), Austrian speed skater
- Kieth O'dor or Odor (1962–1995), British racing driver
- Lajos Ódor (1960–2026), Hungarian rower
- Ľudovít Ódor (born 1976), Slovak economist and politician
- Rouglas Odor (born 1968), Venezuelan baseball player
- Rougned Odor (born 1994), Venezuelan Major League Baseball player
- Steven O'Dor (born 1987), Australian footballer

== See also ==
- Ozor
