= St. Andreasberg rack railway =

Former rack railway in Germany

St. Andreasberg West–St. Andreasberg Stadt
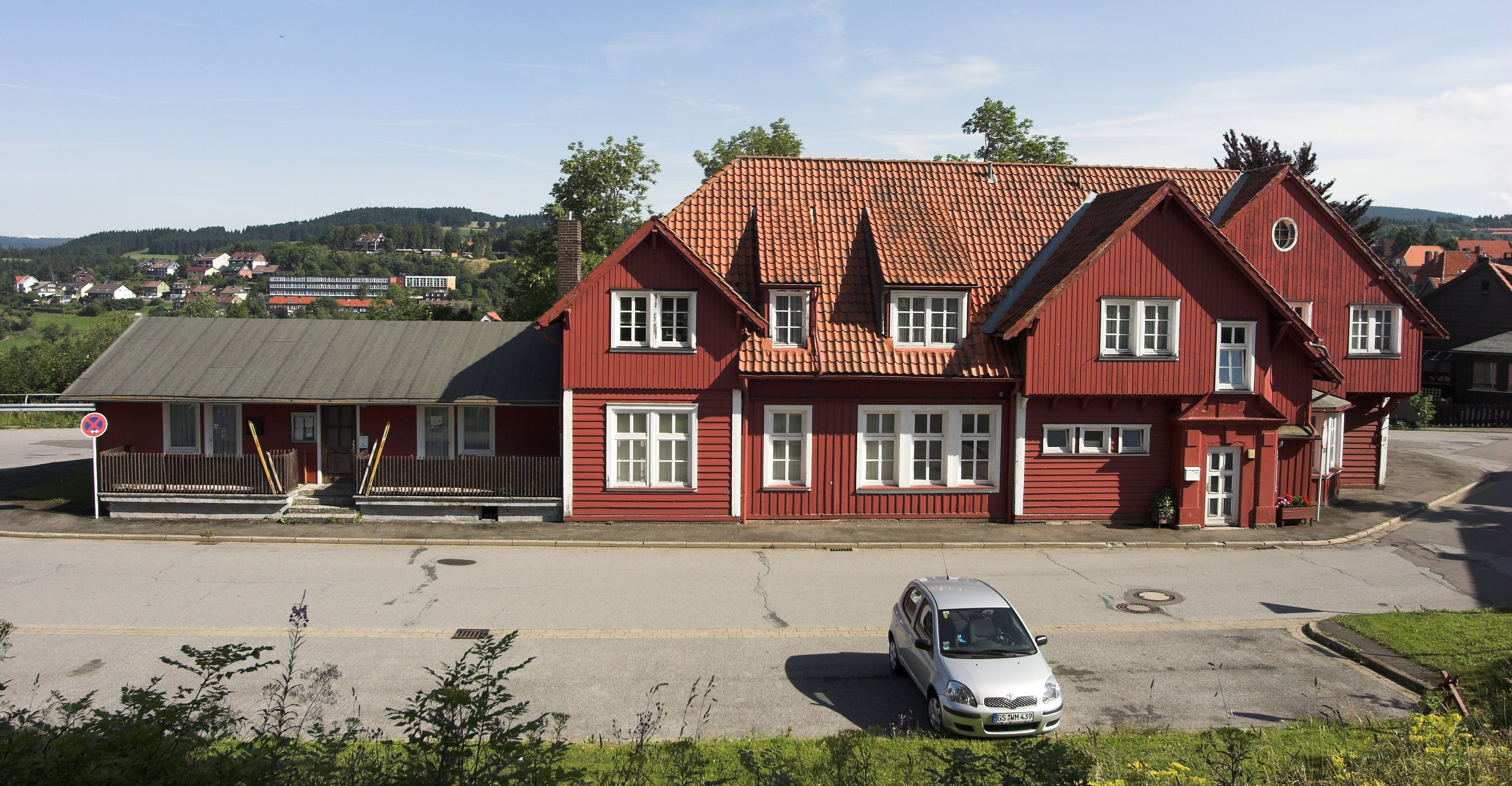
- St. Andreasberg Stadt station

History
- Opened: 19 July 1913
- Closed: 17 August 1959

Technical
- Line length: 1,636 km (1,017 mi)
- Rack system: Abt, 2 bars
- Track gauge: 1,435 mm
- Minimum radius: 275 m (902 ft)
- Operating speed: 8 km/h (5.0 mph)
- Maximum incline: 12.2%
Route map
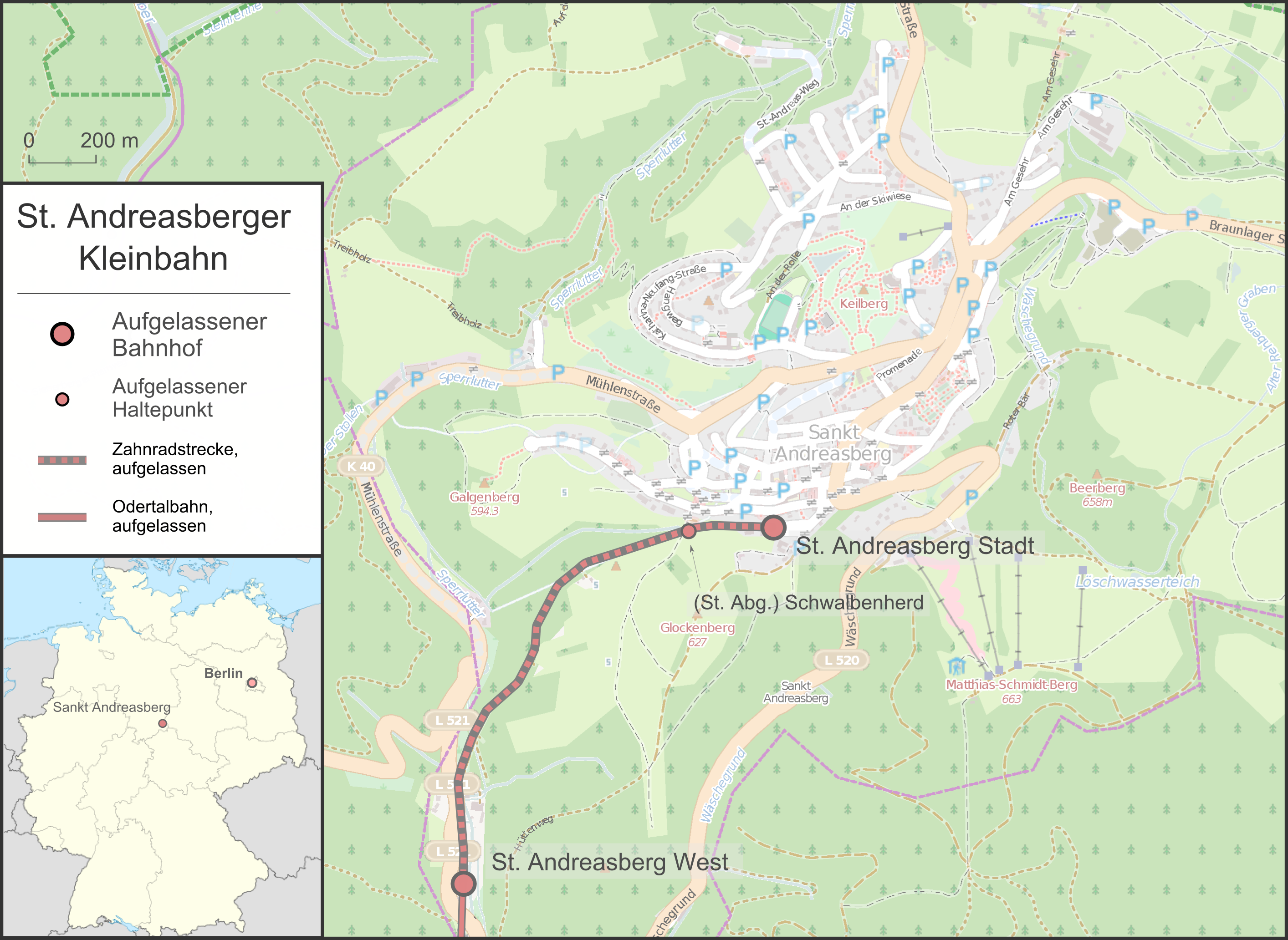

The St. Andreasberg rack railway (German: Zahnradbahn St. Andreasberg) was a standard gauge, mixed rack and adhesion railway in the Upper Harz in central Germany. The railway opened in 1913, linking the station at St. Andreasberg Stadt to St. Andreasberg West on the Oder Valley branch line, and closed in 1959.

== History ==
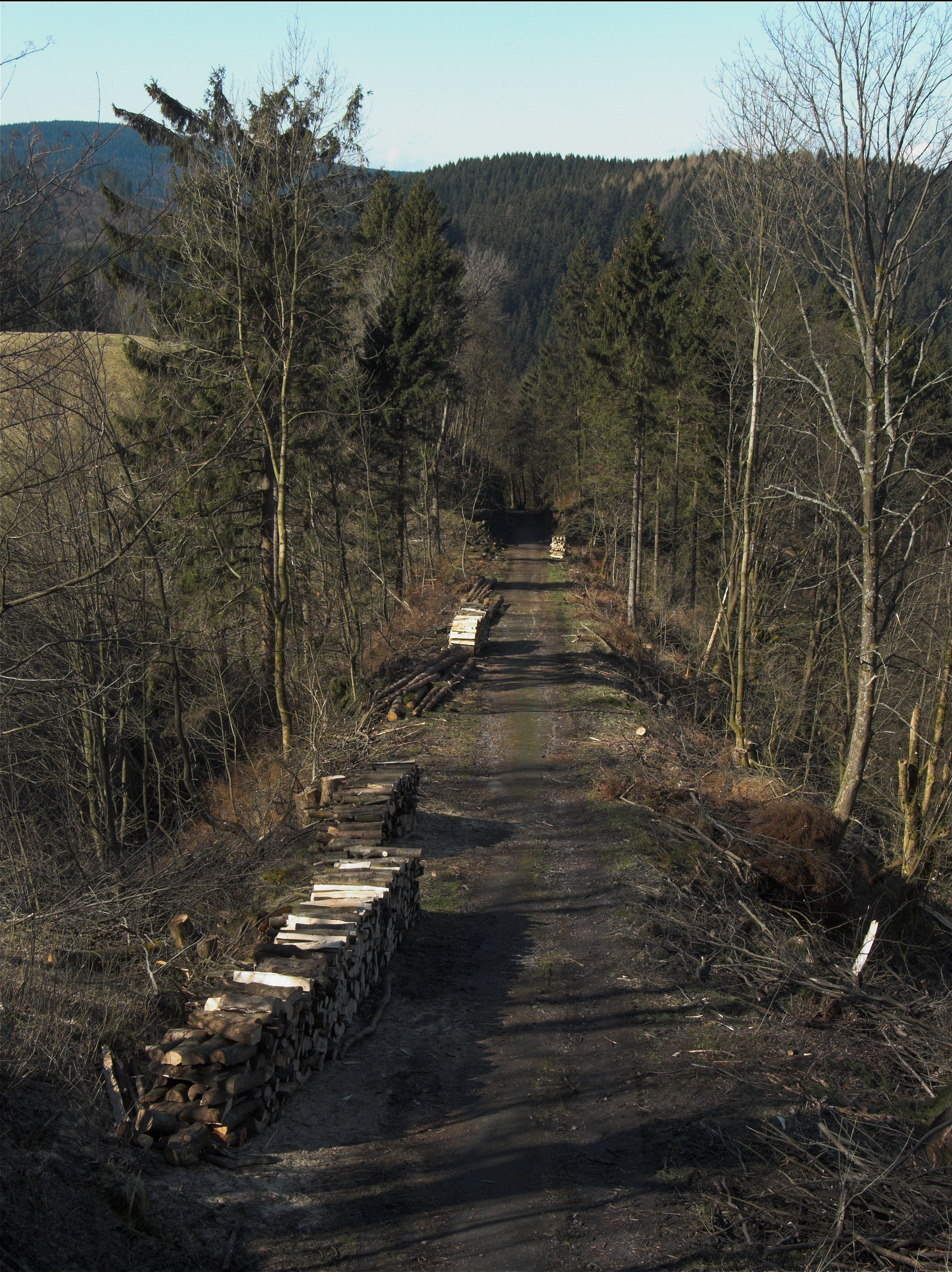
Former railway embankment of the rack railway section

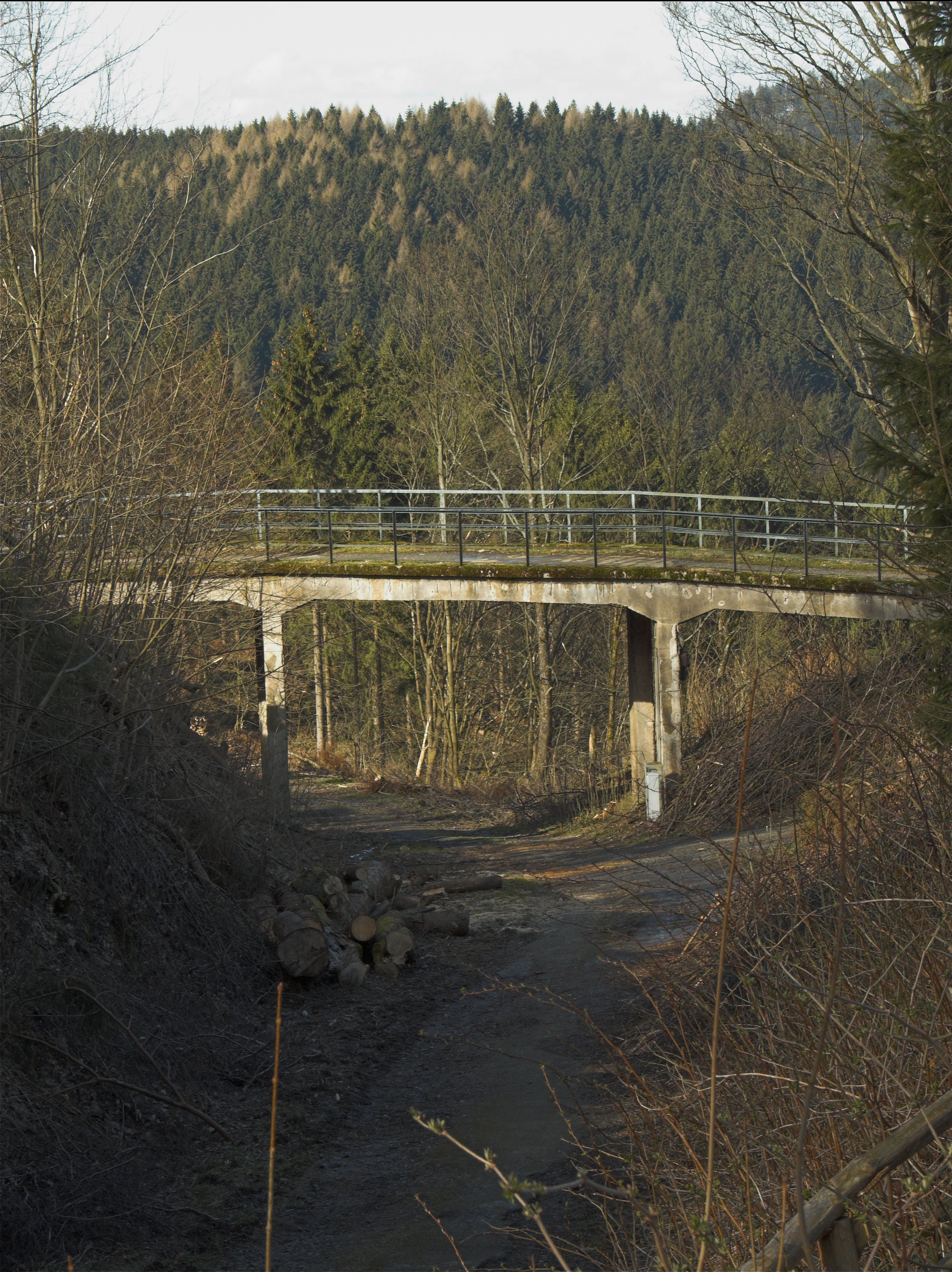
Former wayside halt at Schwalbenherd

The Oder Valley Railway opened in 1884, connecting St. Andreasberg via Bad Lauterberg to the South Harz Railway (Northeim–Nordhausen) in Scharzfeld. The terminus was the station of St. Andreasberg West, located at the foot of the Glockenberg hill. The location of the Oder Valley Railway station, 3 km from the village centre and 170 m lower in a deep valley, was rather inconvenient for the townsfolk of St. Andreasberg. As early as 23 June 1903, the local council had sent proposals to the railway administration in Kassel explaining three options for extending the railway to the town centre. Extending the adhesion-based Oder Valley Railway did not seem feasible due to the high cost as the necessary height gain would only have been possible by artificially extending the length of the line to achieve an acceptable grade for an adhesion railway. As a result, a rack railway based on the Abt system was proposed. Three different options for the route were evaluated:

- following the road through the Sperrlutter valley with a maximum gradient of 1 in 12
- following the Wäschegrund with a comparable incline
- climbing out of the Sperrlutter Valley and cutting through the Grüner Hirsch with a maximum gradient of 1 in 6

After further negotiations it was decided in 1906 to build the third option with a slightly altered loop and a maximum gradient of 1 in 8.2.

Construction started on 1 April 1911. During the winter of 1912/13, work had to be halted for several months, which meant that laying the track and the rack rail only started in April 1913. The route was 1,636.15 metres long and required 1,543.61 metres of double-bar, rack rail. The concession to operate the railway was granted on 5 June 1911 by the district president of Hanover and permitted the operation of a railway for the next 100 years.

The railway was officially opened on 19 July 1913, although goods operations had already started 3 days earlier so that employees could familiarise themselves with the operation. The railway was operated by the St. Andreasberger Kleinbahn company. The upper terminus station was named St. Andreasberg Stadt (St. Andreasberg Town) and the line also had a halt at Schwalbenherd.

== Operation ==
Initially, five pairs of trains were timetabled daily, each with a journey time of about 15 minutes (at a top speed of 8 km/h). In the 1920s, only two pairs of trains ran daily due to the effects of the First World War, a lack of coal and declining goods and passenger traffic. From 1932, even busses and lorries were used. Operation of the railway was taken over by the Hanover State Light Railway Office in 1924.

The railway company was renamed to the St. Andreasberger Eisenbahn GmbH in 1950, but the Deutsche Bundesbahn's intentions to close the line from Bad Lauterberg to St. Andreasberg West caused further problems for its operations. Protests and rationalisation kept the Oder Valley Railway open and in 1953 plans were made to modernise the rack railway. But neither the acquisition of a modern diesel rack railway locomotive, which could run through from Scharzfeld to St. Andreasberg, nor the electrification of the line could be carried out due to cost.

The last attempt to save the line was the use of DB Class VT 98 railbuses. Dr. Paul Schöning, head of the Braunschweig mechanical engineering department (Maschinenamtes Braunschweig), drove a railbus without any authority or permission, on the inclined part of the route on 18 September 1957 and determined that the railbus could manage the gradient running uphill but would have had to be fitted with additional brakes for the downhill run, but they were never employed in service.

== Closure ==
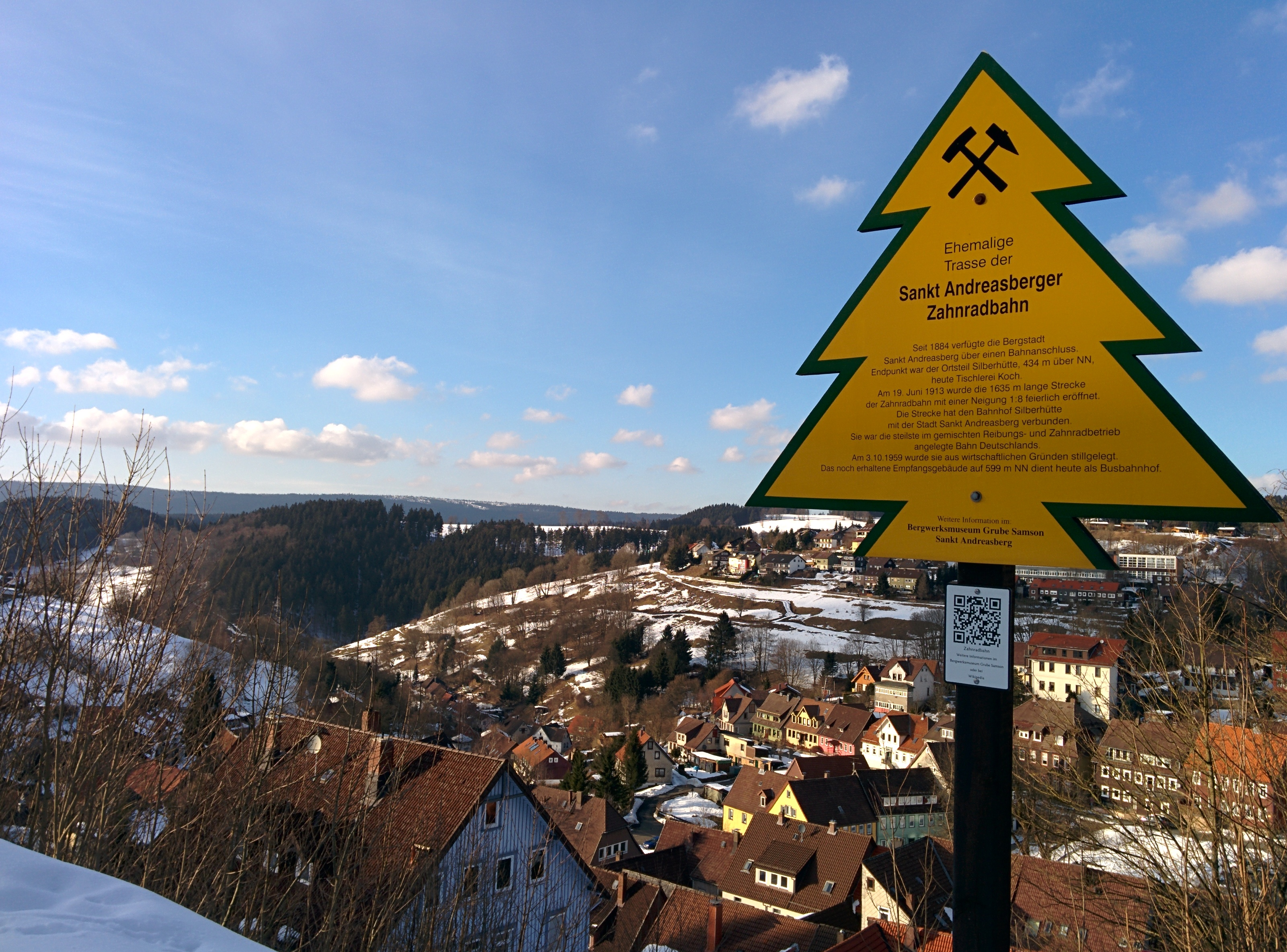
Dennert Fir Tree in memory of the railway

In 1955, the Lower Saxony Ministry for the Economy and Transport warmed that operations on the St. Andreasberg rack railway were very unprofitable. Declining goods traffic, passenger traffic mainly using buses and the poor condition of the permanent way made the end of the rack railway ever more likely. A serious accident on the Drachenfels Railway in September 1958, which killed 18 and injured 100 people, was cited, at a business meeting on 28 November 1958, in announcing the closure of the line in St. Andreasberg. Rail services ceased on 1 January 1959 after 46 years of operations, although a final passenger train worked the line on 23 April 1959. The railway was officially closed on 17 August 1959 and work began immediately on lifting the track. The railway company operated a bus service until 30 May 1965 when this was taken over by the Deutsche Bundesbahn.

The surviving station building was used as a resort administrative office and then, until 2005, an artist's studio. The large roof canopy is still bus station today and the old engine shed is used by a local bus company as a garage. The old trackbed has been partially tarmacked.

== Rolling stock ==
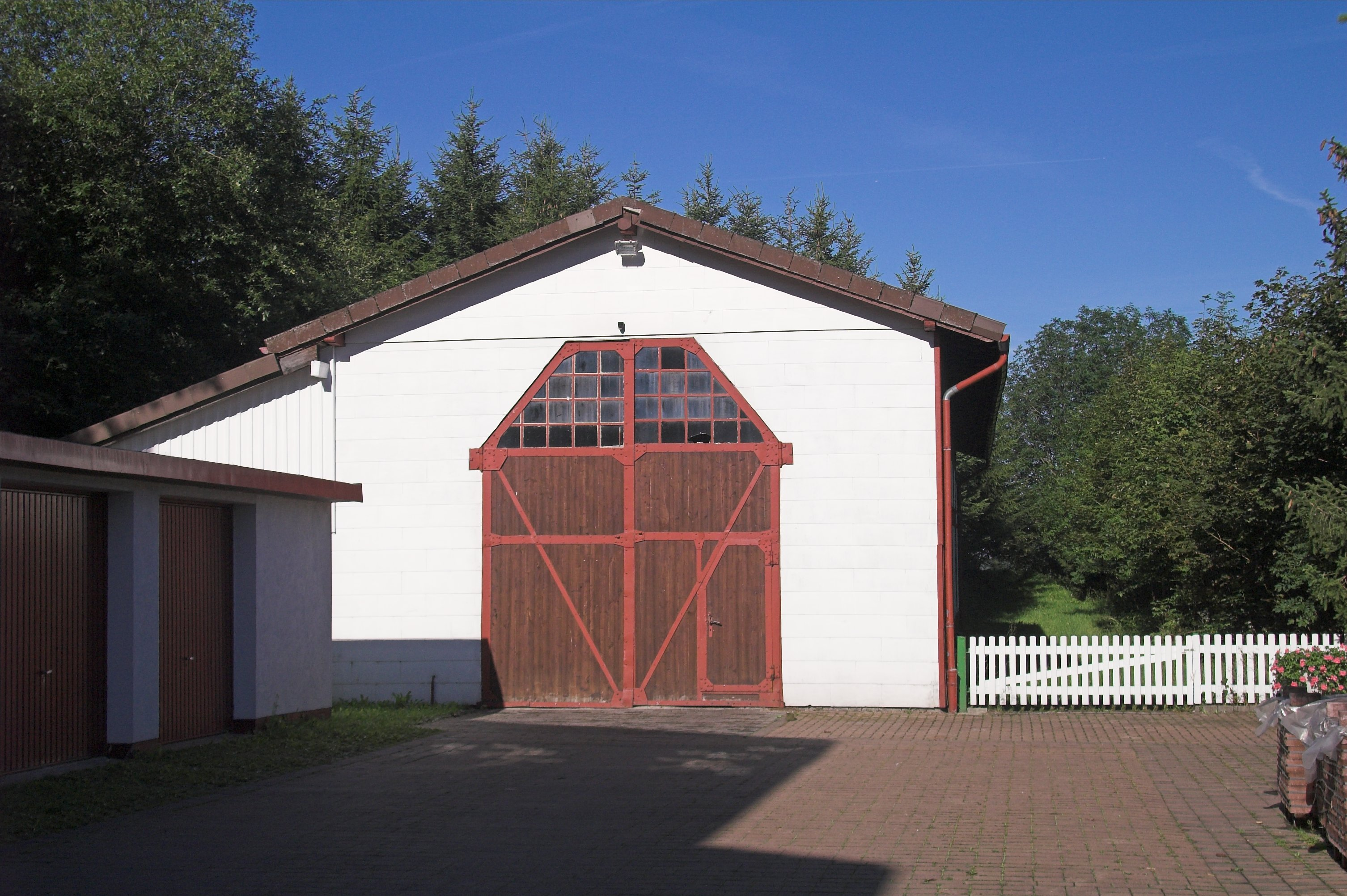
Former engine shed

The railway had two 0-6-0T, rack, steam engines:

Number	NLEA number	Manufacturer	Works number	Year	Type	Power	Weight
1	391	Jung	1780	1912	C-n4vzt	320 PS	37 t
2	392	Jung	1781	1912	C-n4vzt	320 PS	37 t

The railway had two four-wheel passenger carriages manufactured in 1913 by the Hannoversche Waggonfabrik. Both were 14.0 m (45.9 ft) long with an 8.0 m (26.2 ft) wheelbase and a braking cog on the downhill axle. Carriage No. 1 had a post and luggage section at one end and seats for 39 passengers. Carriage No. 2 had seats for 70 passengers and open balconies at each end. The railway also owned a single four-wheel open wagon used for transport of goods and, in winter, skis.

All the rolling stock was scrapped after the railway closed.

== Sources ==
- Gerd Wolff (2009), Deutsche Klein- und Privatbahnen (in German), vol. 11. Niedersachsen – 3. Südlich des Mittellandkanals, Freiburg im Breisgau: EK-Verlag, ISBN 978-3-88255-670-4
