= Odes =

Odes may refer to:

- The plural of ode, a type of poem
- Odes (Horace), a collection of poems by the Roman author Horace, circa 23 BCE
- Odes of Solomon, a pseudepigraphic book of the Bible
- Book of Odes (Bible), a Deuterocanonical book of the Bible
- Odes (Irene Papas album)
- Odes (The Flowers of Hell album)
- Odes, Victor Hugo's second poetry book
- Classic of Poetry, a book from ancient China that has been translated as Odes
- ODEs may be an abbreviation for ordinary differential equations
- Odic force
- "-odes", a suffix used in taxonomy

== See also ==
- OD (disambiguation)
- ODS (disambiguation)
- ODE (disambiguation)
- Ode (disambiguation)
