= Florence Ozor =

Nigerian activist

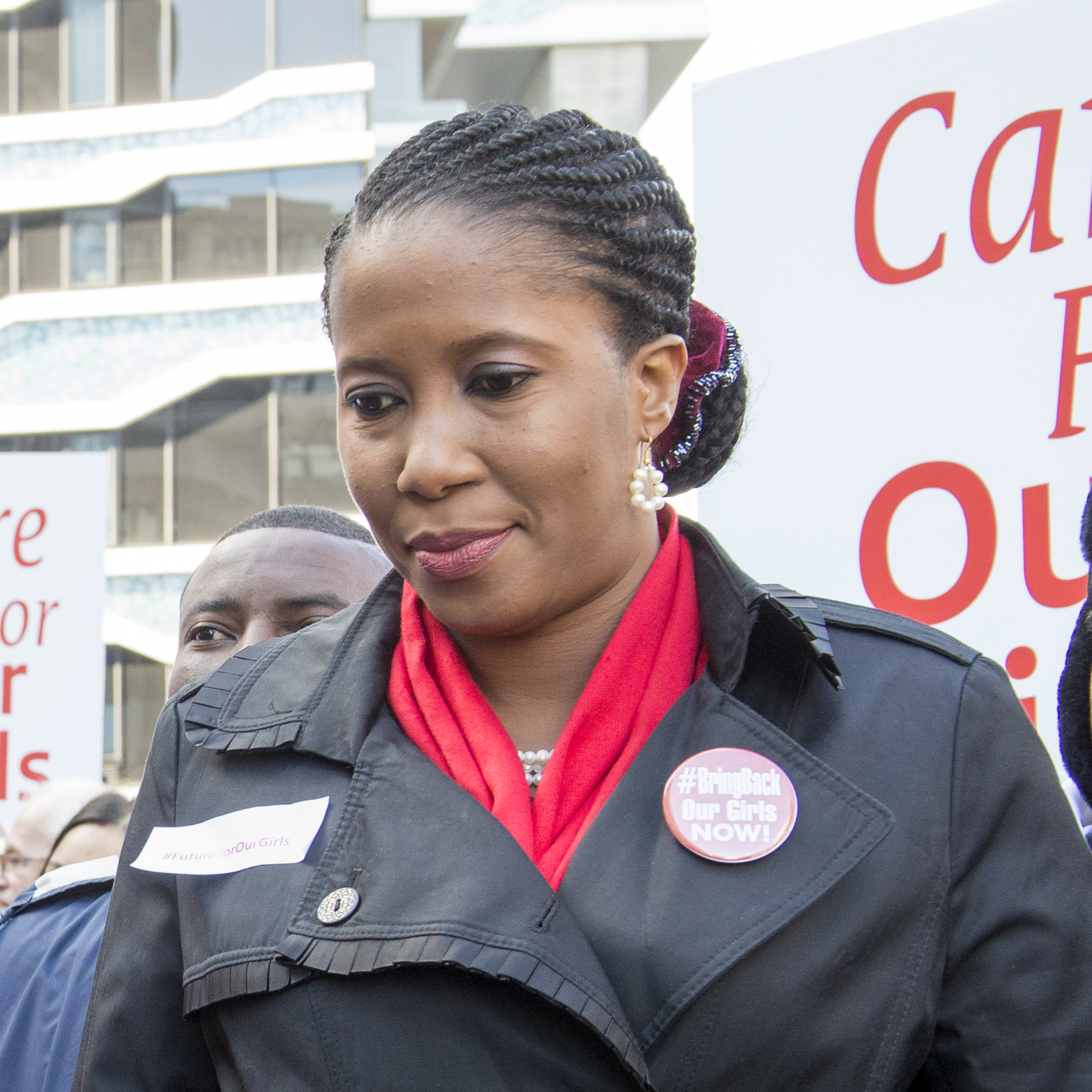
- Born: 1980 (age 45–46); Lagos, Nigeria
- Education: Harvard University
- Occupations: Women's right advocate, oil and gas professional, and lawyer

Florence Ozor (born 1980) is a Nigerian women's rights activist and businesswoman, and one of the pioneers of the Bring Back Our Girls movement. She has been called a "resolute feminist".

== Early life ==
Florence Ozor was born in 1980, in Lagos, Nigeria, the middle child in a family of five girls. She studied history and international relations, as well as courses on leadership in Lagos, Harvard and Singapore.

== Career ==
Ozor has worked in the fields of fashion, manufacturing, advertising and public relations, and settled into corporate communications and government relations in about 2010.

In 2014, Ozor spent several weeks in Washington, D.C., as one of 23 women on a U.S. State Department Global Women's Mentoring program. As part of this she went on a state-wide speaking tour of the US state of Colorado, and highlighted the plight of the missing girls, saying that the world was in danger of forgetting about them.

In 2014, Ozor attended the 2014 Women's Leadership Retreat at the Entusi Resort and Retreat Center in Uganda, where she got all the attendees to pose for a photograph behind a Bring Back Our Girls banner, and spoke to Newsweek about it.

Ozor is one of the two signatories to a Bring Back Our Girls press release of October 2017, Mr President, time to act is now, along with Oby Ezekwesili, stating that it was day 1,277 and that 113 of the girls remained in captivity.

She has established the Florence Ozor Foundation, a non-governmental, not-for-profit advocacy organisation focused on leadership and the empowerment of women and girls in Nigeria.

Ozor was a speaker at the "Political Empowerment of Women in Africa and Europe" conference in Brussels in September 2017, organised by the Global Progressive Forum and PES Women as part of the 2017 Africa Week.
