= Emden-Pewsum-Greetsiel Light Railway =

Emden–Pewsum–Greetsiel

Service
- Route number: ex 223c

Technical
- Line length: 22.8 km
- Track gauge: 1,000 mm

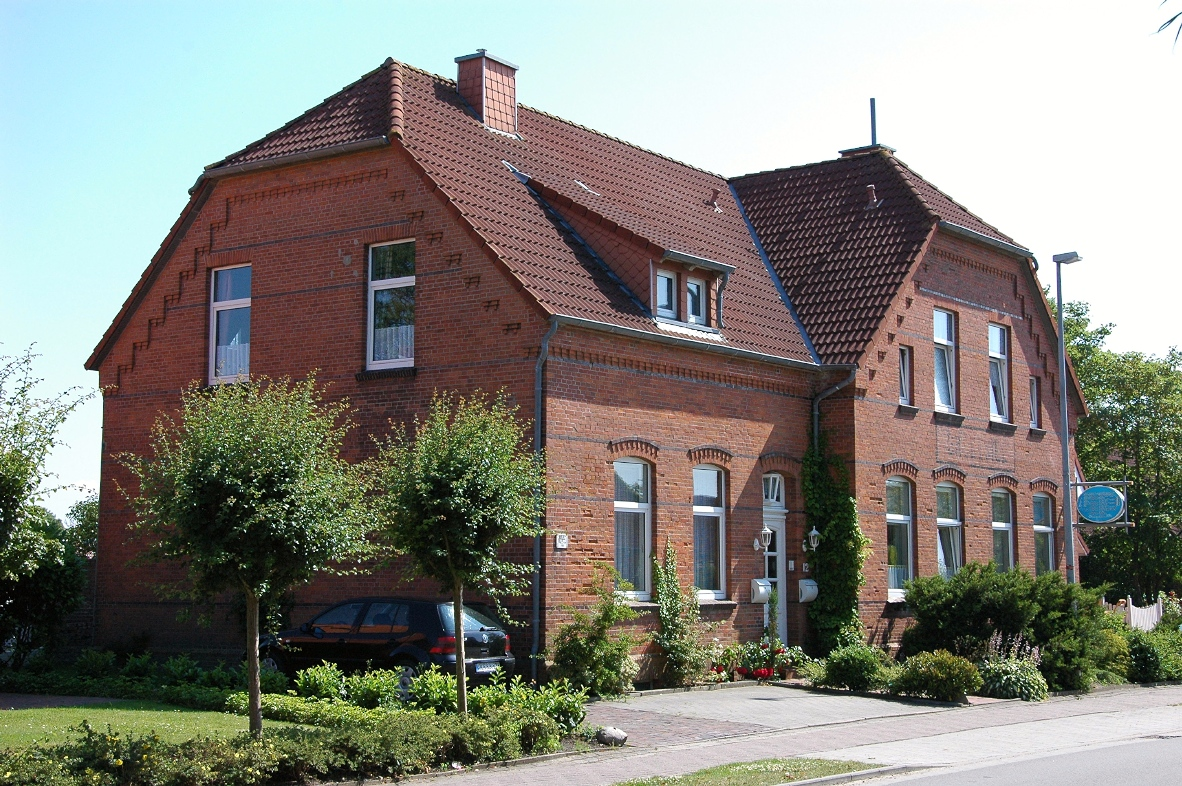
Former station building of the closed Greetsiel station in 2009

The Emden-Pewsum-Greetsiel light railway (German: Kreisbahn Emden-Pewsum-Greetsiel) was originally a private railway operated by the district of Emden in East Frisia in North Germany. In 1932 the district was absorbed into the district of Norden.

The metre-gauge light railway line was 23 kilometres (14 mi) long and began in Emden district station near the state railway station of Emden-West, which had been expanded in 1935/36 from the minor station of Larrelter Straße. It ran through the Krummhörn landscape via Hinte and Pewsum to the port of Greetsiel on the bay of Leybucht. Within its catchment area the railway was also known as "Jan Klein". (From the official name of Emden station the railway postal stamp used on the light railway was "Emden−Larrelt−Greetsiel", which appeared to refer to the non-existent station of Larrelt, but was just a short way of writing "Emden-Larrelter Straße − Greetsiel".)

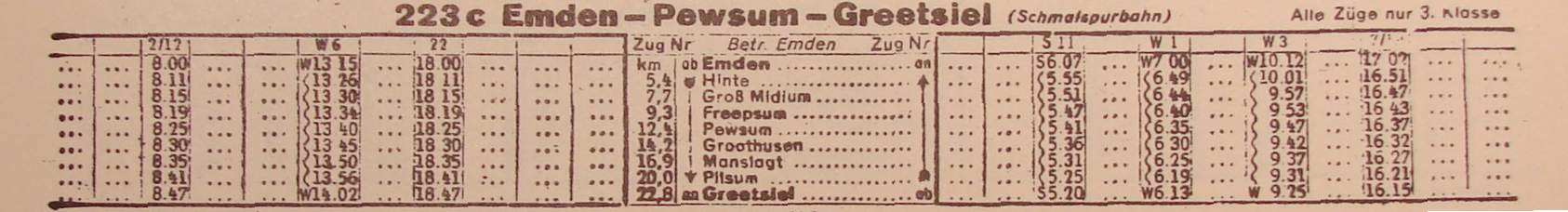
1944 timetable

Passenger and goods services began on 27 July 1899 from Emden to Pewsum and were extended as far as Greetsiel from 21 September 1906. From 1933, operations were run by the Hanover State Light Railway Office, later the Lower Saxon State Railway Office at Hanover (NLEA). After its dissolution, the line was taken over on 1 October 1959 by the Bentheimer Eisenbahn.

On 25 May 1963 the line was closed to all traffic and the track lifted. The Kraftpost took over passenger services using buses.

== Sources ==
- Hinrich Rudolfsen: Die Kreisbahn Emden-Pewsum-Greetsiel und die Straßenbahn Emden - Außenhafen. Verlag Kenning, Nordhorn 2005. (Nebenbahndokumentationen 19). ISBN 3-933613-77-9
