= Operating deflection shape =

Operating deflection shape (ODS), is a term often used in the structural vibration analysis, known as ODS analysis. ODS analysis is a method used for visualisation of the vibration pattern of a machine or structure as influenced by its own operating forces. This is as opposed to the study of the vibration pattern of a machine under an (known) external force analysis, which is called modal analysis.
