= Lower Saxon State Railway Office =

The Lower Saxon State Railway Office (NLEA; German: Niedersächsische Landeseisenbahnamt) was a central authority that managed the operation of many light railways (known as Kleinbahnen) in the North German state of Lower Saxony. These were predominantly those railways which the state had a financial stake in.

== History ==
As in most Prussian provinces, a large number of Kleinbahn railway lines appeared in the Province of Hanover following the passing of the Prussian Kleinbahn law.

== Railways managed by the NLEA ==
- Ankum-Bersenbrücker Eisenbahn
- Bleckeder Kreisbahn
- Bremervörde-Osterholzer Eisenbahn GmbH
- Kleinbahn Buxtehude-Harsefeld GmbH
- Delmenhorst-Harpstedter Eisenbahn
- Gartetalbahn Göttingen Duderstadt
- Kleinbahn Farge-Wulsdorf GmbH
- Gittelde–Grund railway
- Kleinbahn Hoya-Syke-Asendorf GmbH
- Kleinbahn Lüchow-Schmarsau GmbH
- Kleinbahn Lüneburg-Soltau GmbH
- Kleinbahn Neuhaus-Brahlstorf GmbH
- Kleinbahn Soltau-Neuenkirchen GmbH
- Kleinbahn Winsen-Evendorf-Hützel GmbH
- Kleinbahn Winsen-Niedermarschacht GmbH
- Kreisbahn Emden-Pewsum-Greetsiel
- Kreisbahn Leer-Aurich-Wittmund
- St. Andreasberger Kleinbahn GmbH
- Steinhuder Meer-Bahn GmbH
- Verden-Walsroder Eisenbahn
- Wilstedt-Zeven-Tostedter Eisenbahn

== Sources ==
- Rogl, Hans Wolfgang (1996). Archiv deutscher Klein- und Privatbahnen - Niedersachsen (in German). Stuttgart: Transpress. ISBN 3-344-71022-2.
- Wolff, Gerd (2007). Deutsche Klein- und Privatbahnen. Band 10: Niedersachsen 2. Zwischen Weser und Elbe (in German). Freiburg: EK-Verlag. pp. 9–11. ISBN 978-3-88255-669-8.
