= OD =

OD or Od may refer to:

== Education ==
- Old Diocesan, a former pupil of Diocesan College
- Old Dunelmian, a former pupil of Durham School

== Medicine ==
- OD or o.d., an abbreviation used in medical prescriptions for omne in die or "once daily" both meaning "take once every day"
- Doctor of Optometry (O.D.)
- Oculus dexter, ocular dexter, or ocularis dexter, meaning "right eye" in general ophthalmologic or optometric usage, particularly in eyeglass prescriptions
- Osteochondritis dissecans, a medical disease affecting the joints of both humans and animals
- Overdose, the inadvertent drug effects of the user rendered unresponsive or fatally succumbed due to unsophistication of self-medicating being unaccustomed to quantities greater than recommended

== Music ==
- Oblivion Dust, a Japanese rock band
- Old Dominion (band), an American country music band
- One Direction, a British/Irish pop music band
- Orphei Drängar, a Swedish male choir
- The OD EP, a 2012 extended play by Danny Brown
- Overly Dedicated, a 2010 mixtape by Kendrick Lamar
- "O.D", a song by Sunna from the album One Minute Science (2000)
- "OD", an alternative name for the song "Diamond Boy (DTM)" by SZA from Lana (2024)
- "OD", a song by Earl Sweatshirt from the EP Feet of Clay (2019)

== Organizations ==
- Batik Air Malaysia (IATA airline code OD)
- Ordnungsdienst, Jewish order service in ghettos during the war
- Organization development

== People and characters ==
- Super OD, a Ghanaian actor
- O.D (Gatchaman Crowds), a character in the anime series Gatchaman Crowds
- Ód or Óðr, a Nordic god

== Places ==
- Odisha, India
- Stormarn (district), Germany (vehicle plate code OD)

== Science and technology ==
- Optical density
- Outside diameter (also: O.D.), cylinder or pipe external diameter
- Ordnance datum, in Britain, an Ordnance Survey data point
- od (Unix), a Unix program
- Object Desktop, a suite of skinning and customization programs by Stardock, or ObjectDock, another program by the same company
- Optical disc
- Organization development, the study of organizational change and performance
- Ordinal definable set, a set requiring only finitely-many ordinals to define under first-order logic.

== Other uses ==
- OD (video game), an upcoming video game developed by Kojima Productions and published by Xbox Game Studios
- Od language, an Indo-Aryan language of Pakistan
- Odic force or Od, a life force
- Occupation Double, a Quebec reality show that started in 2003
- Official Declaration, part of Latter-day Saint scripture
- Olive drab, a color, particularly of some United States Army uniforms
- Online dating
- Original dance, the second part of an ice dancing competition
- Order of Distinction, a civil honour of Jamaica

== See also ==
- ODS (disambiguation)
- Oder (disambiguation)
- Odor (disambiguation)
