= Ode (disambiguation) =

An ode is a form of stately and elaborate lyrical verse.

Ode may also refer to:

== Media, entertainment, and arts ==
=== Music ===
- Ode Records, an American record label
- Ode Records (New Zealand), a New Zealand record label

==== Albums ====
- Ode (Brad Mehldau album)
- Ode (London Jazz Composers' Orchestra album)
- An Ode, a 2019 album by South Korean boy band Seventeen

==== Songs ====
- Ode (Stravinsky), an orchestral work by Igor Stravinsky (1943) and a ballet to its music by Lorca Massine (1972)
- "Ode", a song by Soul Asylum from their 1988 album Hang Time
- "Ode", a song by Creed from their 1997 album My Own Prison
- "Ode", a song by Mono from their 2004 album Walking Cloud and Deep Red Sky, Flag Fluttered and the Sun Shined

=== Films ===
- The Ode, a 2008 film by Nilanjan Neil Lahiri (sometimes just Ode)
- Ode, a 2017 film from Nathaniel Dorsky's Arboretum Cycle

=== Other media ===
- Ode (Nabokov), a ballet by Nicolas Nabokov and Léonide Massine (Ballets Russes, 1928)
- "Ode" (poem), a poem by Arthur O'Shaughnessy
- Ode (video game), a 2017 video game by Ubisoft Reflections

== Acronyms ==
- Ohio Department of Education, the state education agency of Ohio
- Omicron Delta Epsilon, an international honor society in the field of economics
- Online disinhibition effect, a loosening of social inhibitions during interactions with others on the Internet that would otherwise be present in normal face-to-face interaction
- Open Development Environment, a software development, build and source control environment from Open Software Foundation
- Open Dynamics Engine, a real-time physics engine
- Ordinary differential equation, a mathematical concept
- Oregon Daily Emerald, student newspaper of the University of Oregon
- Oxford Dictionary of English, a 1998 English language dictionary
- Apache ODE, a web-services orchestration engine from the Apache Software Foundation

== Other ==
- Odic force or odes, a hypothetical vital energy or life force
- Ode, Gujarat, a city in Gujarat, India
- Ode to Aphrodite, an ode to the goddess Aphrodite
- Ode, one of the Biblical canticles or songs in Eastern Orthodox canon

== See also ==
- ODE (disambiguation)
- Odes (disambiguation)
