= Kleinbahn =

The term Kleinbahn (literally 'small railway', plural: Kleinbahnen) was a light railway concept used especially in Prussia for a railway line that "on account of its low importance for general railway transport" had less strict requirements placed on its construction and operation that main lines (Hauptbahnen, Vollbahnen) or secondary lines (Nebenbahnen i.e. normal branch lines). Even public railway lines built for constructional or industrial purposes were counted as Kleinbahnen.

== Origin and use ==
The concept was defined in the Prussian Kleinbahn law of 28 July 1892, that was designed to encourage the construction of local railway lines by private companies. The word Kleinbahn was chosen by a majority of MPs in the Prussian parliament instead of a range of other options - Lokalbahn (local line), Bahn unterster Ordnung (line of the lowest order) or Bahn untergeordneter Bedeutung (line of secondary importance) - because it was neither a foreign word nor had negative overtones.

In several former German states such as (Mecklenburg, Oldenburg and Baden) the concept Kleinbahn was partially adopted for lines of limited length and light construction. In the other German-speaking states, the terms Lokalbahn (Baden, Bayern, Austria), Sekundärbahn (Saxony) or Vizinalbahn (Bayern) were preferred.

In everyday speech the term Kleinbahn is widely used as a synonym for narrow gauge lines or garden railways. Despite that, Kleinbahnen may be built in either 1,435 mm (4 ft 8 1/2 in) standard gauge as well as in narrow gauge.

== Construction and operation ==
The construction and operation of Kleinbahnen were carried out to less stringent requirements, e.g. tracks were laid in a gravel rather than a normal ballast bed, and usually by private companies, which nevertheless in many cases involved substantial participation by the state, the province or local communities. The Kleinbahn company with the largest railway network in the whole of the German Empire was the 'Pomeranian state railways' (Pommerschen Landesbahnen) founded in 1940.

== Today ==
Except in Berlin, the Kleinbahn law has been superseded everywhere by new national railway laws. The former Kleinbahnen are classified today as Nebenbahnen (branch lines).

== List of Kleinbahnen ==
There is a list of German Kleinbahnen in the list of former German railway companies.

== See also ==
- Deutscher Eisenbahn-Verein which runs a preserved Kleinbahn museum railway near Bremen.
- Light railway
