= Class 89 =

Class 89 may refer to:

- British Rail Class 89
- German Class 89 tank locomotives with an 0-6-0T wheel arrangement operated by the Deutsche Reichsbahn and its successor administrations, comprising:
  - Class 89.0: Prussian T 8
  - Class 89.0^{II}: Einheitslokomotive
  - Class 89.1: Palatine T 3
  - Class 89.2: Saxon V T
  - Class 89.3-4: Württemberg T 3 and T 3 L
  - Class 89.6-7: Bavarian D II, Bavarian R 3/3
  - Class 89.8: DRG follow-on order of the Bavarian R 3/3
  - Class 89.9: various locomotives taken over by the Deutsche Reichsbahn (DRB period 1939–48)
  - Class 89.10: various locomotives taken over by the Deutsche Reichsbahn (DRB period 1939–48) der Bauart Prussian T 8
  - Class 89.11: PKP Class Tkh 29
  - Class 89.25: locomotive taken over by the Deutsche Reichsbahn (GDR)
  - Class 89.49: Prussian T 3 locomotive taken over by the Deutsche Reichsbahn (GDR) in 1949
  - Class 89.59: various locomotives taken over in 1949 by the Deutsche Reichsbahn (GDR)
  - Class 89.60: various locomotives taken over in 1949 by the Deutsche Reichsbahn (GDR)
  - Class 89.61: various locomotives taken over in 1949 by the Deutsche Reichsbahn (GDR)
  - Class 89.62: various locomotives taken over in 1949 by the Deutsche Reichsbahn (GDR)
  - Class 89.63: various locomotives taken over in 1949 by the Deutsche Reichsbahn (GDR)
  - Class 89.64: various locomotives taken over in 1949 by the Deutsche Reichsbahn (GDR)
  - Class 89.65: various locomotives taken over in 1949 by the Deutsche Reichsbahn (GDR)
  - Class 89.66: various locomotives taken over in 1949 by the Deutsche Reichsbahn (GDR)
  - Class 89.70-75: Prussian T 3
  - Class 89.75: Hafenbahn Bremen T 3.1
  - Class 89.75: various locomotives taken over in 1949 by the Deutsche Reichsbahn (GDR)
  - Class 89.78: Prussian T 7
  - Class 89.80: Mecklenburg T 3
  - Class 89.81: Bavarian D V
  - Class 89.81^{II}: PKP Class TKh17
  - Class 89.82: Saxon V T
  - Class 89.82^{II}: PKP Class TKh4
  - Class 89.82: various locomotives taken over in 1949 by the Deutsche Reichsbahn (GDR)
  - Class 89.830: Baden IX a
  - Class 89.835: locomotive taken over by the Deutsche Reichsbahn (GDR)
