= Class 79 =

Class 79 or 79 class may refer to:

- DRG Class 79, a German tank locomotive class with the pre-war Deutsche Reichsbahn and the post-war East German Deutsche Reichsbahn, comprising:
  - Class 79.0: Saxon XV HTV (1925–1933)
  - Class 79.0^{II}: BLE No. 44 (1938–1947)
  - Class 79.0^{III}: SNCF 1–242.TA.6xx, ex-Alsace-Lorraine T 20 taken over by the DR (1952–1963)
- New South Wales 79 class locomotive, diesel-electric locomotives
