= Saxon XV HTV =

Saxon XV HTV DRG Class 79
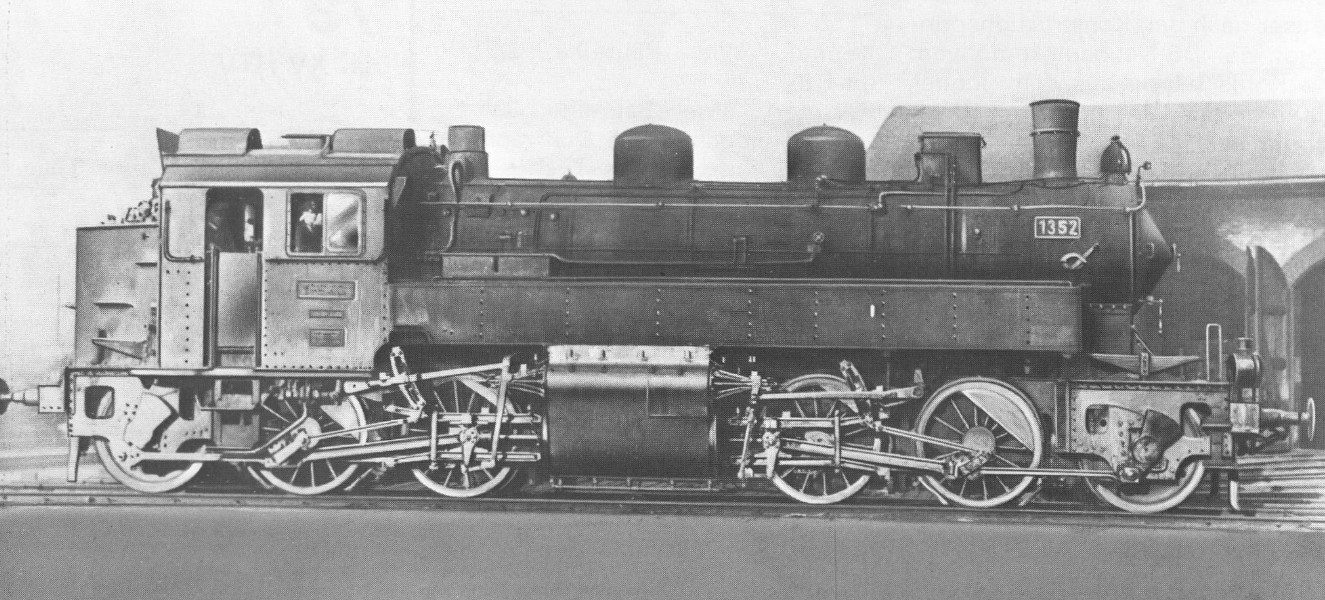
Type and origin
- Builder: Sächsische Maschinenfabrik, Chemnitz
- Build date: 1916
- Total produced: 2
Specifications
- Configuration
  - Whyte: 0-6-6-0T
  - UIC: C C h4vt
  - German: Pt 66.15
- Gauge: 1,435 mm (4 ft 8 1/2 in)
- Coupled dia.: 1,400 mm (4 ft 7 1/8 in)
- Minimum curve: 170 m (560 ft)
- Wheelbase
  - Overall: 11,100 mm (36 ft 5 in)
- Length
  - Over beams: 14,660 mm (48 ft 1 1/4 in)
- Axle load: 15.37 t (15.13 long tons; 16.94 short tons)
- Adhesive weight: 92.2 t (90.7 long tons; 101.6 short tons)
- Empty weight: 74.6 t (73.4 long tons; 82.2 short tons)
- Service weight: 92.2 t (90.7 long tons; 101.6 short tons)
- Fuel type: Coal
- Fuel capacity: 2.2 t (2.17 long tons; 2.43 short tons)
- Water cap.: 8.5 m^{3} (1,900 imp gal)
- Boiler
- No. of heating tubes: 124
- Heating tube length: 4,500 mm (14 ft 9 1/4 in)
- Boiler pressure: 15 bar (220 psi)
- Heating surface
  - Firebox: 2.5 m^{2} (27 sq ft)
  - Radiative: 11.29 m^{2} (121.5 sq ft)
  - Tubes: 78.90 m^{2} (849.3 sq ft)
  - Evaporative: 127.20 m^{2} (1,369.2 sq ft)
- Superheater
  - Heating area: 40.9 m^{2} (440 sq ft)
- Cylinders: 4
- High-pressure cylinder: 440 mm (17 5/16 in)
- Low-pressure cylinder: 680 mm (26 3/4 in)
- Piston stroke: 630 mm (24 13/16 in)
- Valve gear: Walschaerts (Heusinger)
- Auxiliary brake: Counterweight brake
Performance figures
- Maximum speed: 70 km/h (43 mph)
Career
- Numbers: 1351 and 1352; 79 001 and 79 002

The Saxon Class XV HTV was a class of goods train steam locomotive operated by the Royal Saxon State Railways, which had been conceived for hauling trains and acting as banking engines for routes in the Ore Mountains. In 1925 the Deutsche Reichsbahn grouped them into their DRG Class 79.0.

== History ==
The two locomotives were built in 1916 at the Sächsischen Maschinenfabrik, formerly Hartmann.

The undercarriage of the locomotives was unusual. Instead of an alternative proposal for a twelve-coupled locomotive with sideways-sliding Gölsdorf axles, as was realised a year later in the shape of the Württemberg K, the Saxon Railways decided on a proposal by their head of the engineering department, Lindner, for a design that was unique in Germany: the Saxon XV HTV was given two, fixed, six-coupled drives. This was mainly because they had doubts about the suitability of the Gölsdorf system for twelve-couplers. The outside axles were designed as Klien-Lindner axles and could be slid sideways by about 37 mm (1.5 in) from their centre position. The design of these axles required them to be fixed into an outside frame. In the centre of the locomotive was a double cylinder on each side, each with a high-pressure cylinder for the rear and a low-pressure cylinder for the front drive.

This design with its low stress on the rails, low inherent resistance and simple weight compensation was promising especially as it also avoided the use of cranked driving axles. Similar thoughts in the USA during the 1930s led to the development of duplex locomotives. Because the cylinders of adjacent axles also had 28 mm (1.1 in) of side play, the locomotive could negotiate radii of as little as 170 m (560 ft). Through the special design of the cylinders, the use of crank axles (Kropfachse) was avoided. Whilst this design enabled the steam lines between the high- and low-pressure cylinders to be extremely short, long admission and exhaust tubes were necessary.

The XV HTV soon proved to be expensive to maintain, particularly concerning the drives and the hollow axles; as a result no more were procured. Even the usual tendency of all compound engines to sway could not be eliminated by the Klien-Lindner configuration. Wear and tear on the wheel tyres changed the crank settings of the driving gear. That meant that the synchronisation of the drive had to be constantly adjusted, to ensure a balanced distribution of effort.

Nevertheless, the engines were successful in practice. They had impressive riding qualities right up to their top speed and wear and tear on the wheel flanges was low. The Deutsche Reichsbahn took both locomotives over as 79 001 and 79 002, but retired them by 1932.

The serial number 79 001 was allocated from 1938 to 1947 to BLE No. 44 of the former Brunswick State Railway Company and from 1951 it was given to the former French locomotive, 1-242.TA.602, which ended up in German hands after World War II.

== Design features ==
The boiler barrel comprised two shells with a diameter of 1,450 mm (4 ft 9 in). On the top were two steam domes which were connected by a pipe inside the boiler. Between steam dome and chimney was a sand box. The firebox was made of copper and position over the first axle of the rear drive. The smokebox superheater was of the Schmidt type.

The locomotive frame comprised an inside frame of 28 mm (1.1 in) thick plate, and an outside frame for the hollow axles of 20 mm (0.79 in) thick plate.

The four-cylinder compound cylinders were arranged horizontally on the outside and each drove its centre axle

== See also ==
- Royal Saxon State Railways
- List of Saxon locomotives and railbuses

== Sources ==
- Hütter, Ingo (2021). Die Dampflokomotiven der Baureihen 60 bis 91 der DRG, DRB, DB, und DR (in German). Werl: DGEG Medien. pp. 246–247. ISBN 978-3-946594-21-5.
- Näbrich, Fritz; Meyer, Günter; Preuß, Reiner (1984). Lokomotiv-Archiv Sachsen 1 (in German). Berlin: transpress VEB Verlag für Verkehrswesen.
- Weisbrod, Manfred; Müller, Hans; Petznik, Wolfgang (1978). Dampflokomotiven deutscher Eisenbahnen, Baureihe 60–96 (EFA 1.3) (in German) (4th ed.). Düsseldorf: Alba. pp. 93–95. ISBN 3-87094-083-2.
- Weisbrod, Manfred; Müller, Hans; Petznick, Wolfgang (1994). Deutsches Lok-Archiv: Dampflokomotiven 3 (Baureihen 61 - 98) (in German). Berlin: transpress. ISBN 3-344-70841-4.
