= Brunswick State Railway Company =

German railway company

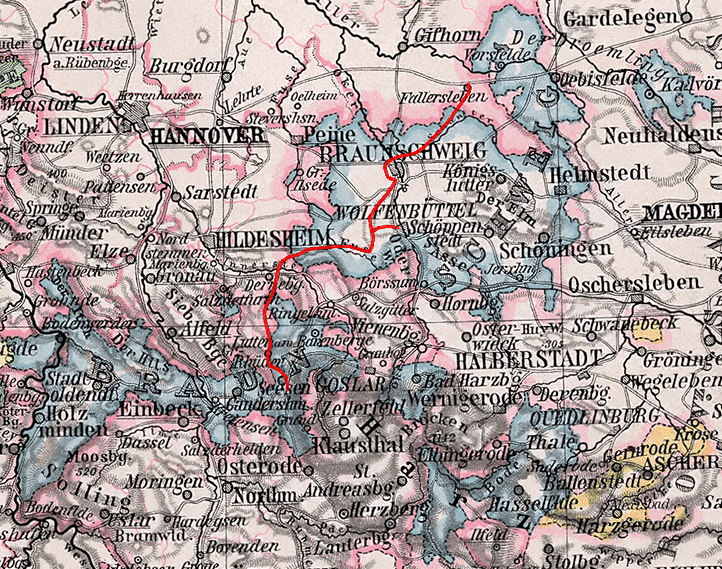
Brunswick State Railway around 1905

The Brunswick State Railway Company (Braunschweigische Landes-Eisenbahn-Gesellschaft) or BLE was a railway company in the Duchy of Brunswick, a former German state centred on the city of Brunswick (German: Braunschweig).

It was founded on 27 June 1884 by the Frankfurt bank of Erlanger & Söhne and Gebrüder Sulzbach with the aim of building and operating railways of secondary importance in the Duchy of Brunswick and the adjoining territories.

The Brunswick State Railway Company is not the same as the Duchy of Brunswick State Railway or the Brunswick Railway Company which did not exist when the BLE was founded.

== History ==
In its first two decades it built a total of 108 kilometres of standard gauge railways. They provided rail access for about 50 commercial firms and around one hundred warehouses in the city of Brunswick using a ring railway. The BLE lines also opened up the largely agricultural areas around this Residenz city as far as the foothills of the Harz. In this area the transportation of potash, which was mined there, played an important role for the railways and continued to do so until the 1920s.

The departure point for the Brunswick–Derneburg railway, the first BLE line, built on 18 July 1886, was Braunschweig Nord railway station, where the management and centre of operations was based. From here it ran to Braunschweig West (Wilhelmithor) and southwards to Hoheweg, where on 17 October 1886 a 4 km long branch to Wolfenbüttel turned off. The main line swung westwards and reached Derneburg station on the Hildesheim–Goslar railway via Lichtenberg and Osterlinde in what later became the Salzgitter industrial estate.

In the years that followed the Derneburg–Seesen railway from Derneburg – which again ran southwards – reached Bockenem in the Nette valley on 27 May 1887, Groß Rhüden on 1 October 1887 and finally the railway hub of Seesen on 1 May 1889. Apart from the construction of the northern section there was now a pause of about a decade. During this time the network was expanded with short link lines – some only for goods traffic – on 1 September 1886 from Braunschweig West station to the Hauptbahnhof and by turning the BLE stations into state railway stations on 1 January 1890 at Seesen and on 20 September 1890 at Wolfenbüttel.

On 11 November 1901 the line was opened from Braunschweig Nord via Gliesmarode (West) to Gliesmarode Ost, where the route of the newly built Braunschweig-Schöningen Railway (BSE) began, initially opened for goods traffic but from 15 February 1902 for passenger services as well. At first the BSE's trains started and terminated at the BLE's Nordbahnhof as well.

In Gliesmarode Schuntertalbahn branched off, forming a link to the Lehrter Bahn. It was opened on 31 August 1902 as far as Brunsrode-Flechtorf and on 1 November 1904 to Fallersleben by the BLE. This terminal, like two sections of the line at Derneburg and Bockenem was not in Brunswick territory, but in Prussia. In fact a total of 36 km of line was on Prussian territory – one third of the total track length.

The importance of the railway can be seen from the number of steam locomotives that was constant at around 25, whilst there was only one Benzol railbus. On 1 December 1927 two bus lines supplemented the passenger services.

About 10 years later the independent railway company was taken over. The creation of a large industrial complex in the area of Salzgitter required a fundamental change and expansion of the railway network there. The Reich government wanted to give this task to the state railway. So the BLE was merged into the Deutsche Reichsbahn on 1 January 1938, who rebuilt or closed some of the routes.

== Fleet ==
In 1936 the BLE had 26 steam locomotives, 2 railcars, 49 passenger coaches, 12 post vans and 725 goods wagons.

BLE number	DRG Class	Axle arrangement	Remarks
1...28	89 7531	C n2t	Prussian T 3
7–10		B n2t	
3^{II}, 5^{II}, 9^{II}, 29	53 7001–7004	C n2v	Prussian G 4.2 Taken over by the Reichsbahn in 1922
30	92 1081	D n2t	
31	92 421	D h2t	
32 and 33	91 201–202	1'C h2t	ELNA Class 5
34	89 7541	C n2t	Prussian T 3
35 and 37		C h2t	Prussian T 8
36, 39 to 43	91 131–136	1'C n2t	Prussian G 9.2 Taken over by the Reichsbahn in 1929/1930
38			Unused
44	79 001^{II}	1'D1' h2t	
45 to 49	75 601–605	1'C1' h2t	
T1	137 237	(1A)(A1)	
T2	137 238a	2'2' + A1A + 2'2'	
