= Prussian T 3 =

Class of German steam locomotives

Prussian T 3 DRG Class 89.70–75 DR Class 89.62 PKP class TKh1 SRT Class 51-56
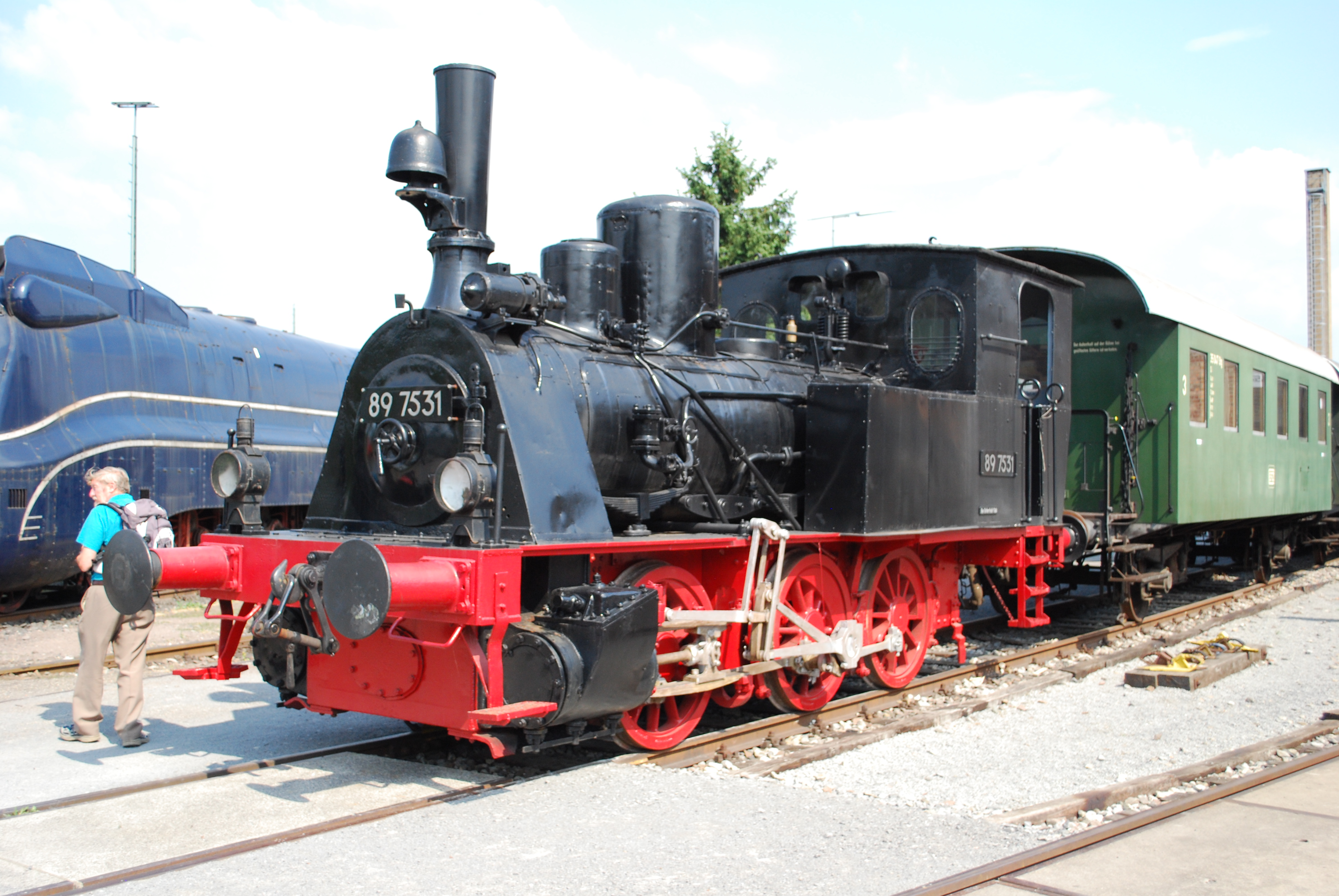
- DRG Class 89.7531 at the South German Railway Museum in 2011
Type and origin
- Power type: Steam
- Builder: Henschel and others
- Build date: 1882–1924
- Total produced: 1,804
Specifications
- Configuration
  - Whyte: 0-6-0T
  - German: Gt 33.10
- Gauge: 1,435 mm (4 ft 8 1/2 in) Standard gauge 1,520 mm (4 ft 11 27/32 in) Russian gauge (Poland); 1,000 mm (3 ft 3 3/8 in) Cape gauge (Thailand)
- Driver dia.: 1,100 mm (3 ft 7 1/4 in)
- Length
  - Over beams: 8,300 mm (27 ft 2 3/4 in); 8,951 mm (29 ft 4 1/2 in)
- Axle load: 10.0–12.0 tonnes (9.8–11.8 long tons; 11.0–13.2 short tons)
- Adhesive weight: 28.9–31.9 tonnes (28.4–31.4 long tons; 31.9–35.2 short tons)
- Service weight: 28.9–31.9 tonnes (28.4–31.4 long tons; 31.9–35.2 short tons)
- Fuel type: Coal
- Fuel capacity: Coal: 1.9 tonnes (1.9 long tons; 2.1 short tons)
- Water cap.: 5,000 L (1,100 imp gal; 1,300 US gal)
- Boiler pressure: 12 bar (1.20 MPa; 174 psi)
- Heating surface
  - Firebox: 1.86 m^{2} (20.0 sq ft)
  - Evaporative: 55.67 m^{2} (599.2 sq ft)
- Cylinders: 2
- Cylinder size: 350 mm (13 3/4 in)
- Piston stroke: 550 mm (21 5/8 in)
- Loco brake: some with compressed-air brakes
Performance figures
- Maximum speed: 40 km/h (25 mph)
- Indicated power: 213 kW (290 PS; 286 hp)
Career
- Operators: KPEV; DRG; DB; DR; PKP; SRT; Private and industrial railways
- Numbers: DRG: 7001–7511; PKP: 1–33; SRT: 51–56
- Locale: Germany (later East and West Germany); Luxembourg; Poland; Italy; Thailand; China
- Retired: DB: 1961; PKP: 1967; DR: 1968
- Preserved: 31 locomotives (16 in Germany) (6 in Italy) (4 in Poland) (1 in the Netherlands) (1 in Hungary) (1 in Czech Republic) (1 in France) (1 in Thailand)

The Prussian Class T 3 steam locomotives procured for the Prussian State Railways were 0-6-0 tank locomotives intended for local mixed traffic and shunting work. Together with the Prussian T 2, they were the first steam locomotives built according to the standard designs. The first units were delivered by Henschel in 1882, and the Prussian State Railway procured the class until 1910. Similar steam locomotives were also built for other customers, with the last one delivered in 1924. In total, more than 1,500 T 3 locomotives and identical locomotives were built. The main purchasers, besides the Prussian State Railway, were primarily small and industrial railways. In the 1920s, a large portion of the locomotives were retired by the newly founded Deutsche Reichsbahn; nevertheless, numerous locomotives remained in service long after the Second World War. The last locomotive – an industrial engine in Poland – was withdrawn in 1988. A total of 29 locomotives have been preserved.

Prussian T 3 locomotives and related types were among the most widely distributed, longest-serving, and most successful Prussian locomotives. The T 3 of the Prussian railways primarily included standardized locomotives of the III-4e design, but it also encompassed the less common III-4p design and several other locomotives. In practice, many identical or similar locomotives built for other regional, private, and industrial railways are associated with the class. Although these locomotives were not formally classified as part of the T3 series, they were similar in construction, and some later shared the fate of the machines of the class on other railways, including German railways as well as the Polish State Railways (PKP).

== History ==
The predecessors of this design were a class of five steam locomotives with a C axle arrangement, produced in 1881–1882 by Henschel in Cassel for the private Bergisch-Märkische Eisenbahn (BME). They featured a twin engine with a cylinder diameter of 350 mm (14 in) and a piston stroke of 530 mm (21 in), as well as wheels with a diameter of 1,060 mm (42 in). After the nationalization of the railways in 1882, they were taken over by the Prussian railways and later also classified as part of the T3 class. Most likely, the design, slightly modified, was subsequently selected by the Prussian standardization committee as a typical design for the Prussian railways.

Since 1882, Henschel and other German manufacturers began the production of a standardized type of tank locomotive with a C axle arrangement for the Prussian railways, designated as standardized model (Musterblatt) III-4e (originally, until 1883: M 12). They were equipped with a twin-cylinder engine with a cylinder diameter of 350 mm (14 in) and a piston stroke of 550 mm (22 in), and initially wheels with a diameter of 1,080 mm (43 in). After the introduction of the classification system for the Prussian railways in 1906, these locomotives were designated as T 3 (the letter T signified tank locomotives). In addition to 1302 locomotives of the III-4e type, the T3 group also included 52 reinforced locomotives of the III-4p type, produced between 1904 and 1906. In total, the Prussian railways received 1,354 standardized locomotives of the T3 group, produced up to 1906. Added to this were three locomotives acquired before 1910 from private railways.

Almost all renowned German locomotive manufacturers were involved in the production, numbering 19 of them:

- Henschel & Son (385)
- Union Giesserei Königsberg (126)
- Hannoversche Maschinenbau AG (106)
- Schichau-Werke (105)
- Maschinenfabrik Christian Hagans (100)
- Hohenzollern Locomotive Works (93)
- Elsässische Maschinenbau-Gesellschaft Grafenstaden (93)
- Borsig Locomotive Works (76)
- Arnold Jung Lokomotivfabrik (73)
- Orenstein & Koppel (51)
- Maschinenbau Anstalt Humboldt (44)
- AG Vulcan Stettin (30)
- Schwartzkopff (30)
- Stahlbahnwerke Freudenstein (13)
- Linke-Hofmann-Werke AG (10)
- Maschinenbau-Gesellschaft Karlsruhe (10)
- Sächsische Maschinenfabrik (4)
- Maschinenfabrik Esslingen (4)
- Mecklenburgische Waggonfabrik-Aktiengesellschaft (1)

In this, 3 of the locomotive manufacturers were involved in production of the reinforced III-4p locomotives:

- Maschinenfabrik Christian Hagans (25)
- Orenstein & Koppel (17)
- Stahlbahnwerke Freudenstein (10)

Due to different manufacturers and a long production period, the locomotives differed from each other in details and characteristics, but within each of the two designs the differences were not significant. Early locomotives of the III-4e design did not have a steam dome, having only a throttle in a small casing on the boiler. However, soon, in the 1890s, in the second version locomotives, a sizable bell-shaped steam dome appeared on the boiler, and the wheel diameter was increased from 1080 to 1,100 mm (43 in). Earlier locomotives were also modernized in this way. The first series had the rear wall of the cab cut obliquely at the bottom, whereas the others had a flat rear wall, and consequently were 29 cm (11 in) longer. Differences in weight did not exceed one ton. Greater differences appeared only in the reinforced locomotives of the III-4p model. The boiler parameters remained similar, and the engine cylinder dimensions were also retained, but their service weight increased from 29.2 t (64,000 lb) to 36.8 t (81,000 lb), and the axle load increased from 10 t (22,000 lb) to 12.7 t (28,000 lb), while the coal and water reserves were increased. All standardized locomotives had a characteristic uneven wheelbase: 1.7 m (67 in) between the first and second axle and 1.3 m (51 in) between the second and third axle. Another distinctive feature was the short coal bunkers on both sides of the boiler in front of the cab, as well as the internal water tank in the frame, which was connected by vertical pipes in front of the coal bunkers. In the III-4p model locomotives, the boiler was placed 20 cm (7.9 in) higher, but apart from the slightly longer coal bunkers (reaching the middle axle), they did not differ significantly externally from the later III-4e model locomotives.

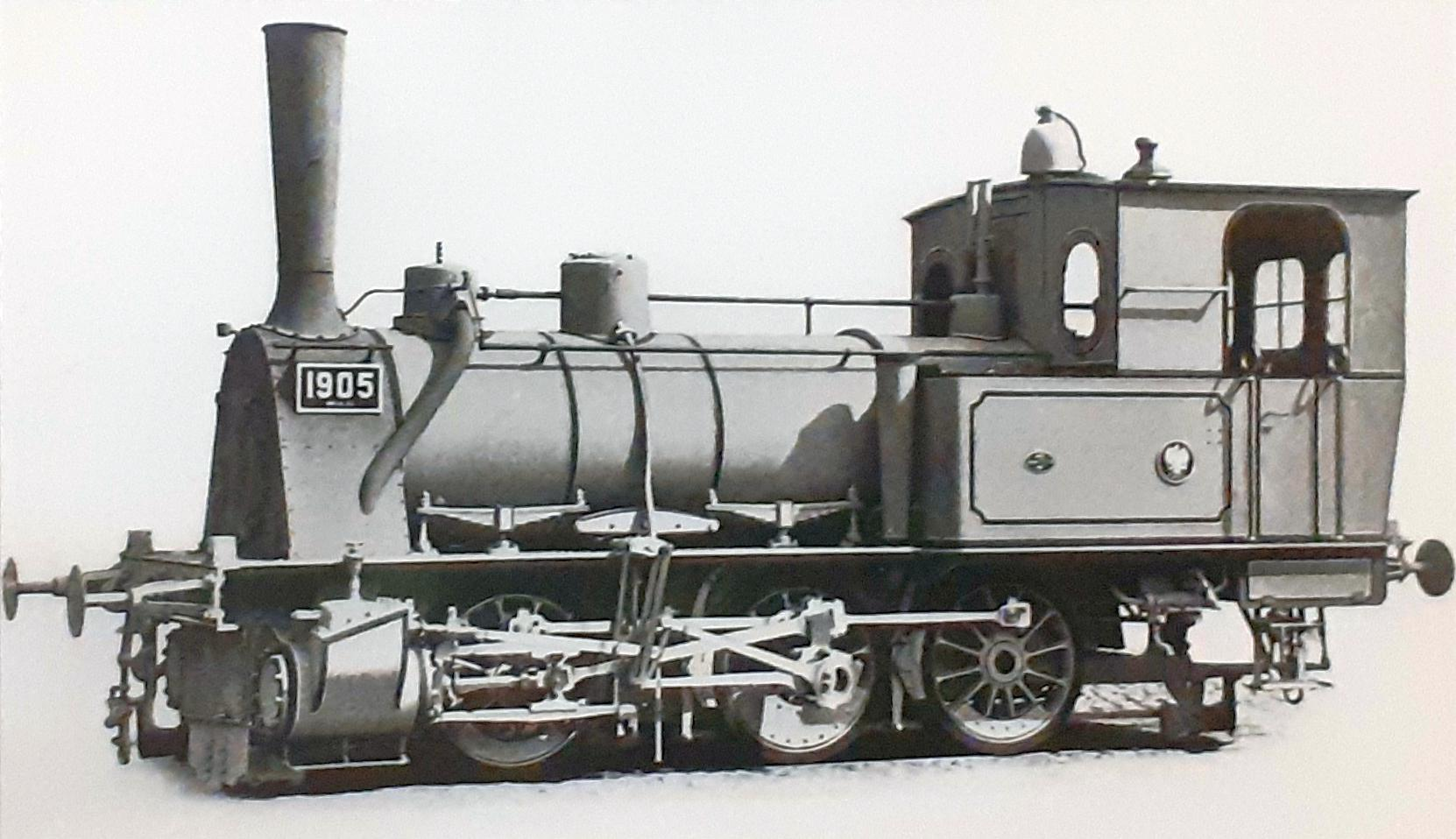
T 3 of the earliest build

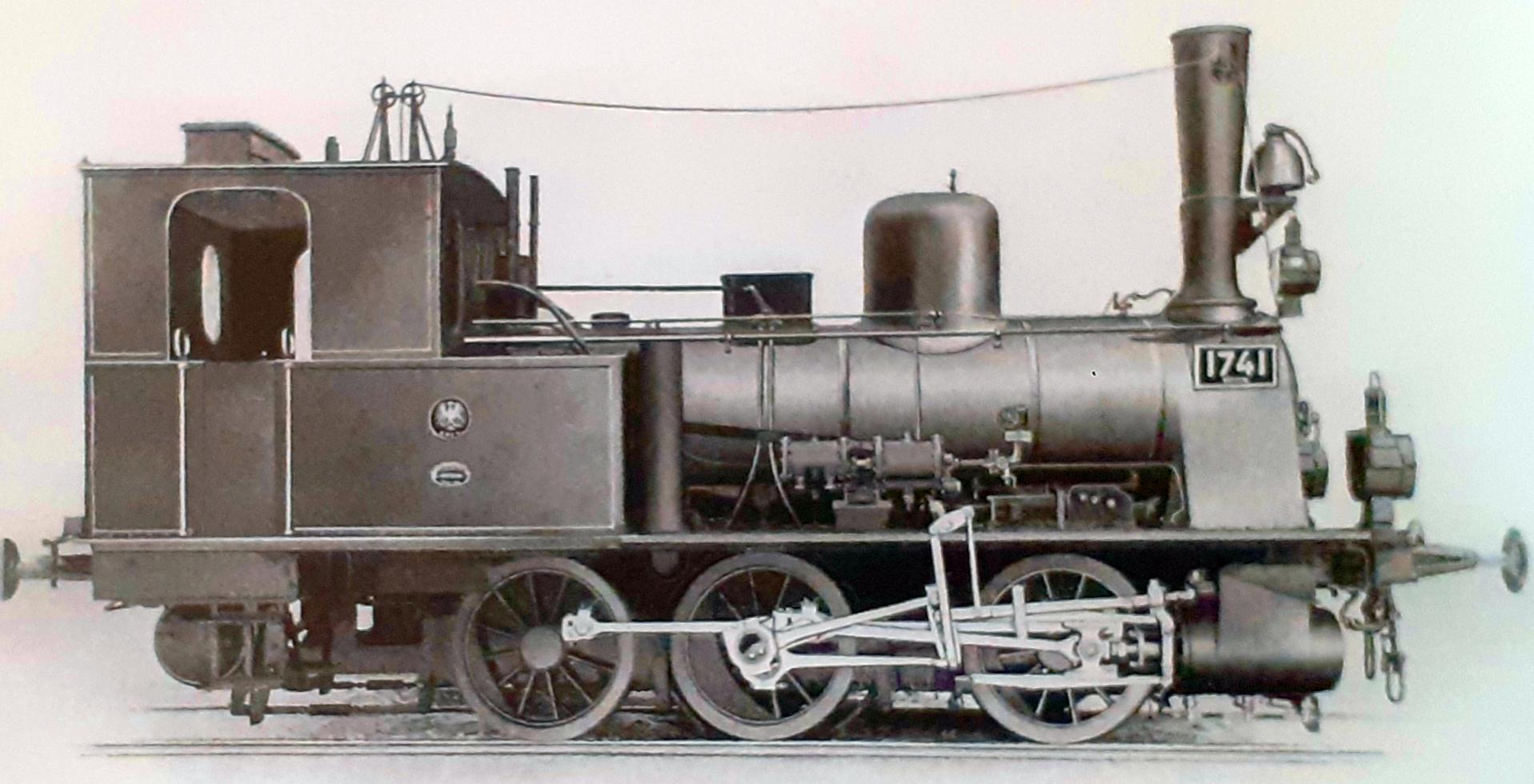
T 3 of the latest build

In addition to 1,357 standardized locomotives of the III-4e and 4p models, 15 non-standardized locomotives were classified into the T3 group in Prussia, including five of the aforementioned earlier tank engines of the BME railway, as well as five early tank engines with the same axle arrangement produced by Henschel for the Main-Weser railway in 1881 (cylinder diameter 360 mm (14 in), piston stroke 540 mm (21 in), wheel diameter 1,130 mm (44 in). Additionally, the T3 group included one of three locomotives built with a different B1 axle arrangement, model III-4g (Posen 6101) – bringing the total number of T3 group locomotives to 1,373.

Companies producing standardized III-4e type steam locomotives for the Prussian railways also built numerous locomotives of the same or a similar model for various private and industrial railways within the German Empire. Some differed in weight, engine cylinder dimensions, steam pressure, and boiler surface area, but they maintained the same design and characteristic asymmetric wheel spacing (1.7 / 1.3 m). Twenty locomotives were built for export to China, and another twenty to Italy, among which was the last locomotive constructed according to the III-4e design – in 1924 by Henschel for the Valtellina Railway.

== Musterblatt III-4e design ==
Tender locomotive with a C axle arrangement, equipped with a twin engine for saturated steam. Locomotives of different series and manufacturers varied in details and characteristics. Despite its small size, the boiler was very efficient and had a large firebox. The boiler barrel had a length of 3,420 mm (135 in) and accommodated 132 fire tubes. The boiler was positioned fairly low – the boiler axis in early locomotives was at a height of 1,860 mm (73 in) above the tracks, in later models – 1,870 mm (74 in) (due to an increase in wheel diameter by 20 mm (0.79 in)), and in M III-4p locomotives at a height of 2,070 mm (81 in). The grate had a surface area of 1.3 m², and in M III-4p locomotives – 1.35 m². The heating surface of the boiler typically measured 61.1 m², and in M III-4p locomotives – 61 m².

Initially, locomotives did not have a steam dome on the boiler, but only a throttle in a small housing, from which external pipes ran to the cylinders. Locomotives produced from the 1890s already had a fairly large cylindrical steam collector on the boiler, shifted further back. All series also had a small sandbox on the boiler. Most locomotives had a Latowski-type steam bell on the boiler (mounted in various locations). The first series had a rear wall of the cab that was cut obliquely at the bottom and a total length of 8,300 mm (27 ft 3 in), while the others had a vertical rear wall, and due to the extension of the frame at the rear (up to the rear wall), their length increased to 8,591 mm (28 ft 2.2 in), and in the III-4p model to 8,780 mm (28 ft 10 in). A characteristic feature of the appearance of locomotives of this type was the short coal boxes on both sides of the boiler in front of the cab, holding 1.1 t (2,400 lb) of coal (1.9 t (4,200 lb) in M III-4p locomotives), as well as the slanted side covers of the smokebox. The water tank was internal in the frame, with a capacity of 3.5–4 m³, into which water was poured through characteristic vertical pipes in front of the coal boxes, often funnel-shaped at the top. In III-4p type locomotives, the capacity was 5 m³.

The steam locomotives had a twin engine with a cylinder diameter of 350 mm (14 in) and a piston stroke of 550 mm (22 in), with an Allan external valve gear. The wheel diameter was initially 1,080 mm (43 in), and in the 1890s it was increased to 1,100 mm (43 in). Initially, the locomotives had a hand brake, and later they were equipped with steam or pneumatic brakes. A Heberlein mechanical brake was used to brake the train.

The frame was made of plate steel, with a frame thickness of 10 mm (0.39 in). The distance between the outer axles was 3 meters, with a distance of 1.7 m (67 in) between the first and second axles and 1.3 m (51 in) between the second and third axles. The axles were rigidly mounted, but the wheels of the driving axle (the second) had flanges reduced by 15 mm (0.59 in), allowing the locomotive to negotiate curves with a radius of 100 m (330 ft). The axle load was up to 10 t (22,000 lb) (12.7 t (28,000 lb) in the M III-4p type).

The Prussian T3 could pull freight trains loaded with a mass of 545 t (1,202,000 lb) at a speed of 40 km/h (25 mph) on a level track, and on a 20‰ incline, it could haul 80 t (180,000 lb) trains at a speed of 30 km/h (19 mph).

A locomotive preserved in Germany of a similar type to the T3 locomotive

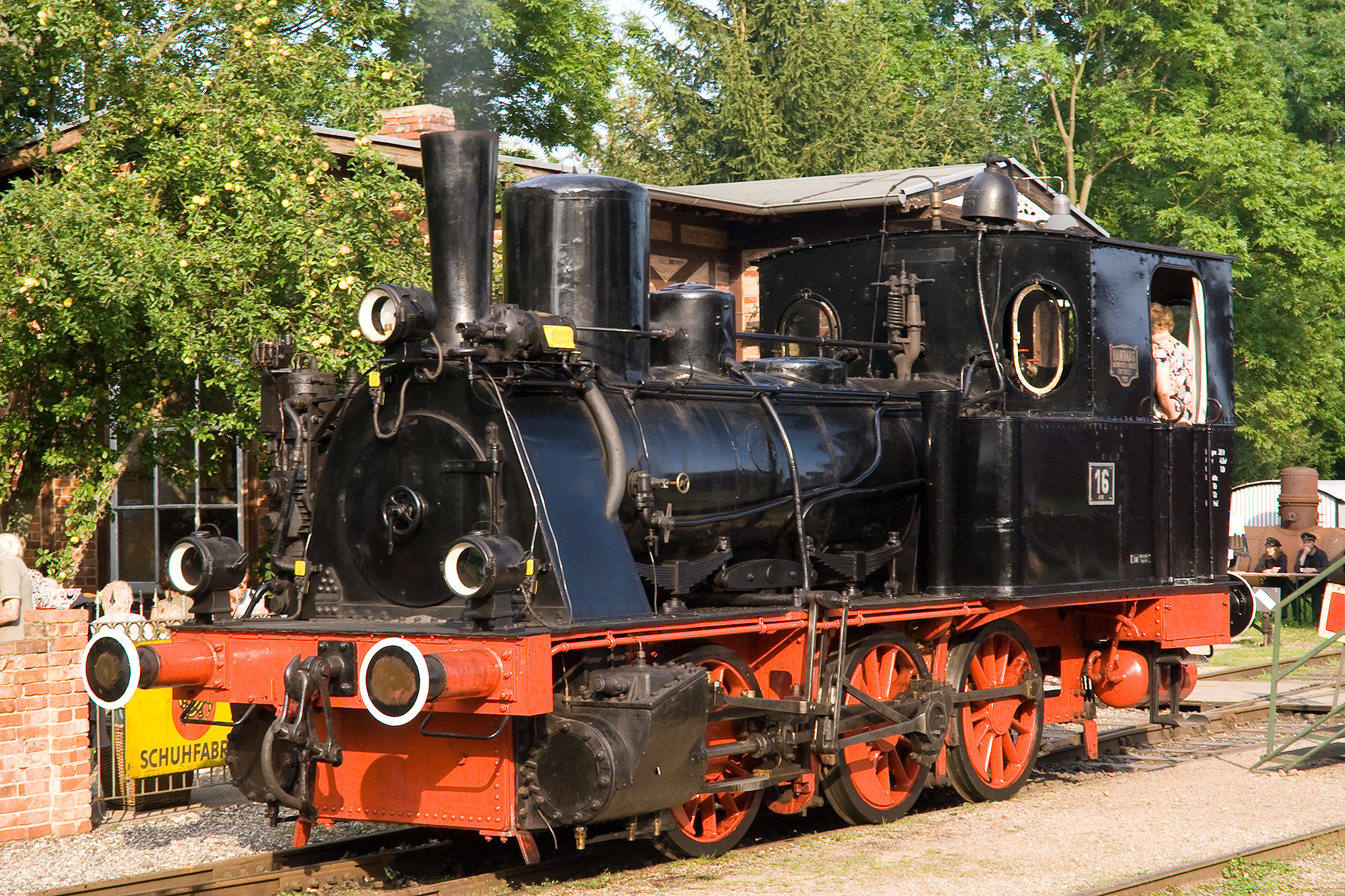
Front right view

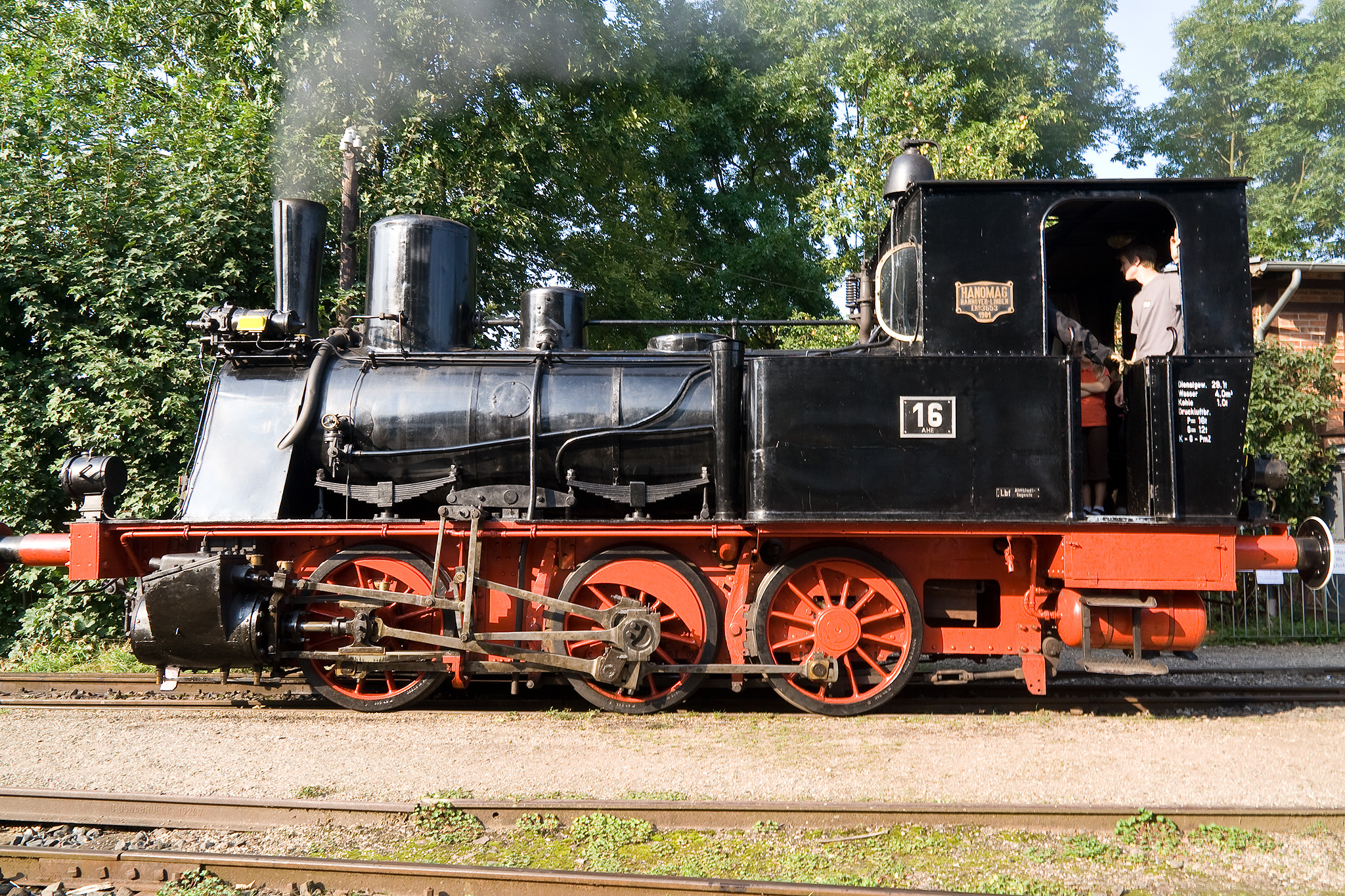
Side view

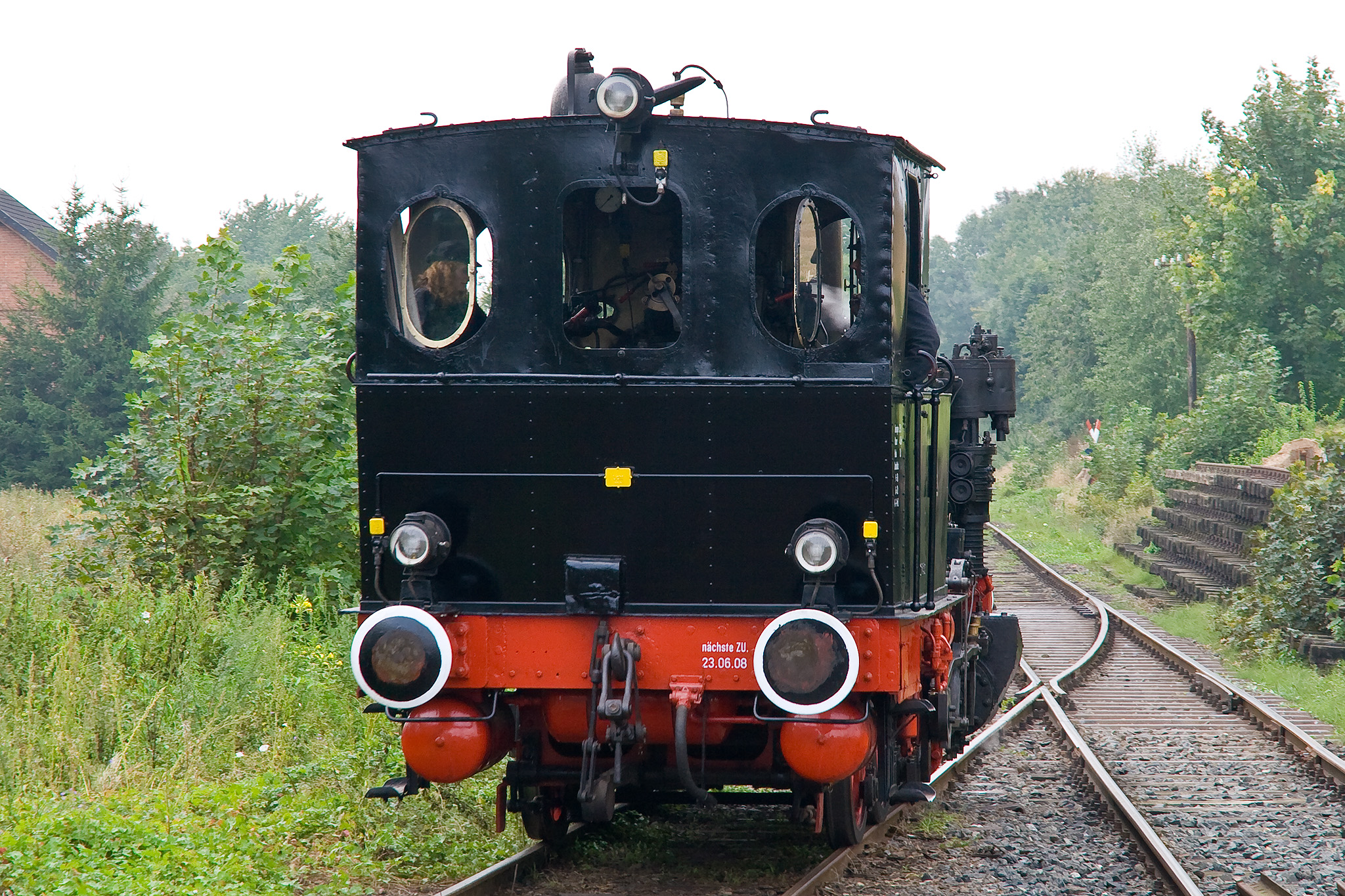
Rear view

== Locomotives of similar types on other railways ==
A total of more than 1,300 T 3s were built for the Prussian state railways. But many other railways in Germany and abroad, from industrial railways to national railways, also bought locomotives based on the T 3 pattern:

- Grand Duchy of Mecklenburg Friedrich-Franz Railway
- Grand Duchy of Oldenburg State Railways
- Brunswick State Railway
- Kreis Oldenburger Railway
- Zschipkau-Finsterwald Railway
- Lower Lusatian Railway
- German Railway Operating Company
- Shantung railway (China)
- Chemins de fer Prince Henri (Luxembourg)
- Società Veneta (Italy)
- State Railway of Thailand (Thailand)

=== Mecklenburg ===
Apart from Prussia, only two other German railway administrations used locomotives of a related type. The main user outside Prussia was Mecklenburg, whose Grand Duchy of Mecklenburg Friedrich-Franz Railway purchased 68 locomotives corresponding to the III-4e model between 1882 and 1906, built in 8 factories (Borsig, Güstrow, Hanomag, Henschel, Hohenzollern, Jung, Linke-Hofmann, and Schichau). The locomotives of the first series were designated as Mecklenburg type T3a and corresponded to the early Prussian locomotives with a cutout rear wall of the cab and a throttle without a steam collector, but with wheels of 1,100 mm (43 in) in diameter. The newer series of locomotives, built from 1900 onwards, were designated T3b. These railways were later taken over by the German Railways, and in 1925 there were still 40 locomotives in existence, which received new series numbers 89^{80} (89 8001 to 8022 and 89 8051 to 8068).

=== Oldenburg ===
Between 1898 and 1901, the Grand Duchy of Oldenburg purchased 12 locomotives of a type corresponding to the III-4e model (numbers 123–146) from the Hanomag works, and then in 1909, three modified locomotives (numbers 194–196). They were designated as the Oldenburg T3 series. The 1909 locomotives had a slightly smaller grate (1.01 m²) and boiler heating surface (57.2 m²), as well as a boiler shortened by 230 mm (9.1 in). They were also distinguished by the absence of a steam collecting dome on the boiler (steam was discharged through a pipe placed in the boiler to the throttle in the smokebox). After World War I, the Oldenburg locomotives were taken over by the German Railways as series 982, receiving numbers from 98 201 to 215 (unlike the Prussian T3s, they were classified in group 98, assigned to locomotives of former regional railways). By 1927, they had been retired or sold.

Three locomotives corresponding to the III-4e model were also used by the district Oldenburg railway Kreis Oldenburger Eisenbahn (KOE). Together with a fourth similar but more powerful one, produced by Henschel (Bismarck type), they were taken over on 1 August 1941 by the German railways and designated in series 8975 (89 7556 to 7559).

=== Lower Lusatia ===
Ten locomotives matching the M III-4e model were acquired between 1890 and 1905 by the Zschipkau-Finsterwalder railway in Lower Lusatia (fleet numbers 3–12). A further three locomotives (numbers 13–15), acquired by 1912, were of a reinforced type, developed by Borsig for private railways, with a weight of 43 tonnes (95,000 lb). On 1 July 1943, this railway was taken over by the DRG, and the locomotives numbered 11–15 were classified under series 8975 (89 7560 to 89 7564).

=== Brunswick ===
24 locomotives of a type similar to the Prussian T3 were used by the Brunswick State Railway (Braunschweigische Landeseisenbahn, BLE), which was taken over in 1938 by the DRG. 10 were built between 1895 and 1896 in Esslingen and generally corresponded to the III-4e model, with a length of 8,300 mm (27 ft 3 in), but they were slightly heavier (31 t (68,000 lb)). 14 newer ones were built by Hanomag between 1904 and 1917 and were longer (8,820 mm (28 ft 11 in)) to increase coal (1.5 t (3,300 lb)) and water (5 m³) capacity, heavier (36 t (79,000 lb)), with cylinders of 380 mm (15 in) in diameter and a grate enlarged to 1.59 m². One locomotive of the older type, 9 of the newer type, and one more of a similar type of ex-private Henschel production were taken over by the DRG railways and classified as series 8975 (numbers 89 7531 to 7541).

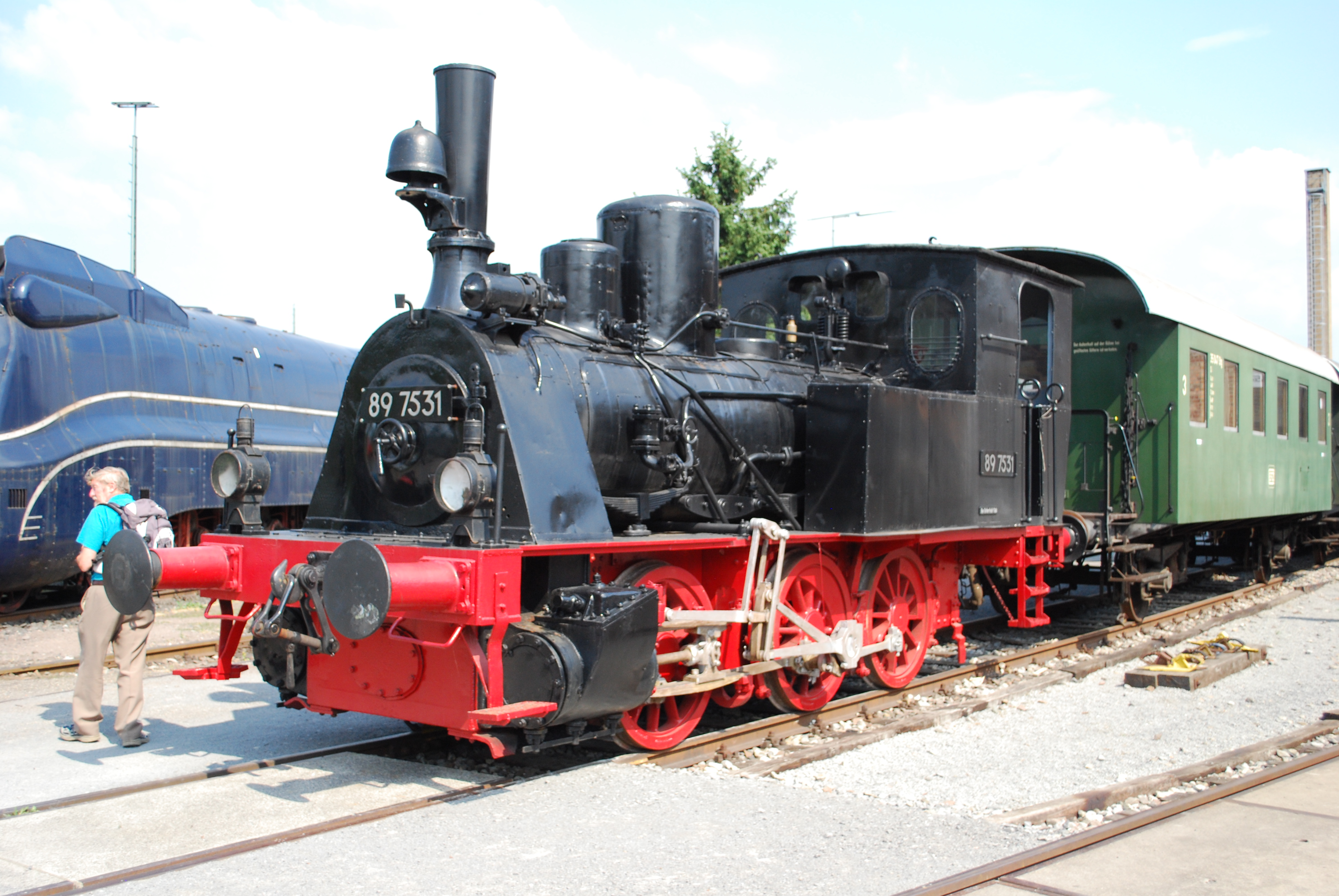
DRG 89.7531 of the T3 class from the former Brunswick State Railway

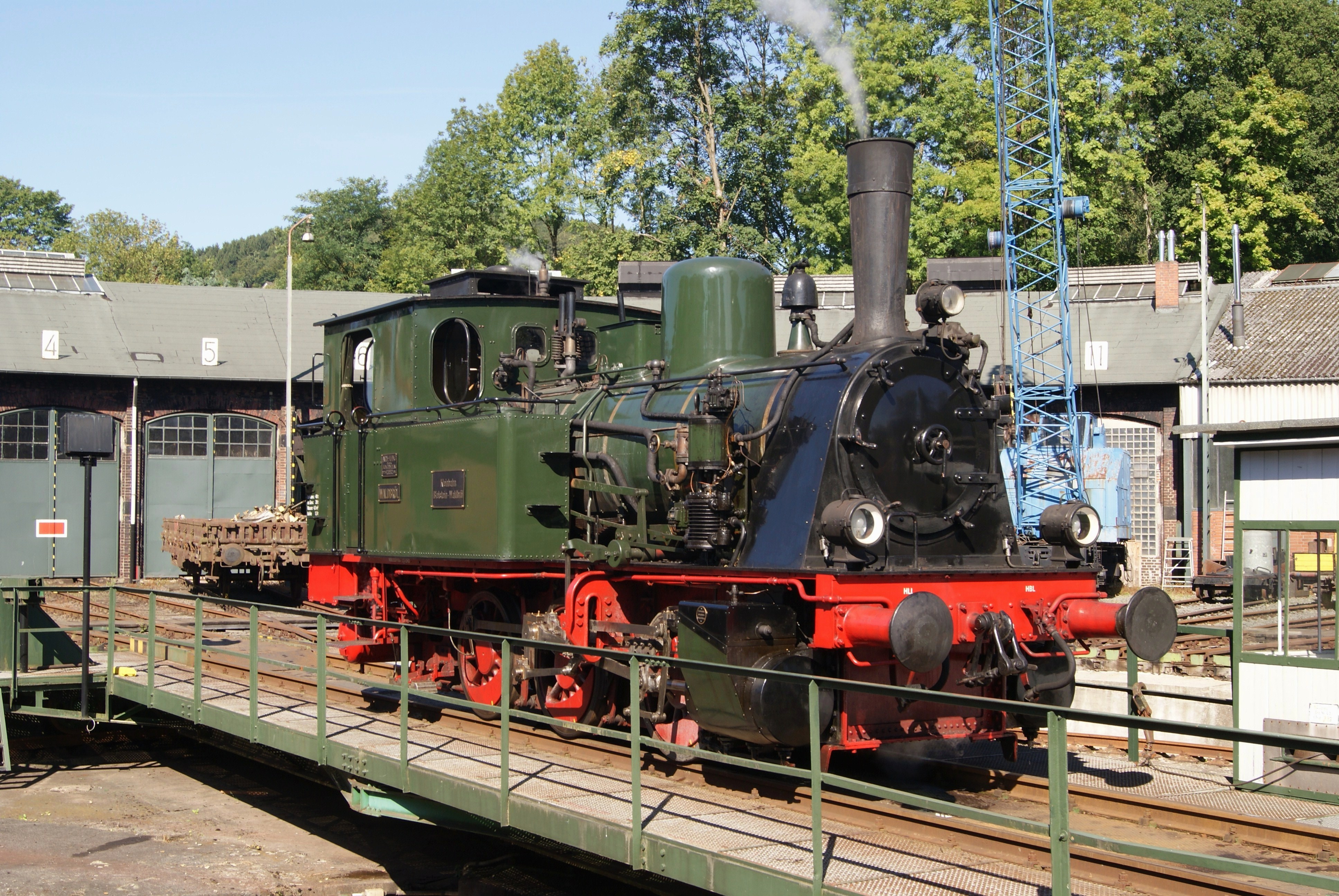
The locomotive "Waldbröl" of a modified Jung type (with a coal box at the back)

=== Bremen ===
Similar to the T3 series locomotives, with the same wheelbase, but somewhat stronger and heavier, were the Pudel-type tank locomotives, developed in several versions by the Jung company for industrial railways (service weight up to 38.5 t (85,000 lb), axle load up to 13 t (29,000 lb), cylinder diameter 400 mm (16 in), heating surface 77.9 m²). They were externally distinguished by having a small coal bunker at the rear of the cab. Among other things, between 1912 and 1916, 9 units were built for the port railway in Bremen (Bremer Hafenbahn), and in 1920, one more, heavier than the rest (axle load 15.5 t (34,000 lb)). In 1930, these locomotives were taken over by the DRG and classified as class 8975 (numbers 89 7512 to 7521).

=== Württemberg ===
Similar to the Prussian T3 series but distinguished, was the Württemberg T3 (wü T3), developed in 1891 by Krauss in Munich, produced in a quantity of 110 units by Krauss and the machine factories in Esslingen and Heilbronn. With the same wheelbase of the outer axles and similar axle arrangement, the most significant structural difference was the use of the Heusinger valve gear; there were also dimensional differences (wheelbase 1,720 (68) / 1,280 mm (50 in), wheel diameter 1,045 mm (41.1 in), cylinder diameter and piston stroke 380 (15) / 540 mm (21 in)). The first 13 locomotives had short water tanks with a capacity of 3 m³, the remaining ones had long tanks reaching up to the smokebox with a total capacity of 5.3 m³ and a coal bunker above the left water tank. They were taken over by the German railways DRG as class 893-4 (89 301 – 89 410).

=== Thailand ===
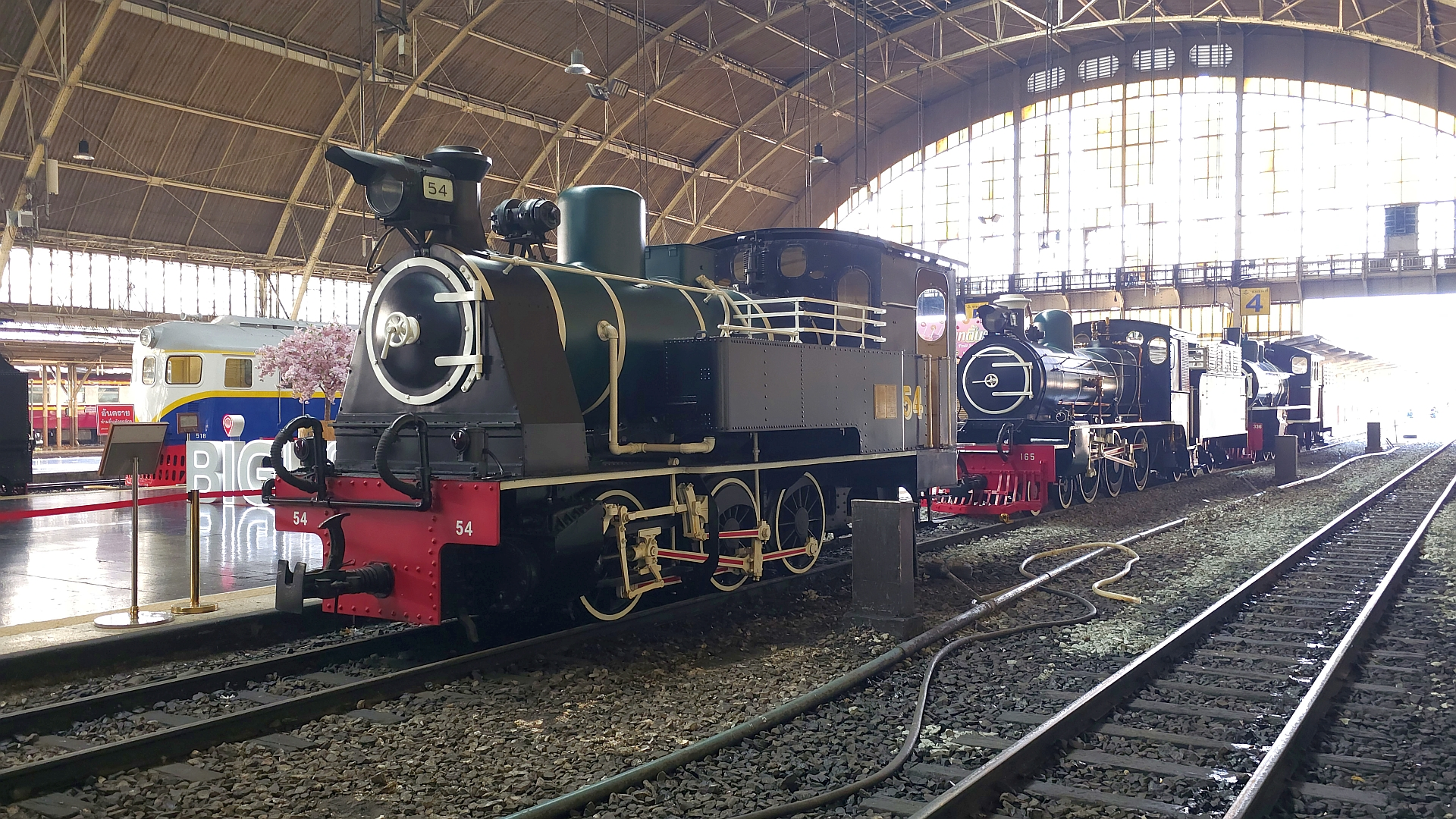
SRT Class 54 of the State Railway of Thailand at Hua Lamphong railway station

Six locomotives of the type were known to be operated by the State Railway of Thailand in Thailand, each coal bunkers were placed in the front of the cab both next to the boiler, and the track gauge was decreased to 1,000 mm (3 ft 3 3/8 in). They were classified as SRT Class 51 and numbered 51 to 56.

== Locomotives on German railways ==
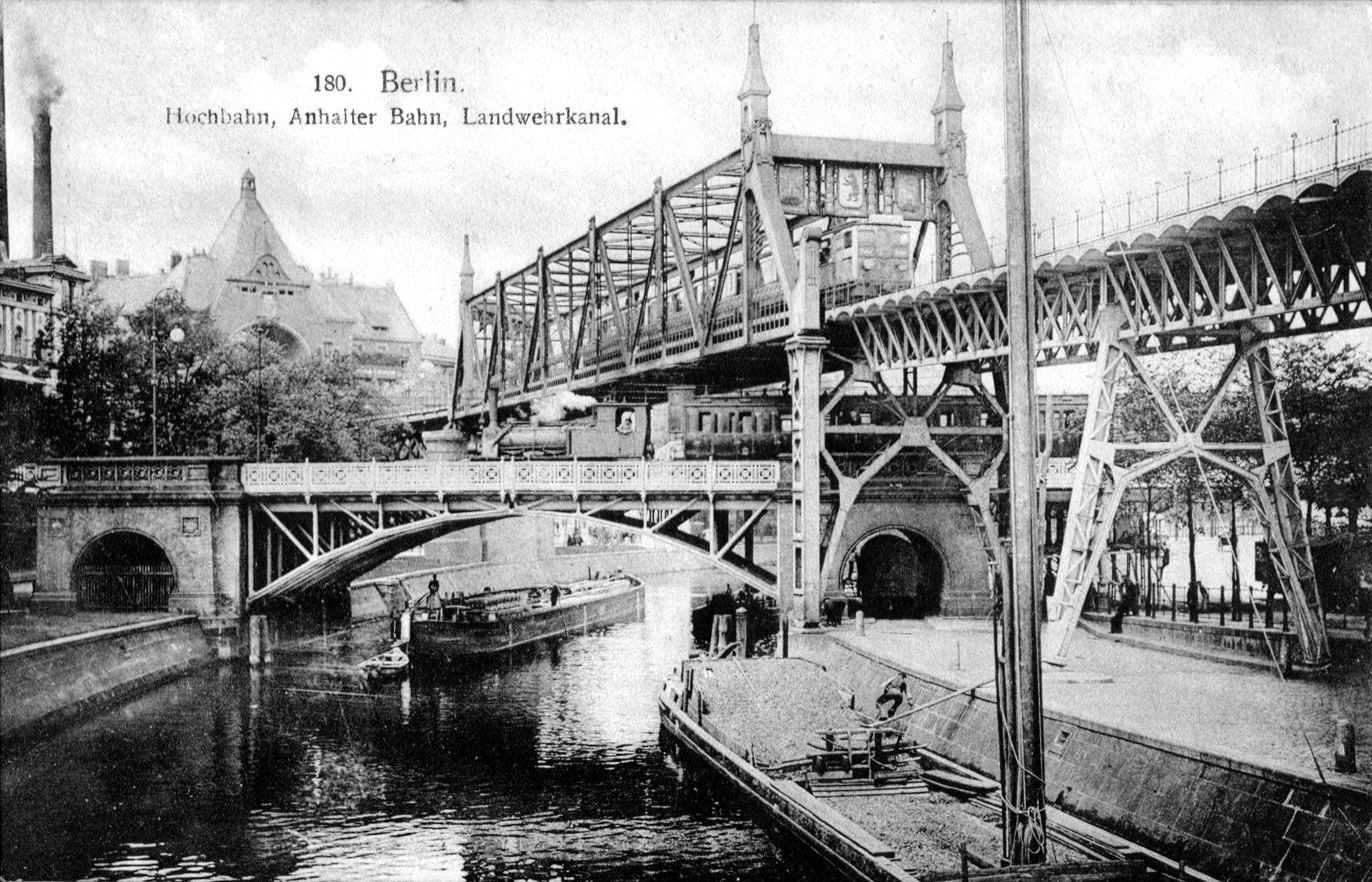
A T 3 crosses the Landwehr Canal in Berlin with a passenger train (ca. 1900).

The T3 series locomotives were initially used primarily for pulling mixed trains on local lines, as well as for shunting work. Their advantages included simplicity of design and ease of maintenance. Over the years, when, by the end of the 19th century, speeds on local lines increased to 50 km/h (31 mph), they were mainly reassigned to shunting duties, and some were sold to industrial railways. After 1906, the Prussian railways had a total of 1,373 of all variants, and in 1915 – 998. Initially, in the various railway divisions, they carried fleet numbers usually in the 1700 series (numbers were repeated across divisions). After 1906, in the respective divisions, they were assigned numbers ranging from 6101 to 6400.

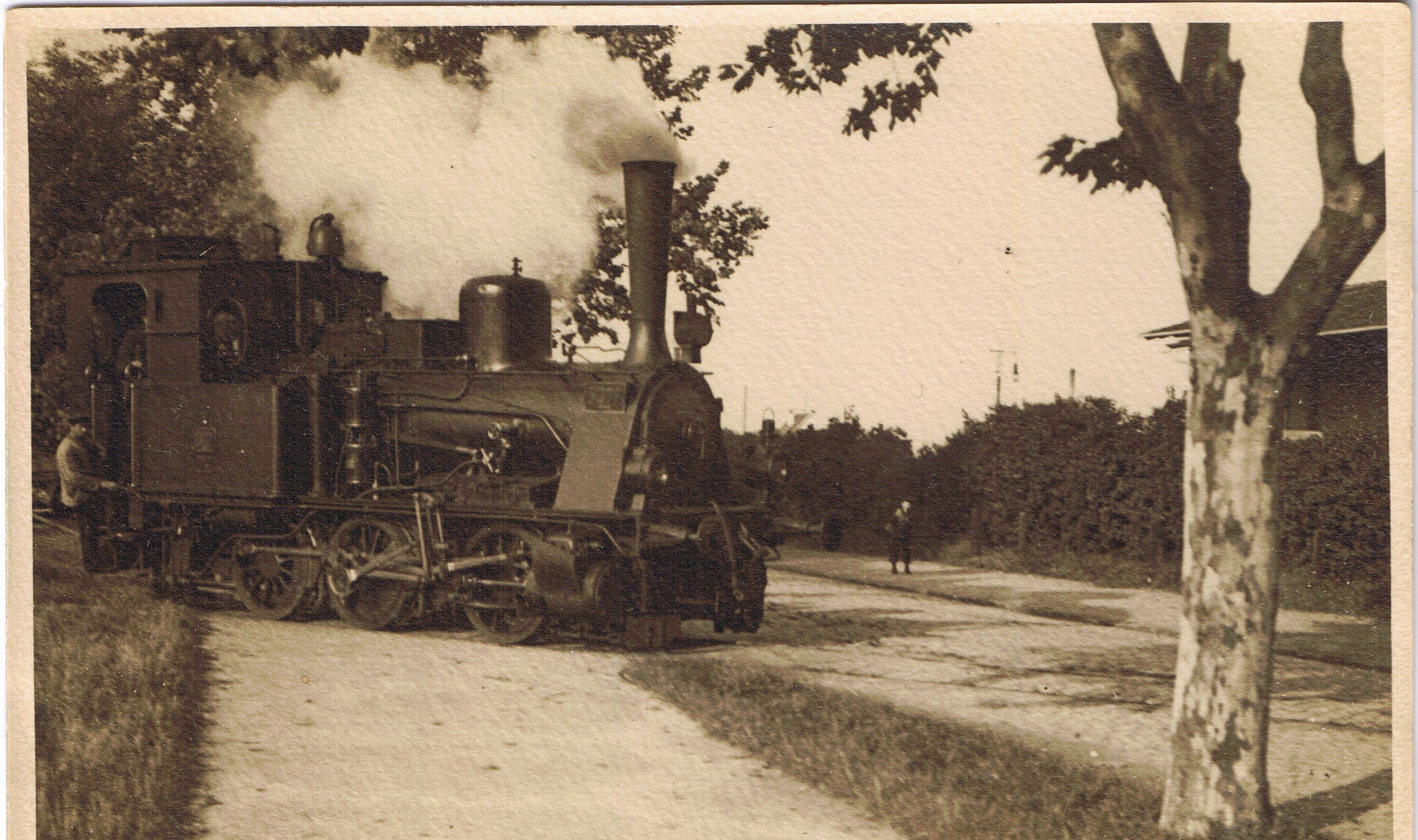
T 3 locomotive in service before the First World War (ca. 1914)

After World War I, most Prussian locomotives were transferred to the Deutsche Reichsbahn (DRG), subsequently designated there as series (Baureihe, BR) 89^{70-75}. According to the initial temporary plan of 1923, it was intended to renumber 745 locomotives. Despite being assigned numbers over 7000, indicating in the DRG system obsolete series intended for rapid retirement, these locomotives were very useful, and some of them proved to be quite long-lived. In 1932, there were 175 in service, and in 1938 – 12. During World War II, locomotives captured in Poland were assigned new numbers in series 8975.

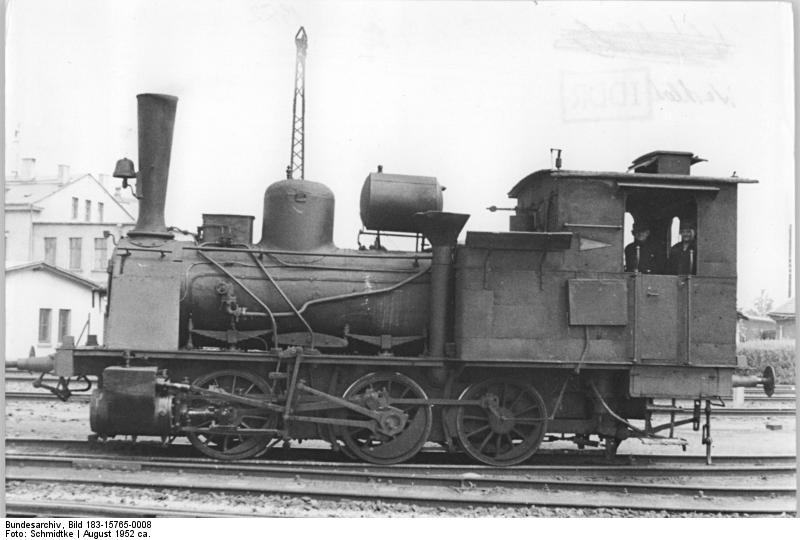
Locomotive of a similar type to T 3 on East German factory railways in the 1950s.

After World War II, the Deutsche Bundesbahn (DB) had 48 locomotives of the 89^{70-75} series in 1950. Some of the remaining locomotives were transferred to the railways of Deutsche Reichsbahn (DR) of East Germany, which also took over numerous locomotives of the same or similar type from nationalized private railways. On the railways of the GDR, the newly acquired locomotives were assigned numbers in the range 89 5901 to 6306 (series 89^{59-63}), with the prefix 59 to 63 depending on the axle load, ranging from 9 (20,000) to 13 t (29,000 lb). Several locomotives were adapted for operation with a trailing tender. Additionally, some locomotives continued to be used on industrial railways. The last were withdrawn from active service on public railways in West Germany in 1961, and in East Germany in 1967, after more than 60 years of operation. A relatively large number of locomotives of this series or similar types have been preserved as monuments or for museum purposes, some of which remain in operational condition.

=== DRG numbering ===
In 1925, the Deutsche Reichsbahn (DRG) renumbered 511 locomotives, of which 469 were type III-4e (numbers 89 7001 to 7456 and 89 7499 to 7511) and 42 were type III-4p (numbers 89 7457 to 7498). This series also included some locomotives not belonging to the Prussian T3 series, described further.

In incorporating locomotives later on from private railways that they had taken over, the DRG were not very logical. As a result, Class 89.75 ended up with a mixture of various locomotives types, in some cases with numbers that followed directly on from one another.

- The locomotives whose numbers immediately followed the Prussian T3s, those with numbers 89 7512–7521, were not T 3s, but an industrial locomotive (Class Pudel which translates as "poodle") built by Jung for the former Bremen Harbour Railway 10–19 that had been taken over by the DRG in 1930. These engines had a 15 t coupled axle load and were significantly heavier than the T 3. They had a Walschaerts valve gear and a small coal bunker behind the cab.
- The T 3s of the BLE, taken over in 1938 by the DRG, were given numbers 89 7531–7540. Locomotive 89 7535 was transferred that same year to the Gardelegen-Neuhaldensleben-Weferlingen railway.
- Locomotive 89 7541, which also came from the BLE, only resembled the T 3 in terms of its frame and running gear. The dimensions of cylinders, grate and heating areas were different.
- The three T 3s from the KOE, which was taken over by the DRG in 1941, were given numbers 89 7556, 89 7557 and 89 7559. No. 89 7558 was no T 3, but a somewhat more powerful class, the Bismarck class industrial locomotive built by Henschel.
- The T 3 from the ZFE, taken over in 1943, was retired at the same time. The locomotives with numbers 89 7560–89 7564 were from a different class, that had a 12 t coupled axle load, but were no more powerful than the T 3.

== Locomotives on Polish State Railways ==
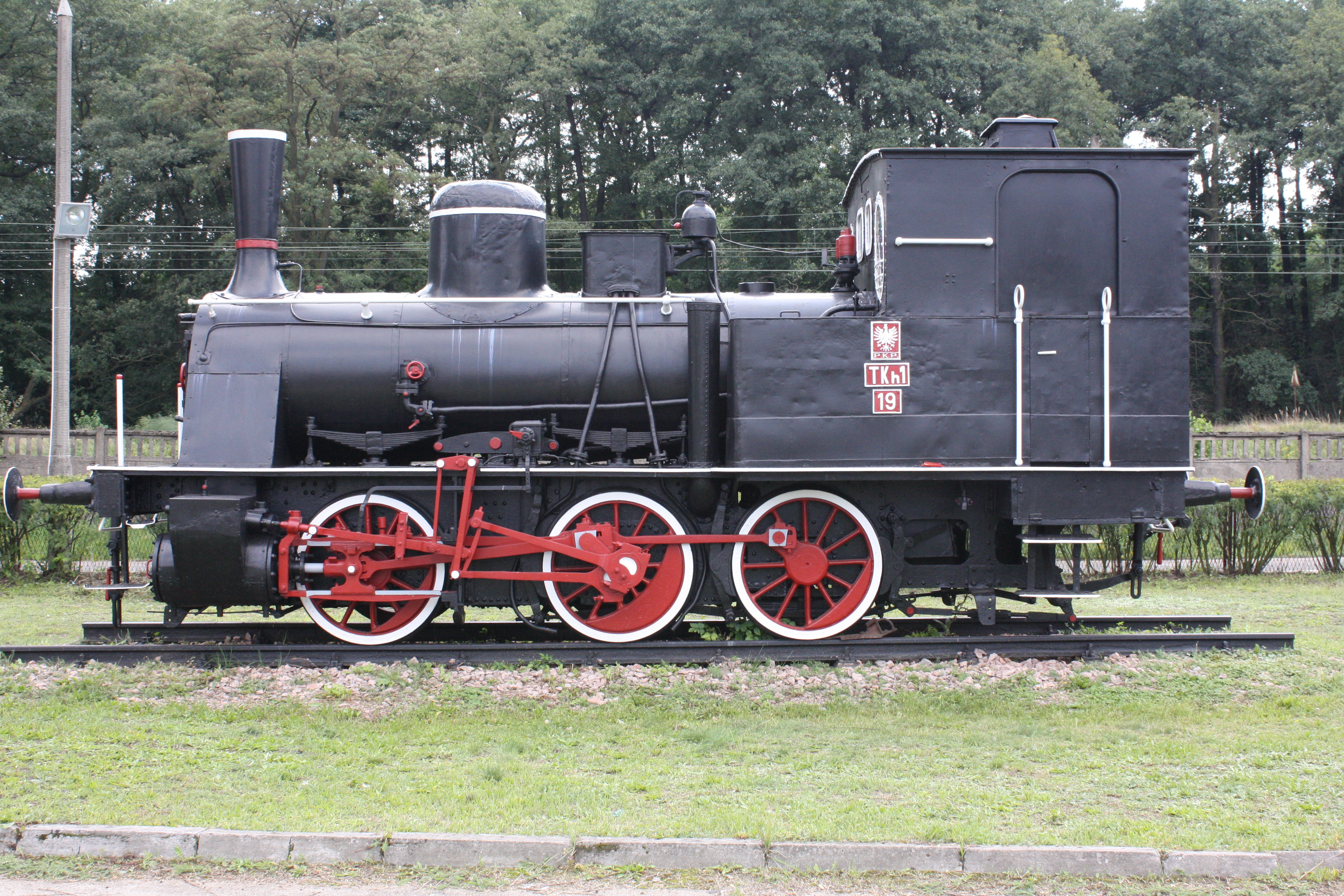
Preserved TKh1-19 locomotive of the Polish State Railways in Toruń Kluczyki

After 1918, the Polish State Railways (PKP) had up to 33 locomotives of this type, which were subsequently designated as PKP class TKh1 (according to another source, there were 22 locomotives in 1926). They were originally used primarily in the PKP directorates of Gdańsk and Vilnius. During World War II, these locomotives were seized by Germany or the USSR. In addition, T3 series locomotives or similar ones were used on industrial railways in Poland.

After 1945, 23 locomotives classified under the TKh1 class were acquired by PKP, receiving new numbers from TKh1-1 to TKh1-23. However, most of them originated from acquired private railways and comprised locomotives of various similar types. Among them, the TKh1-21 locomotive belonged to the reinforced Pudel type manufactured by Jung, from the former port railways in Bremen (DRG number 89 7520). They were mainly located at the Toruń locomotive depot. They were gradually withdrawn from use starting in the 1950s; the last ones were withdrawn in 1967. However, they continued to be used on industrial railways until the 1970s. Some locomotives of the same type were, after the war, classified under the collective TKh100 class.

23 locomotives of PKP were of 1,435 mm (4 ft 8 1/2 in) standard gauge and 26 locomotives were of 1,520 mm (4 ft 11 27/32 in) Russian gauge.

== Sources ==
- Obermayer, Horst J.; Weisbrod, Manfred (1998). Dampflok-Report. Bd. No. 6. Baureihen 80–96 (in German). Herman Merker Verlag. ISBN 3-89610-035-1.
- Rauter, Herbert (1991). Preußen-Report: Bd. 3. Naßdampf-Tenderlokomotiven T0-T7, T9, T11, T13, T15 (in German). Hermann Merker Verlag. ISBN 3-922404-19-7.
- Terczyński, Paweł (2003). Atlas parowozów (in Polish). Poznań: Poznań Klub Modelarzy Kolejowych. ISBN 83-901902-8-1. OCLC 917950022.
- Weisbrod, Manfred (1991). Dampflokomotiven deutscher Eisenbahnen, Von Privatbahnen zur DRG (EFA 1.5) (in German). Düsseldorf: Alba. pp. 15–18, 38–41, 90–92, 109–110. ISBN 3-87094-139-1.

== Film ==
- SWR: Eisenbahn-Romantik – T 3 im Angelbachtal (Folge 5)
- SWR: Eisenbahn-Romantik – T 3, kleine Loks auf großer Fahrt (Folge 199)
