= BLE No. 44 =

BLE 44 DRB 79 001 (2nd)
Type and origin
- Power type: Steam
- Builder: Krupp
- Serial number: 1423
- Build date: 1934
- Total produced: 1
Specifications
- Configuration
  - Whyte: 2-8-2T
  - UIC: 1′D1′ h2t
- Gauge: 1,435 mm (4 ft 8 1/2 in)
- Leading dia.: 900 mm (2 ft 11 3/8 in)
- Driver dia.: 1,350 mm (4 ft 5 1/8 in)
- Trailing dia.: 900 mm (2 ft 11 3/8 in)
- Wheelbase: 10,250 mm (33 ft 7 1/2 in)
  - Drivers: 1,650 mm (5 ft 5 in) × 3
  - Trailing: 2,650 mm (8 ft 8 1/4 in) both ends
- Length: 13,525 mm (44 ft 4 1/2 in) over buffers
- Height: 4,050 mm (13 ft 3 1/2 in)
- Axle load: 14.8 tonnes (14.6 long tons; 16.3 short tons)
- Adhesive weight: 59.1 tonnes (58.2 long tons; 65.1 short tons)
- Loco weight: 88.3 tonnes (86.9 long tons; 97.3 short tons)
- Fuel capacity: 4 tonnes (3.9 long tons; 4.4 short tons)
- Water cap.: 11,000 L (2,400 imp gal; 2,900 US gal)
- Firebox
  - Grate area: 2.375 m^{2} (25.56 sq ft)
- Boiler
  - Pitch: 4,675 mm (15 ft 4 in)
  - Tube plates: 4,700 mm (15 ft 5 in)
- Boiler pressure: 14 kg/cm^{2} (1.37 MPa; 199 psi)
- Heating surface
  - Firebox: 10.9 m^{2} (117 sq ft)
  - Tubes: 56.0 m^{2} (603 sq ft)
  - Flues: 48.0 m^{2} (517 sq ft)
- Superheater
  - Heating area: 49.5 m^{2} (533 sq ft)
- Cylinders: Two
- Cylinder size: 570 mm × 660 mm (22 7/16 in × 26 in)
Performance figures
- Maximum speed: 75 km/h (47 mph)
Career
- Operators: Brunswick State Railway; Deutsche Reichsbahn; Deutsche Eisenbahn-Gesellschaft (Braunschweig-Schöninger Eisenbahn / Frankfurt-Königsteiner Eisenbahn / Teutoburger Wald-Eisenbahn)
- Numbers: BLE: 44; DRB: 79 001 (2nd); DEG: 261
- Retired: March 1973

Locomotive No. 44 of the Brunswick State Railway Company (Braunschweigische Landes-Eisenbahn-Gesellschaft, BLE) was a tank locomotive for mixed passenger and goods traffic. The locomotive, built in 1934 by Krupp, had a 2-8-2T wheel arrangement and a two-cylinder superheated engine. Leading and trailing wheels were housed in a Bissel bogie. Rather unusual for such a locomotive were the smoke deflectors which were attached directly to the side tanks and extended as far as the front buffer beam.

After the takeover of the BLE by the Deutsche Reichsbahn in 1938, the engine was given the running number 79 001, re-using a number previously given to a Saxon XV HTV that had been retired in 1933.

The engine survived the Second World War and was sold to the Deutsche Eisenbahn-Gesellschaft (DEG), and sent to their Braunschweig-Schöninger Eisenbahn (BSE) in 1947. It was transferred to the Frankfurt-Königsteiner Eisenbahn (FKE) in 1949, the Teutoburger Wald-Eisenbahn (TWE) in 1960, and then returned to the FKE in 1966. It was retired there in 1973.

The running number 79 001 was allocated in 1951 to the former French locomotive, 1-242.TA.602, which had ended up in German hands after the war.

== See also ==
- List of DRG locomotives and railbuses
