= Stahlbahnwerke Freudenstein =

German railway company, 1891–1905

Stahlbahnwerke Freudenstein is a defunct German railway company.

== Company history ==
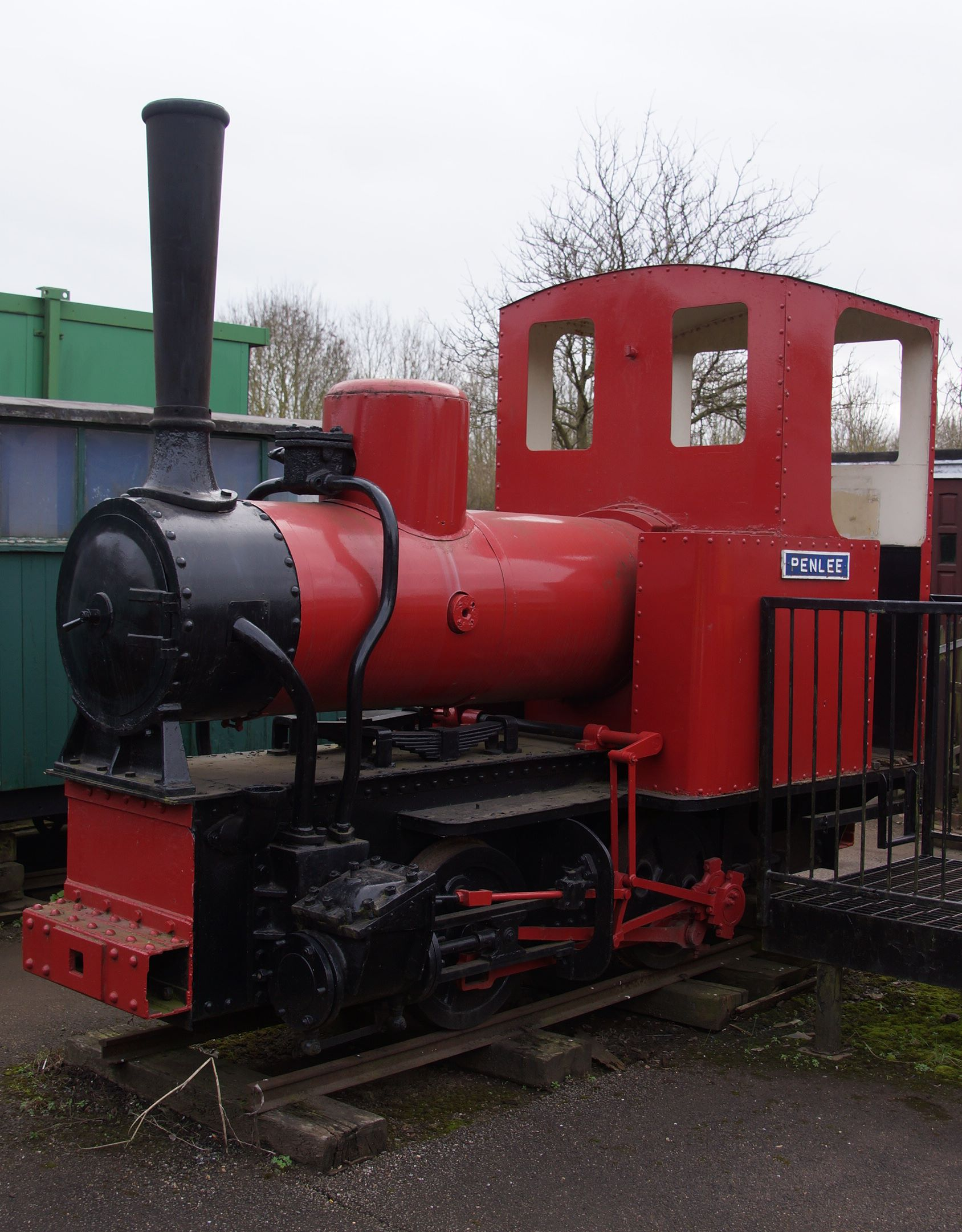
Locomotive 73 on display at Stonehenge Works, LBNGR

The company was founded in 1891 by the merchant Julius Freudenstein; until then, Freudenstein had worked for Orenstein & Koppel. Originally, the company traded in track and materials for railways.

In 1895, Freudenstein acquired a small manufacturing facility in Tempelhof, Berlin for the construction of its own locomotives. At the same time, the company became a limited company.

The production of the company's own locomotives was only a stopgap, that was without great success, even with an order for Prussian state railway supplies. In 1905, Freudenstein merged with Orenstein & Koppel. This led shortly afterward to liquidation and closure of Freudenstein's plant at Tempelhof.

== Production figures ==
The last definite works number is FNr.238, built in 1905.

It is currently not known the exact number of locomotives that were built by Freudenstein, but it is estimated to be approximately 250, 5 are known to be preserved:

Number/Name	Year built	Gauge	Notes
73 Berlin	1901	610	Built for Arthur Koppel, for use at Penlee Quarry. Now on Static display at Leighton Buzzard Narrow Gauge Railway
89	1902	1435	Transport rail & Museum Association, Aumühle. Originally supplied to Prussian state railway
138	1904	1000	Museo del Ferrocarril, Ponferrada
175	1904	508	Rail Transport Museum, Western Australia, Perth
217	1905	518	Bowylie Light Railway, NSW (Formerly ran at Bennett Brook Railway, WA 1989 - 1993)
