= Prussian T 8 =

Locomotive of the Prussian state railway

Prussian T 8; DR Baureihe 89.0, 89.10; DR-Baureihe 89.64, 65; PKP TKh3
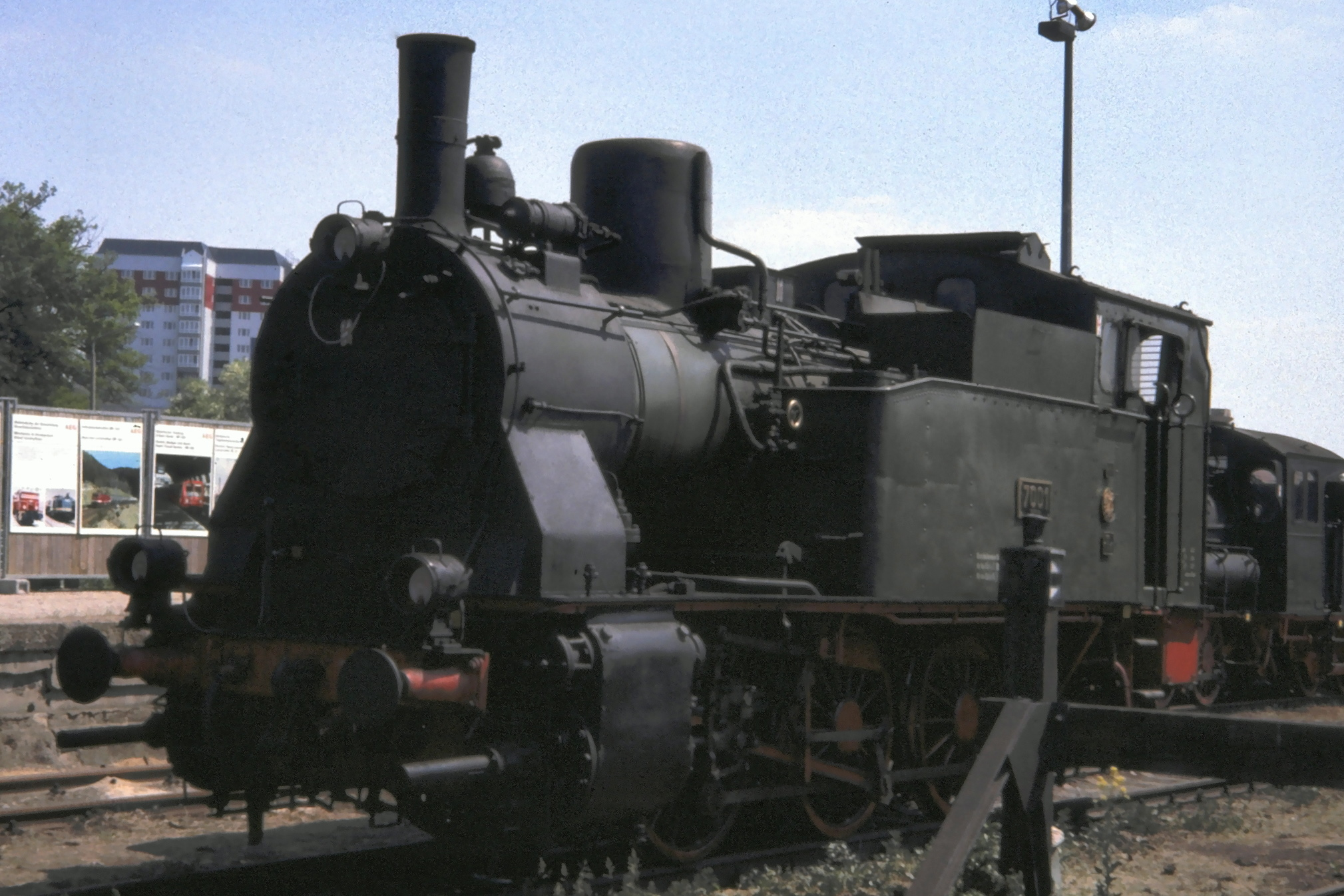
- preuß. T8 Berlin 7001 in Potsdam
Type and origin
- Builder: MBG Breslau; O&K; Hanomag
- Build date: 1906–1909
- Total produced: 100
Specifications
- Gauge: 1,435 mm (4 ft 8 1/2 in)
- Driver dia.: 1,350 mm (4 ft 5 1/8 in)
- Length
  - Over beams: 9,460 mm (31 ft 1/2 in)
- Axle load: 15.5 tonnes (15.3 long tons; 17.1 short tons)
- Adhesive weight: 45.6 t
- Service weight: 45.6 tonnes (44.9 long tons; 50.3 short tons)
- Boiler pressure: 12 bar (1.20 MPa; 174 psi)
- Heating surface
  - Firebox: 1.51 square metres (16.3 sq ft)
  - Evaporative: 68.50 m^{2} (737.3 sq ft)
- Superheater
  - Heating area: 17.90 square metres (192.7 sq ft)
- Cylinder size: 500 mm (19 11/16 in)
- Piston stroke: 600 mm (23 5/8 in)
- Loco brake: Hand brake, later compressed air brake
Performance figures
- Maximum speed: 60 km/h (37 mph)
- Indicated power: 210 kW (286 PS; 282 hp)
Career
- Numbers: DR 89 001–078; DR 89 1001–1004; DR 89 6476, 6576
- Retired: 1965
- Disposition: One preserved, remainder scrapped

The Prussian T 8 were six-coupled superheated goods tank locomotives of the Prussian state railways. They were originally intended for suburban passenger service in Berlin, and for use on branch lines. Due to their poor running qualities, they were demoted to shunting and short-distance goods train service.

Between 1906 and 1909, one hundred locomotives were built, of which 80 were still in service with Deutsche Reichsbahn in 1923, and 78 in 1925 when they were renumbered in class 89.0 as 89 001 to 078; but due to their poor performance, they were soon sold to private railways.

After World War I, ten locomotives were ceded to Poland, where they became PKP class TKh3.

In 1938, two locomotives were taken back into stock when Lokalbahn AG was nationalised; rather than restoring the locomotives' old numbers, they were allocated new ones: 89 1001 and 1002. The same thing happened in 1941 with the nationalisation of the Mecklenburg Friedrich-Wilhelm Railway (MFWE) (89 1003 and 1004). Two more were added to the Deutsche Reichsbahn (GDR) fleet in 1949 with the nationalisation of the Brandenburg State Railway (89 6476) and the Kreisbahn Schönermark–Damme (89 6576).

The last DR locomotive was retired in 1965; the last Deutsche Bundesbahn locomotive was a Werklok (works locomotive) which was retired in 1964.

== Preservation ==
One locomotive has been preserved at the DB Museum Halle (Saale): 89 1004, ex MFWE 4 (second), formerly 89 001.
