= Waggonfabrik Wismar =

Waggonfabrik Wismar was a manufacturer of railway vehicles from 1894 to 1947. The company was based in Wismar in the state of Mecklenburg-Western Pomerania in Germany.

== History ==
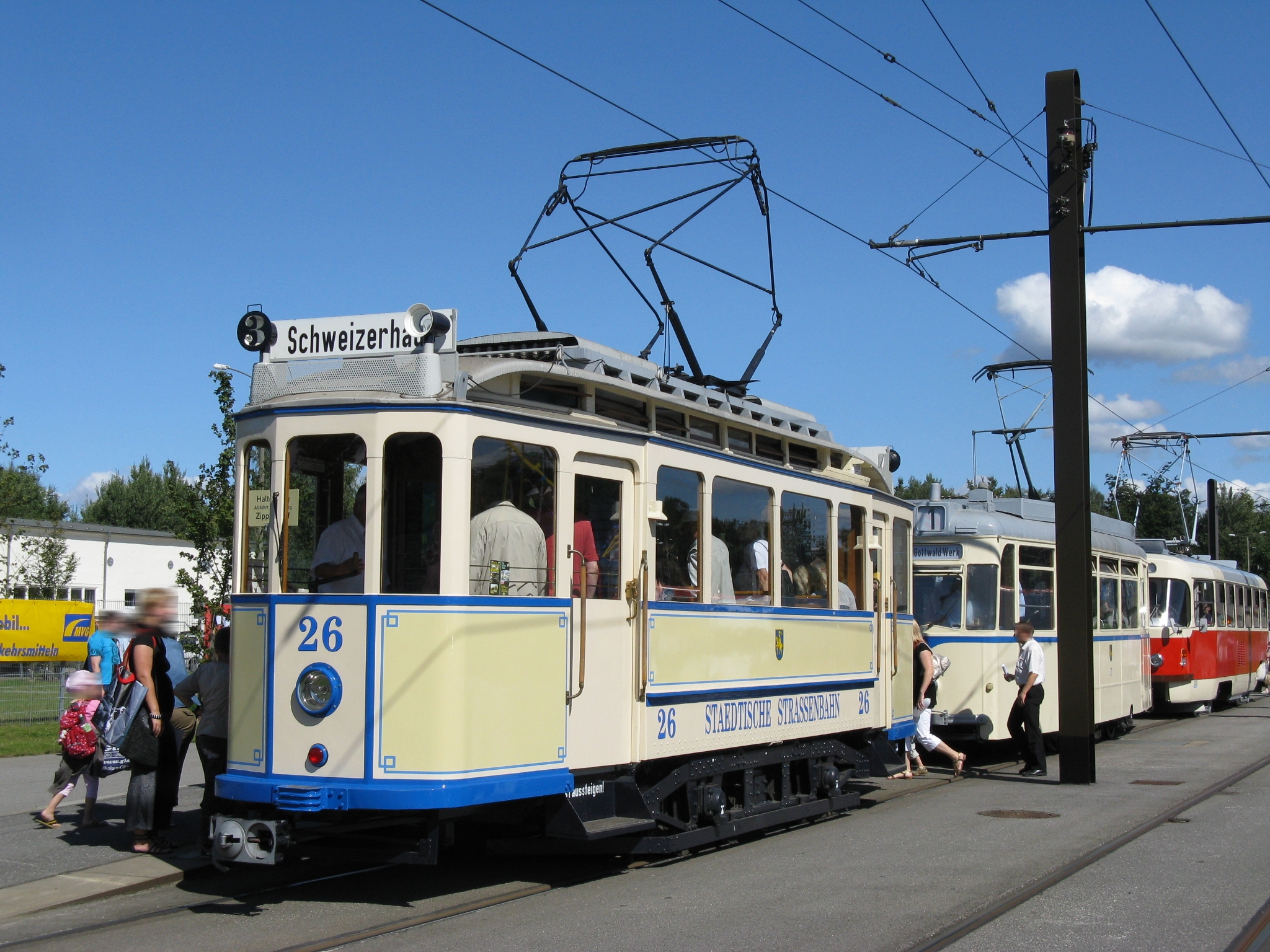
A 1926 tram in Schwerin

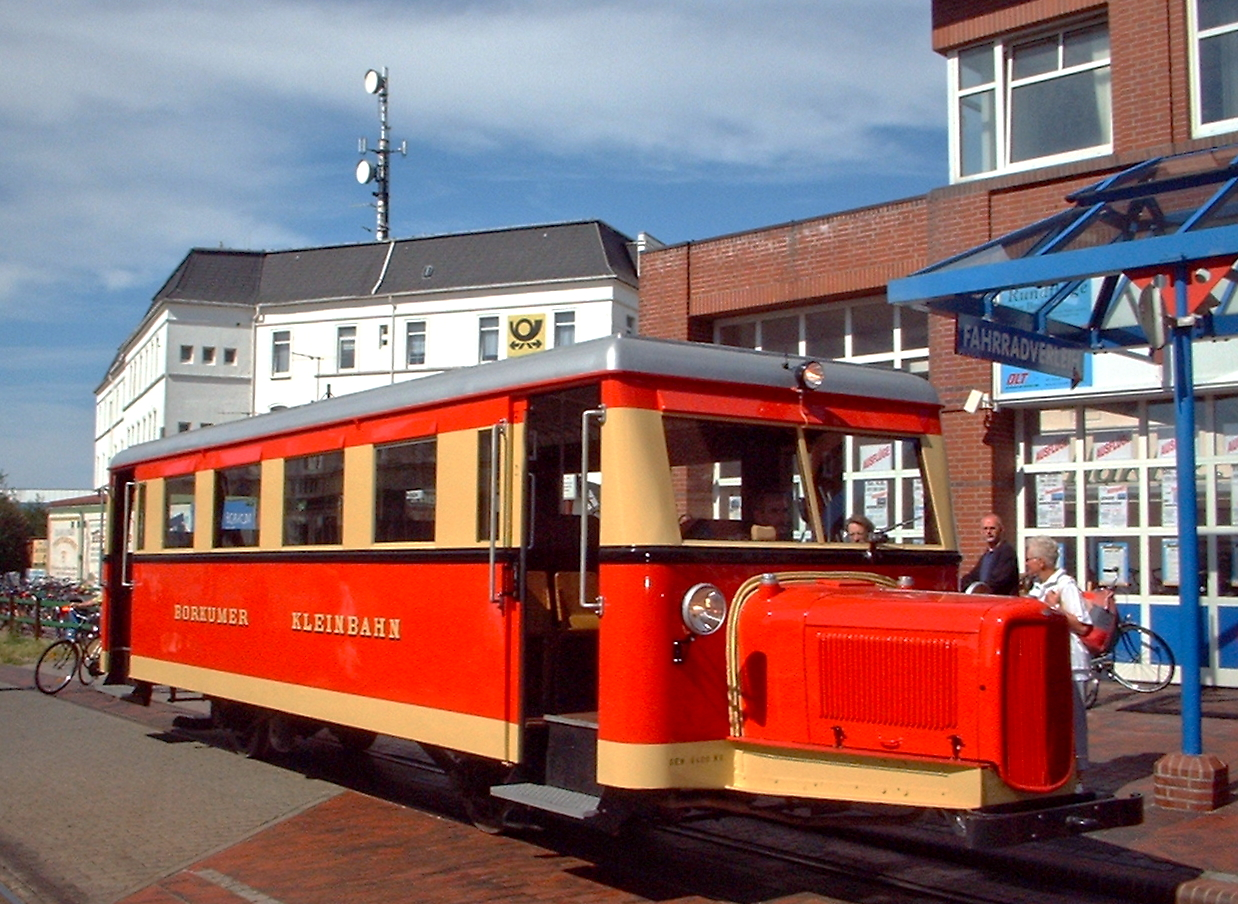
A 1940 Wismar railbus Type T1 of the Borkum Light Railway at Borkum station

Captain Heinrich Podeus of Wismar founded a coach factory in 1894. In 1902 it was moved to a site outside the town that was next to the F. Crull iron foundry and engineering works that already belonged to Podeus. The coach factory was then renamed as Wagenbau F. Crull & Co Wismar (F. Crull Coachbuilders & Co, Wismar). After its takeover by Podeus' sons in 1907 it became the Waggonfabrik Wismar GmbH (Wismar Coach Factory). The firm concentrated on the construction of special coaches; both sleeping and dining cars as well as insulated and refrigerated vans. In addition to railway vehicles it also manufactured chassis for lorries. In 1911 the GmbH became an Aktiengesellschaft. In 1917 the Deutsche Waggonleihanstalt AG (German Coach Hire Firm) took a majority shareholding and merged both companies into the Eisenbahn-Verkehrsmittel A.-G. (Railway Transport Co.) On 23 March 1936 the coach factory was spun off again as the Triebwagen- und Waggonfabrik Wismar Aktiengesellschaft (Wismar Railbus and Coach Factory).

In 1926 the firm had 1,600 employees; this rose to 1,930 workers in 1939.

At the 1924 Railway Exhibition at Seddin, the firm exhibited its first railbus. This had a diesel engine that was located not in the vehicle body, but in the bogie. It was also an entirely steel construction. The firm also pointed the way to the future through the introduction of electric welding that enable a much lighter construction.

The firm maintained good relations with the Lower Saxon State Railway Office (Niedersächsisches Landeseisenbahnamt) and produced the Wismar Railbus in cooperation with them. They also built a number of the Frankfurt variant.

After 1945 the construction of railbuses was concentrated in the Soviet Zone at Dessau. The facilities were given over to the Wismar ship repair firm, Schiffsreparaturwerk Wismar, and the firm was removed from the Trade Register in 1948. Until the early 1990s propellers were manufactured at the site for the diesel engine firm of Dieselmotorenwerke Rostock. Part of the factory facilities have now been demolished.

== Sources ==
- Christian Schröder, Insa Konukiewitz, Wolfram Bäumer: Der Wismarer Schienenbus der Bauart Hannover. In: Die Museums-Eisenbahn 1/2000, S. 17–19
