= Wismar railbus =

Wismar Railbus, Hannover version
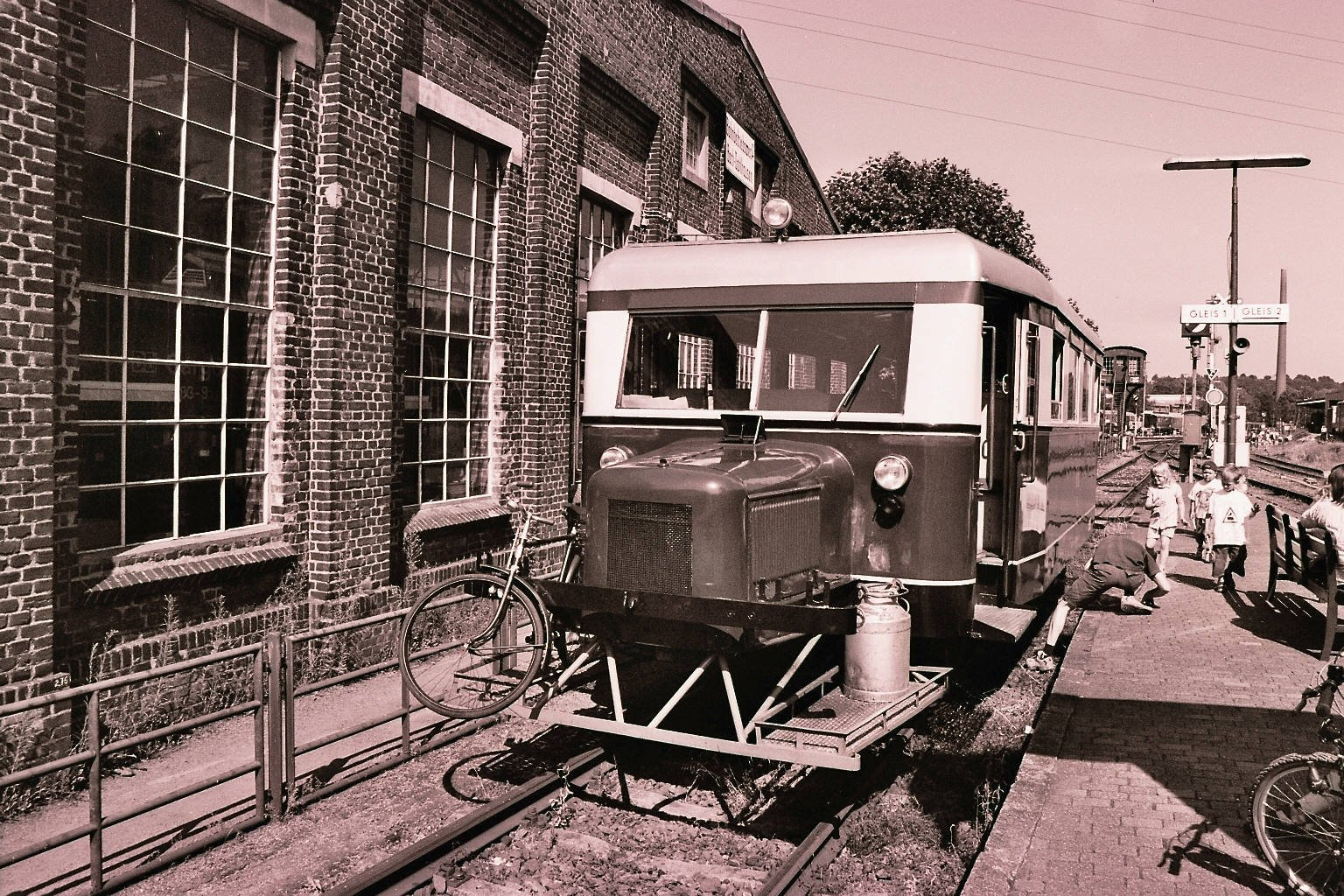
- Wismar railbus belonging to the DGEG
- Constructed: 1932–1941
- Number built: 57
- Fleet numbers: DRG 133 009-012; DRG 135 077-080; DB VT 89 900-901

Specifications
- Car length: 10,100 mm (33 ft 1 5/8 in) over
- Maximum speed: 56 km/h (35 mph) *
- Weight: 6.1 t (6.0 long tons; 6.7 short tons) (empty)
- Prime mover(s): Ford AA, Ford BB
- Power output: 29 or 37 kW (39 or 50 PS; 39 or 50 hp)
- Transmission: Mechanical
- UIC classification: A1
- Braking system(s): Drum brake, Hand brake
- Track gauge: 750 mm (2 ft 5 1/2 in) or; 900 mm (2 ft 11 7/16 in) or; 1,000 mm (3 ft 3 3/8 in) metre gauge or; 1,435 mm (4 ft 8 1/2 in) standard gauge

Notes/references
- * refers to the VT 133 009/010.

The 'Hanover version' of the Wismar railbus (Wismarer Schienenbus) was developed in the early 1930s as a light railbus for economical passenger services on branch lines in Germany.

== History ==
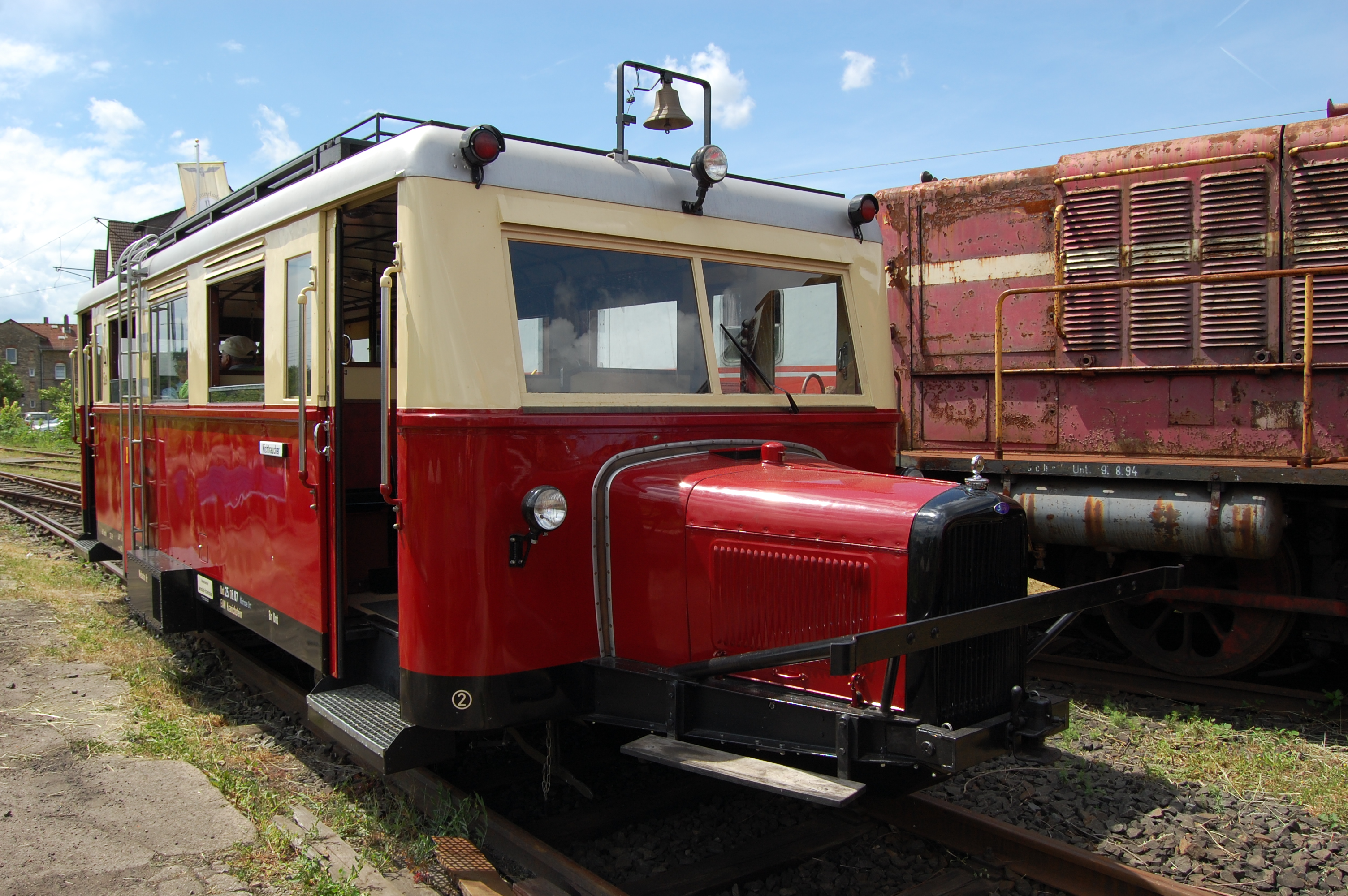
T 141 (1st batch) in Darmstadt-Kranichstein

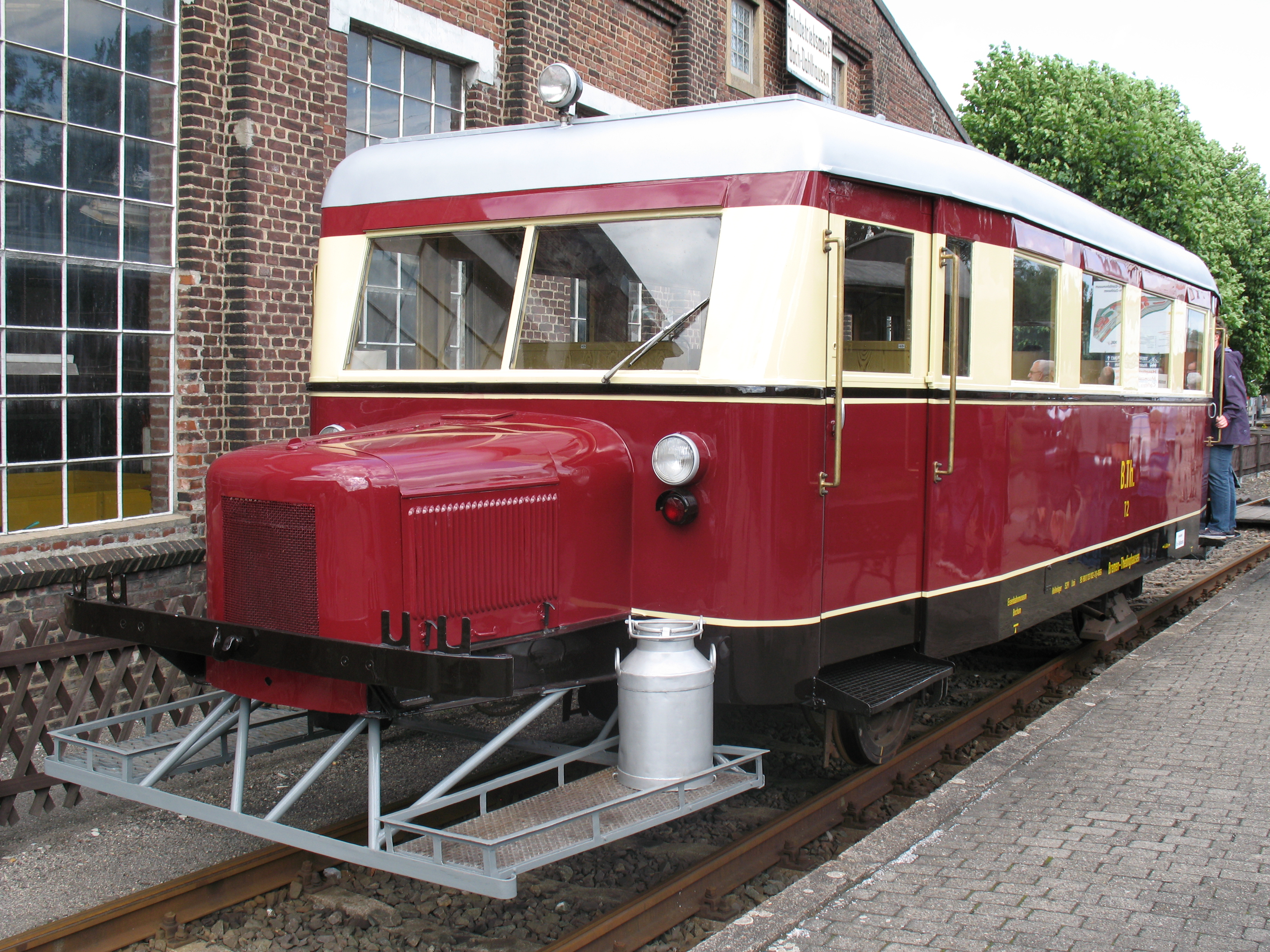
Wismar railbus at Bochum Dahlhausen Railway Museum

As early as the 1920s, light branch lines (the so-called Kleinbahnen) were looking for ways to operate lightly used routes as cheaply as possible. The overwhelmingly employed mixed trains were very slow because of the time needed for shunting wagons. In addition, only a few trains ran each day. In order to offer faster and more frequent services, railbuses were procured. Because they tended to be one-offs and the technology was not always fully mature, they were often expensive. So attempts were made to use the experience and components from the manufacture of buses. Experiments with converted buses were not successful as their engines were not powerful enough and, moreover, they were not designed for push-pull operations.

In 1932 the Triebwagen- und Waggonfabrik Wismar AG (Wismar Railcar and Coach Company) built a light, twin-axled railbus, that could be made cheaply because it used numerous components from the manufacture of road vehicles. For example, 40 horsepower Ford petrol engines were installed, together with their drives. The use of road vehicle drives with five forward gears and one reverse gear made the installation of two engines necessary. These were located outside the vehicle body and gave the railbus an unmistakable appearance.

The Wismar railbus was very much of interest to both Kleinbahnen and private railways due to its low costs. In 1932 a prototype was delivered for the Lüneburg–Soltau Light Railway (Kleinbahn). It was so successful that the Hanover State Kleinbahn Office (Landeskleinbahnamt Hannover) ordered a batch of nine vehicles for a number of Kleinbahnen.

The Wismar railbus had several advantages. Firstly, it was cheap: at 25,000 Reichsmarks, roughly half the cost of a normal railcar. Secondly, it was easy to maintain - the engines were very accessible and spare parts could be obtained from any Ford dealer - and, thirdly, it was relatively comfortable because, although it only offered 3rd class accommodation, the seats were upholstered.

In 1936 the Wismar coach factory offered 5 different variants:

| | Type A | Type B | Type C | Type D | Type E |
|---|---|---|---|---|---|
| Gauge (mm) | 1,435 | 1,435 | 1,435 | 1,000 | 1,000 |
| Wheelbase (mm) | 4,400 | 4,000 | 3,500 | 4,000 | 3,500 |
| Length (mm) | 11,610 | 10,100 | 10,100 | 11,150 | 10,100 |
| Width (mm) | 2,902 | 2,902 | 2,902 | 2,430 | 2,430 |
| Weight (kg) | 6,600 | 6,200 | 6,600 | 6,200 | 5,800 |
| Seats | 40+16 | 30+16 | 26+14 | 22+13 | 24+14 |
| Remarks | | | Toilet; Charcoal gas | Toilet; Luggage compartment | |

In practice, however, very few vehicles were delivered exactly in accordance with their basic specification. Generally vehicles were manufactured to the requirements of the customer and about a third could not really be grouped easily into one of the basic classes.

Up to 1941 59 units of these vehicles were produced and delivered to various railway companies at home and abroad in different rail gauges. In 1935 the Deutsche Reichsbahn took over four railbuses from the Saar railways, that were numbered 133 009 to 133 012, four, more powerful, railbuses with a longer wheelbase were given numbers 135 077 to 080. Although several of these wagons were destroyed during the Second World War or were left abroad after the war had ended, four of these railbuses subsequently joined the Deutsche Bundesbahn fleet, where they were allocated numbers VT 88 900 to 902 (long wheelbase) and VT 89 900 (short wheelbase).

Following the nationalisation of private railways in the GDR, several examples also ended up in the East German Deutsche Reichsbahn, who allocated them the numbers VT 133 505–510, 513–515 (1,435 mm (4 ft 8 1/2 in)) and 524–525 (750 mm (2 ft 5 1/2 in)). Railbuses VT 133 513–514 which were remotored in the early 1960s with 47 horsepower (35 kW) Phänomen Garant lorry diesel engines were renumbered at first to VT 135 501–502.

Due to the long engine bonnets at each end of the railbus that housed the motors for driving in either direction, this railbus was nicknamed the 'Pig's Snout' (Schweineschnäuzchen). The vehicles proved to be a real saviour for the Kleinbahnen, because the high costs of the generally loss-making passenger services on north German light branch lines were able to be considerably reduced. Often the Hanover versions of the railbus replaced trains that only consisted of a loco and one or very few coaches, which were therefore very expensive to operate. But it only needed six paying passengers for the railbus to make a profit.

A total of 25 railbuses and 3 trailer cars were also delivered to private railways in Spain between 1933 and 1937. Of the vehicles taken over by the Red Nacional de los Ferrocarriles Españoles (RENFE) after the nationalisation of the railways in Spain, four railbuses were rebuilt and fitted with more powerful engines. Others were rebuilt into unmotorised luggage vans. All the railbuses in Spain were retired at the end of the 1960s.

== Design ==
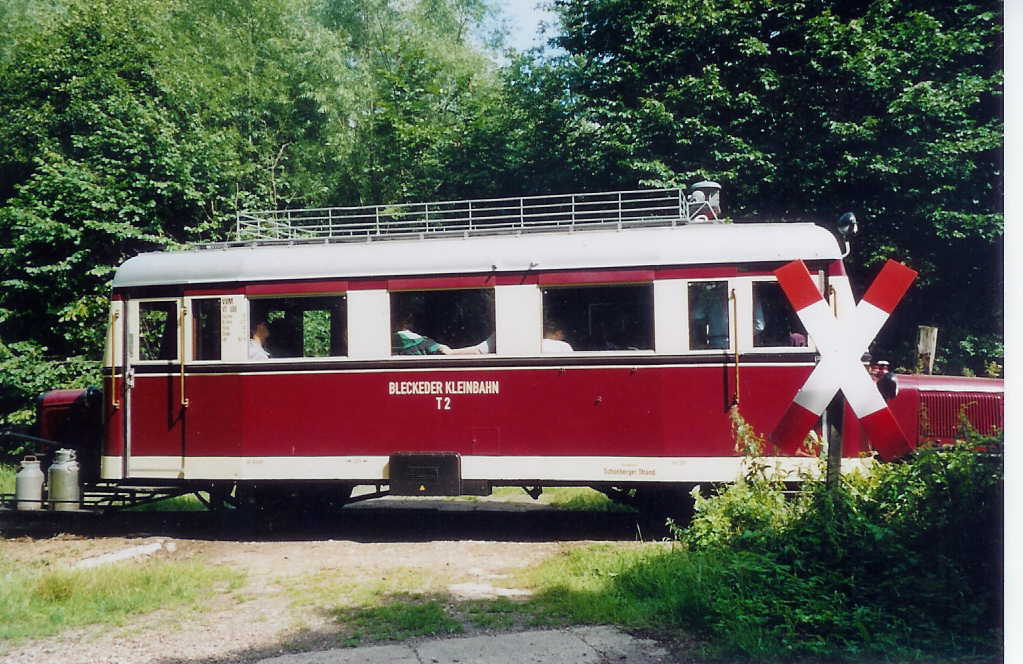
T2 of the Bleckede Kreisbahn (Type C) on the Schönberg–Schönberger Strand museum railway

The wagon body rested on a frame consisting of two lattice girders that converged at the front and rear. The girders had holes in them to save weight. The entire construction was welded, which meant that the Wismar railbus was the first fully welded railway vehicle in Germany. Its profiles were creased and the suspension springs were mounted on rubber sections. The entire railbus weighed just 6 tonnes.

One feature of this vehicle were the rubber-sprung wheelsets, with rubber elements being inserted between the tyre and the wheel body. So this design feature, which was used on the Intercity-Express, is not actually a modern discovery. However, as a result of the short wheelbase of only 3.5 m to 4 m the vehicle tended to hunt slightly.

The prototype had revolving doors, but most of the production models had 740 mm wide sliding doors.

At each end there was an identical motor installation with Ford petrol engines, that drove the first axle via a four-geared drive and cardan shaft. Only the front motor facing the direction of travel was used and was operated by the driver's cab at that end. When shunting or if an engine failed, the railbus could also be driven in reverse.

Students from the Bauhaus school, the famous German design school, helped with the interiors. That can be seen from the clear shapes and the design of the upholstery. The walls were clad with plywood and the floor covered with linoleum. The seats were upholstered and the windows could be partly wound down. The driver's seat, at the end which was not in use, was folded up so that the entrance remained clear. Heating was initially provided by a fresh air heater using the warmth of the engine; later Webasto heaters were installed as well. The interior was electrically lit.

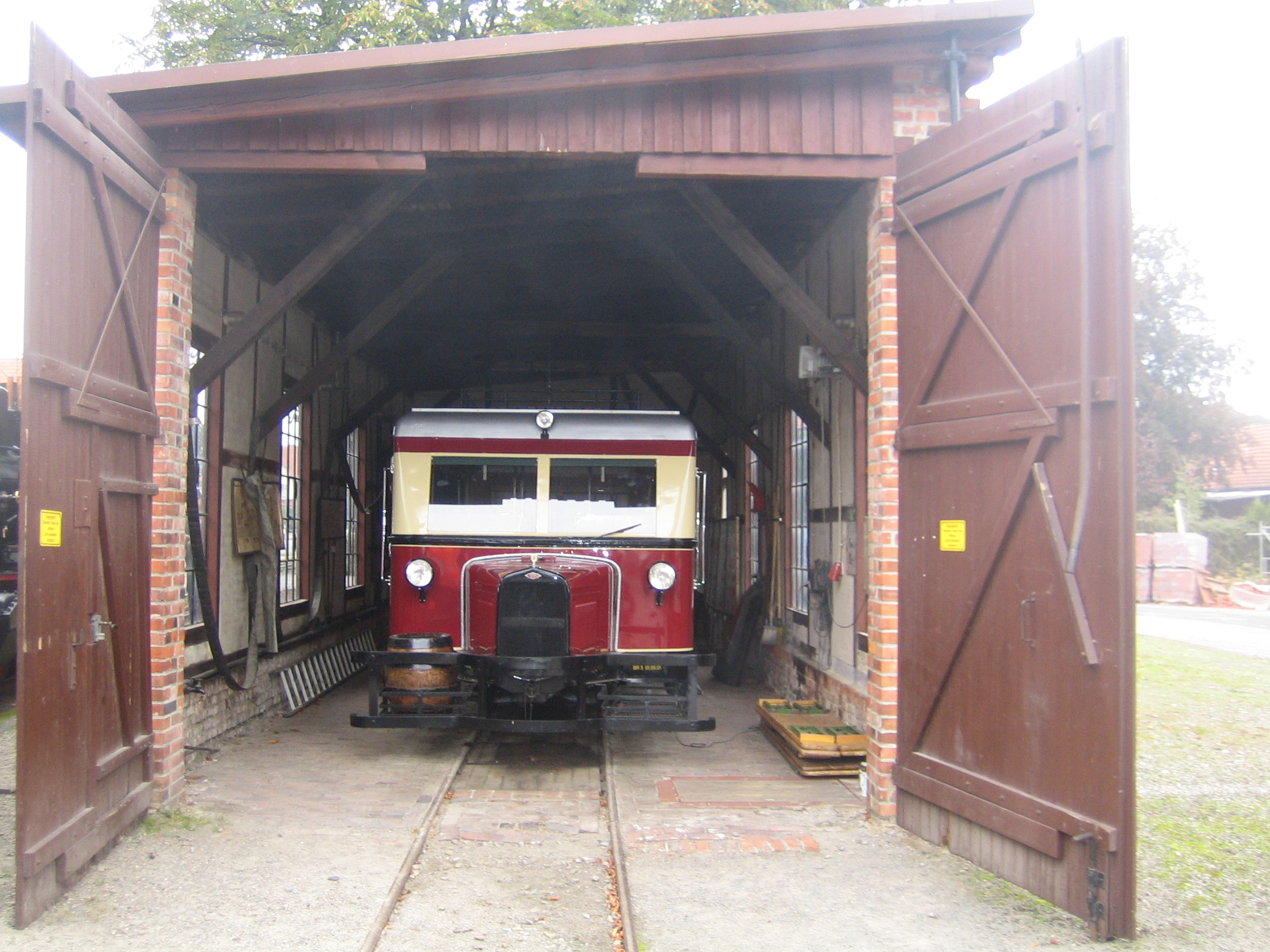
T 41 (1st series) in the DEV shed in Asendorf

To begin with, Ford AA motors (the lorry version of the Ford Model A) were used, but in 1935 more powerful Ford BB motors were installed, enabling the top speed to be increased from 50 km/h to 60 km/h. These railbuses may be recognised by the vertical grills on the radiators.

Only two examples of the wood-fired version were built. They had a wood burner installed inside the wagon, replacing a group of seats. These are distinguishable by the missing window.

Later various motors were installed in the rebuilds, the Deutsche Reichsbahn in the GDR using Robur Typ 4 KVD 12,5 SLR engines.

In order to be able to carry large items of luggage and goods, many railbuses were fitted with roof racks, which were also common on buses. The space next to the bonnets was also often used to attach wire mesh baskets or bicycle racks.

Another new feature was the livery, with a red coach body and beige window strips. Even various passenger and luggage trailers were offered, but only the Fliegerkommandantur List had one of these trailers delivered from Waggonfabrik Wismar.

Some of the railbuses for the Saar railways were quite different from the standard models. After procuring two of the standard railbuses, two more were ordered with wider doors and benches running fore-and-aft, and a further four railbuses with 6 m wheelbase and diesel motors with common Mylius drives, that enabled the vehicle to be driven with both engines simultaneously and both axles to be driven. In addition they had 50 horsepower (37 kW) diesel motors by Humboldt-Deutz.

== Preserved ==
At least 10 examples have been preserved.

=== Standard gauge ===
Those of standard gauge include vehicles belonging to the:

- Bochum-Dahlhausen Railway Museum (Bremen-Thedinghausen line, T2)
- Verein Verkehrsamateure und Museumsbahn (Osthannoversche Eisenbahnen VT 0509)
- Darmstadt-Kranichstein Railway Museum (Lüchow-Schmarsau line, T 141)
- Museums-Eisenbahn Minden (Wilstedt-Zeven-Tostedt line, T145)
- Museum Buurtspoorweg Boekelo–Haaksbergen (Delmenhorst-Harpstedt line, T 148)
- Osthannoversche Eisenbahnen (OHE) (VT 0508).

=== Narrow gauge ===
Narrow gauge examples include vehicles owned by the:

- Deutscher Eisenbahn-Verein (German Railway Society) in Bruchhausen-Vilsen (Steinhude Lake railway, T 41, 1,000 mm (3 ft 3 3/8 in))
- Borkum branch line (T 1, 900 mm), still in regular service.

The former DB-VT 89 900 (ex DRG VT 133 010, ex Saarbahn 72) is at present (2008) being restored by railway enthusiasts in Wismar.

== Literature ==
- Bohlmann, Dieter-Theodor. Die Wismarer Schienenomnibusse der Bauart Hannover, Zeunert, Gifhorn, 2001 (Reprint), ISBN 3-924335-27-3
- Löttgers, Rolf. Schienenbusse in Deutschland. Die Serienwagen von Henschel, Wismar, Uerdingen und MAN, Franckh, Stuttgart, 1982, ISBN 3-440-05044-0
- Davies, W J K (July 2011). "Wismar Railbus". Continental Modeller. Beer: Peco Publications. ISSN 0955-1298.
