= Deutscher Eisenbahn-Verein =

Bruchhausen-Vilsen–Asendorf Museum Railway

Service
- Route number: 12383

Technical
- Line length: 7.8 km (4.8 mi)
- Track gauge: 1,000 mm (3 ft 3 3/8 in)
- Operating speed: 20 max.

The Deutscher Eisenbahn-Verein (German Railway Society) or DEV was founded in November 1964 as the Deutscher Kleinbahn-Verein (German Kleinbahn Society). Its purpose was the preservation of a working branch line with all its installations as a living open-air museum. The term Kleinbahn was primarily a Prussian concept that referred to light branch lines with lower traffic demands and of more lightweight construction than main lines or normal branch lines, hence the Kleinbahnen were mainly found in northern Germany.

== History ==
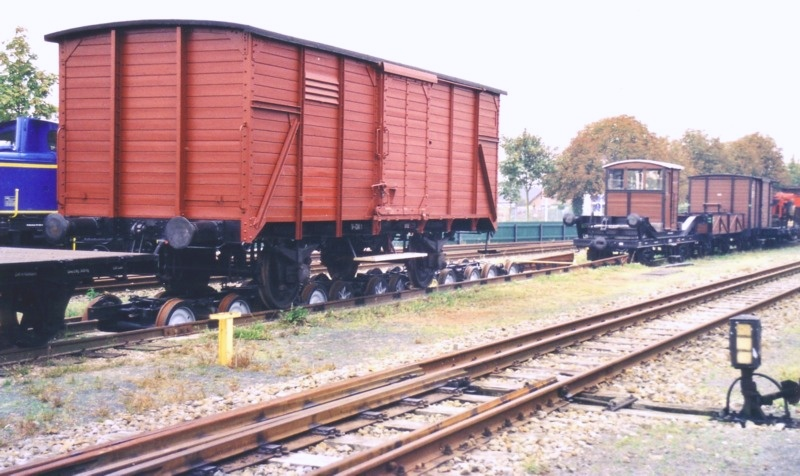
Rollbock pit at Bruchhausen-Vilsen

On 2 July 1966, museum railway services began on the narrow gauge section of line from Bruchhausen-Vilsen to Heiligenberg operated by the Verkehrsbetriebe Grafschaft Hoya, about 35 km south of Bremen, using the steam locomotive Bruchhausen and one coach. Setting aside a number of short-lived trials, this was the first museum railway in Germany.

Since then the Lower Saxony Kleinbahn Museum (Niedersächsisches Kleinbahn-Museum) has emerged. At weekends from May to September and in December, regular services are run on the Bruchhausen-Vilsen–Asendorf route - predominantly with steam trains. Under the name Hoyaer Eisenbahn, a connecting service is operated on the Eystrup–Hoya–Bruchhausen-Vilsen–Syke route. In Bruchhausen-Vilsen station, standard gauge vehicles may be transferred to the narrow gauge section by means of rollbocks (Rollböcken) or transporter wagons (Rollwagen).

== Vehicles ==
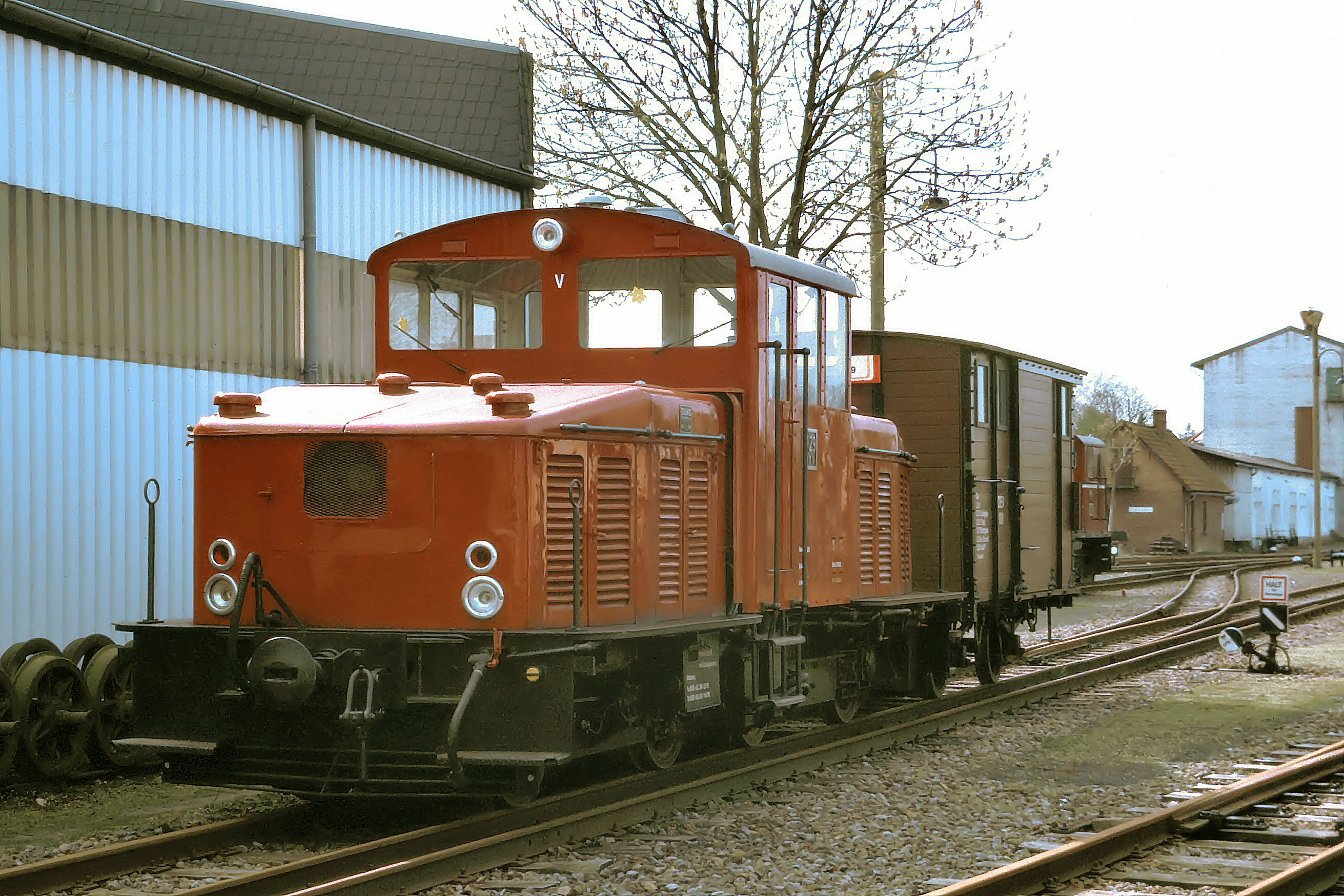
V 29 at Bruchhausen-Vilsen

There were more than 90 vehicles in the museum's collection in 2006, both standard gauge and metre gauge, built between 1892 and 1957, the vast majority of which were operational.

Amongst them were seven steam locomotives (including the former DR 99 5633 and a Lenz-Typ i), five diesel locomotives (including the former DB Class V 29), six railbuses (including a Wismar railbus, a Wismar (Frankfurt version) and one from the Franzburger Kreisbahn), 28 passenger coaches, six luggage and mail vans and numerous goods wagons and works vehicles. The society even has some standard gauge vehicles.

== Gallery ==
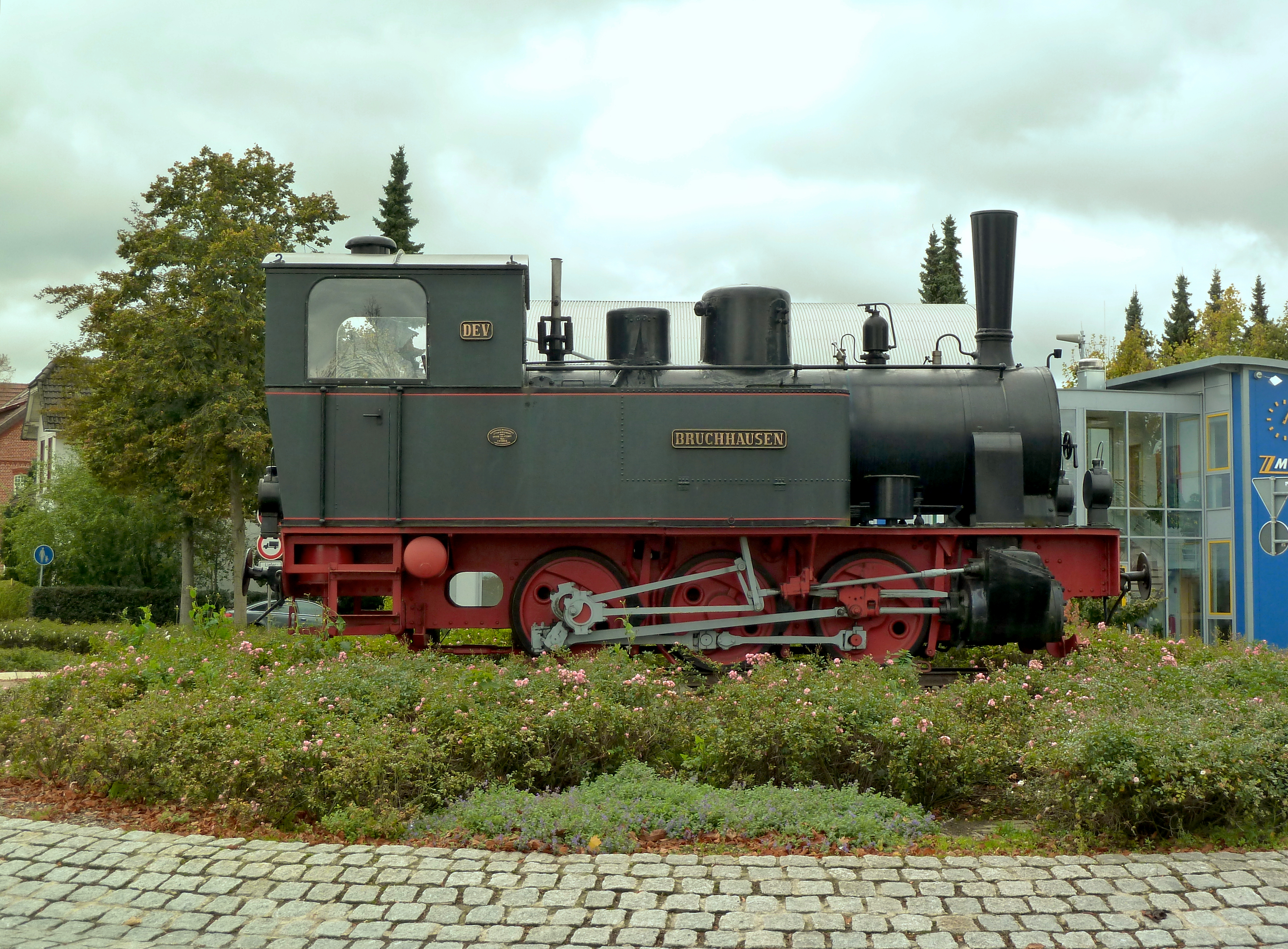
Locomotive Bruchhausen, identical to Hoya

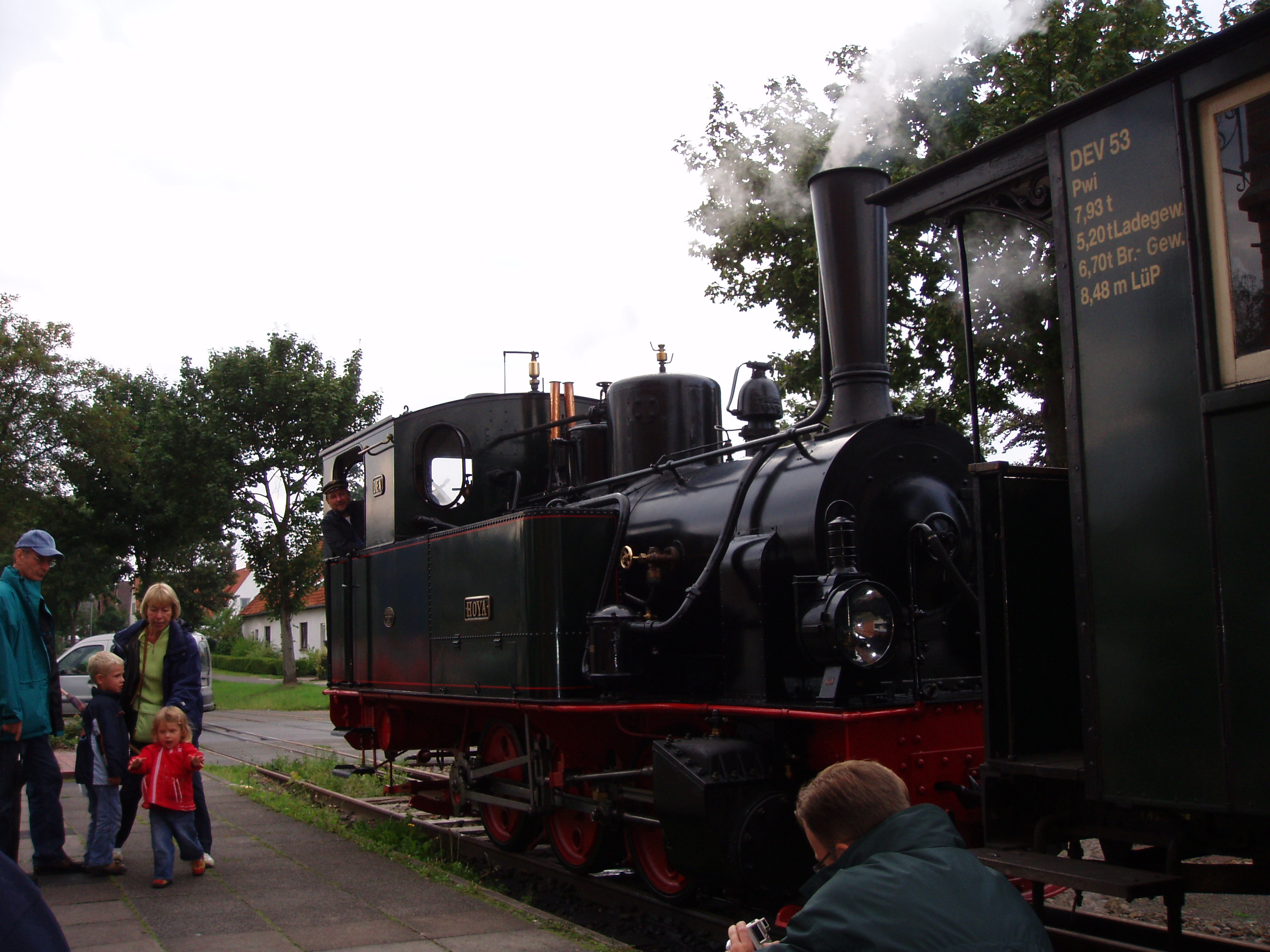
Hoya at Bruchhausen-Vilsen station with goods wagon 53

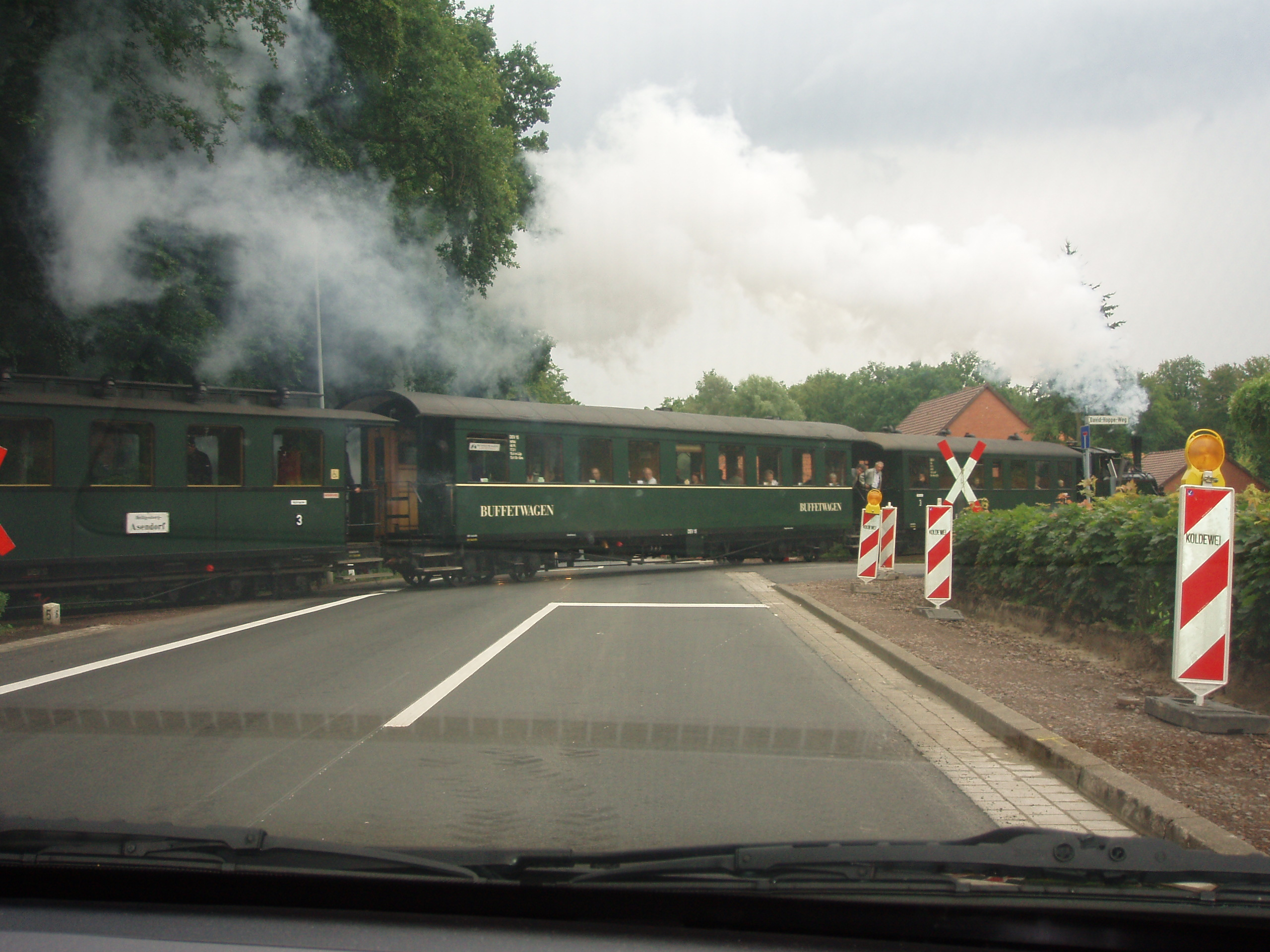
Train with buffet car

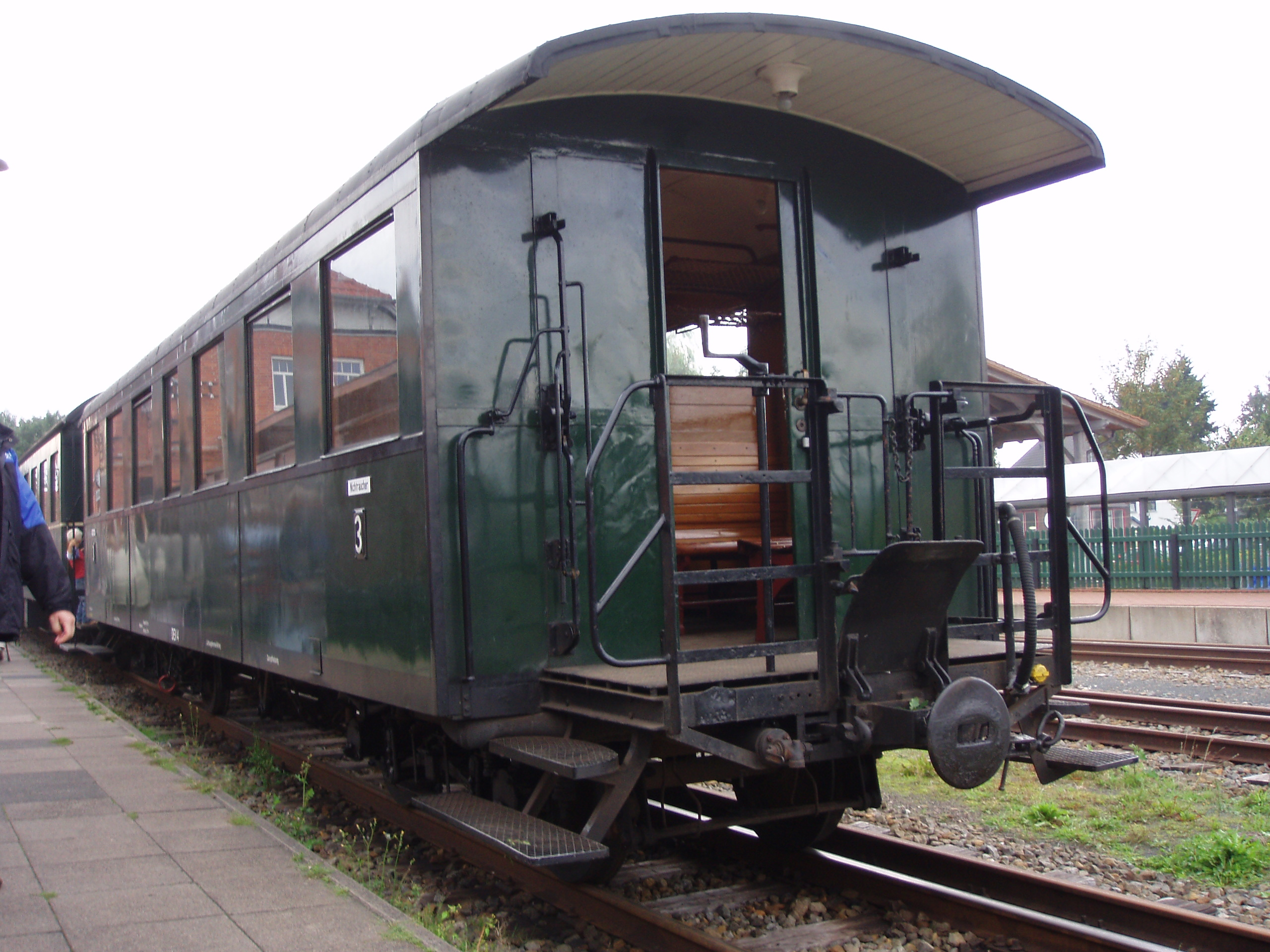
Coach 4

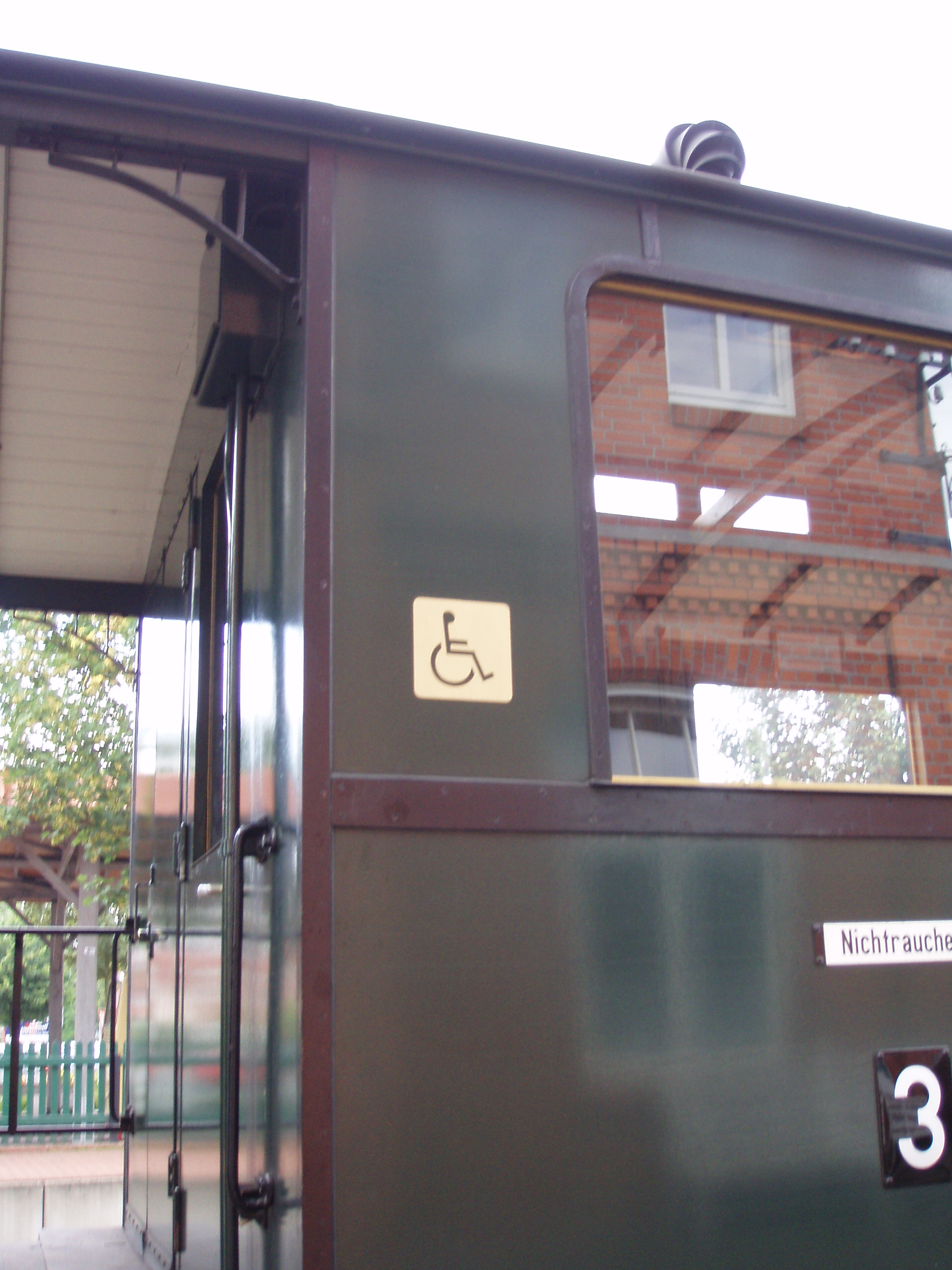
Coach 17: detail

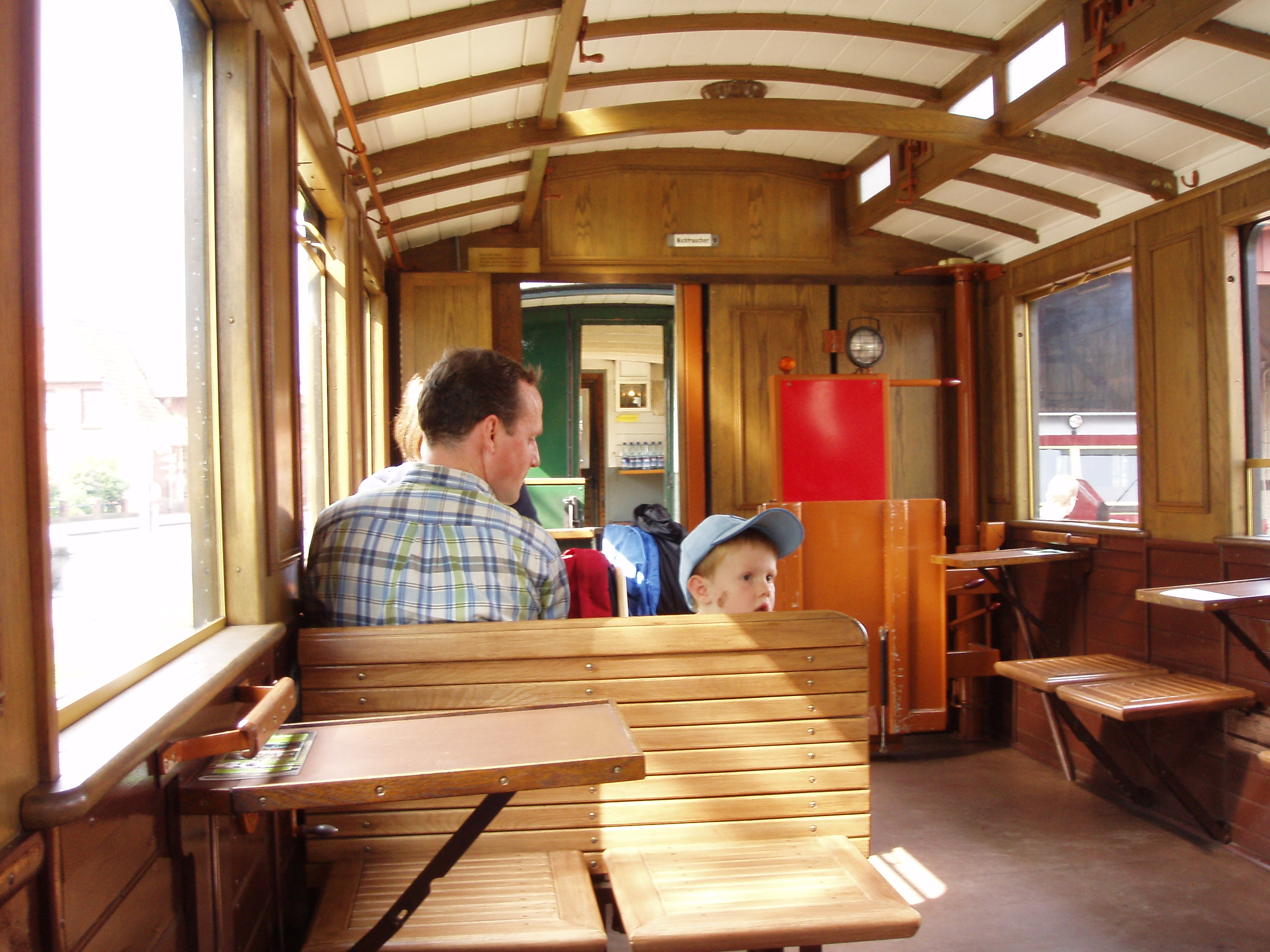
Inside coach 17

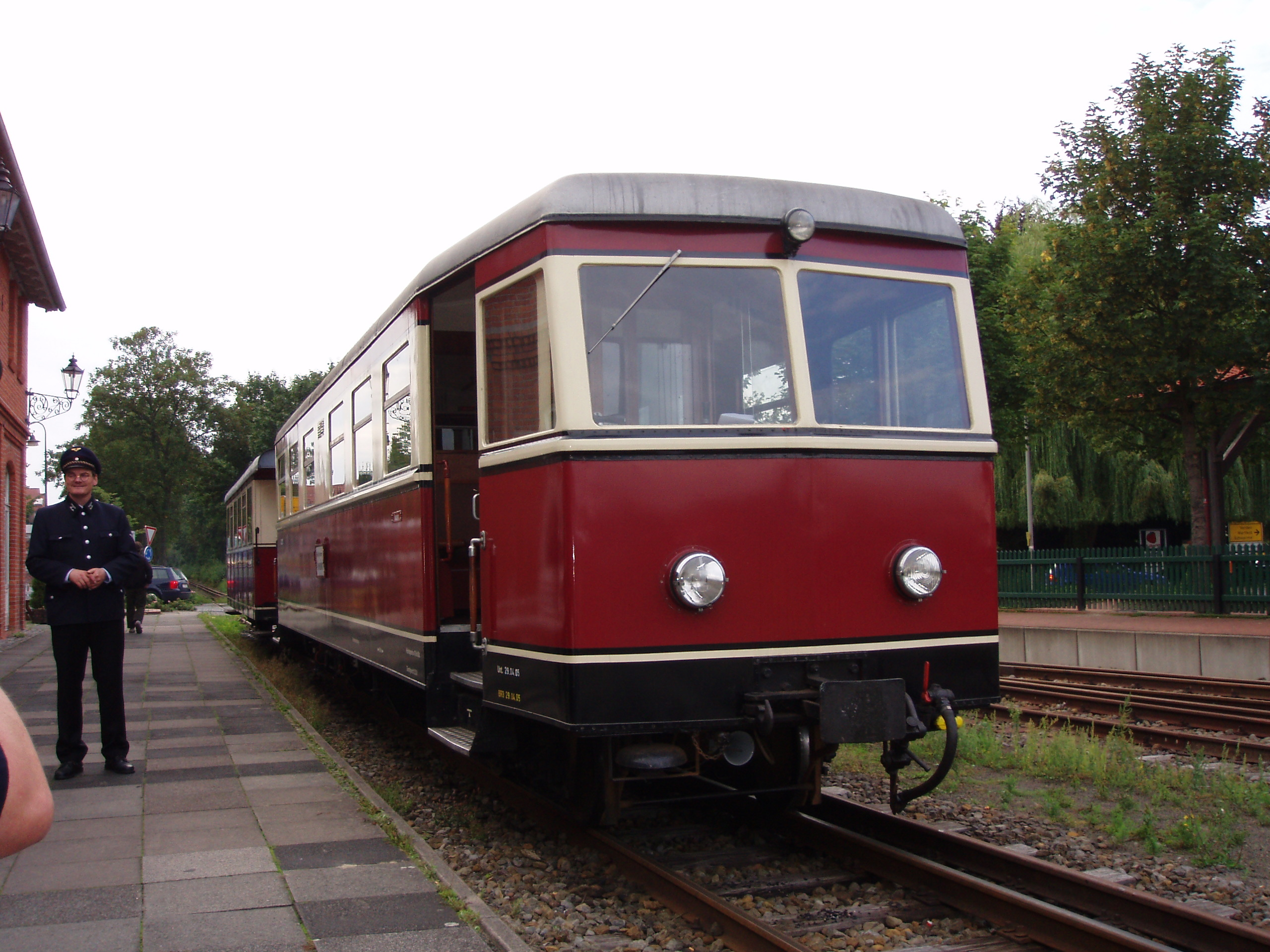
Railbus T44 with wagon 2 at Bruchhausen-Vilsen

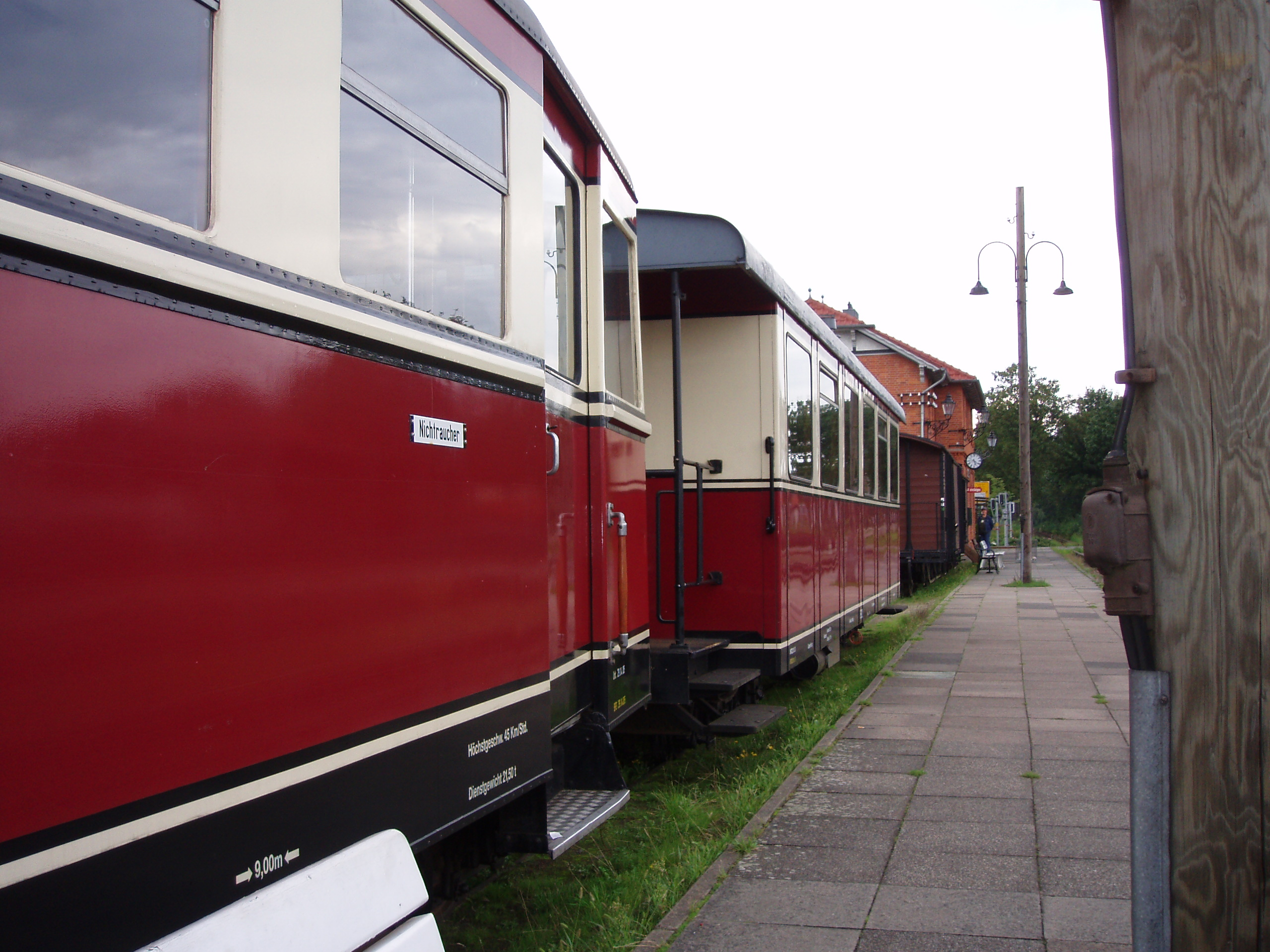
Multiple-unit train, wagon 2 in the centre

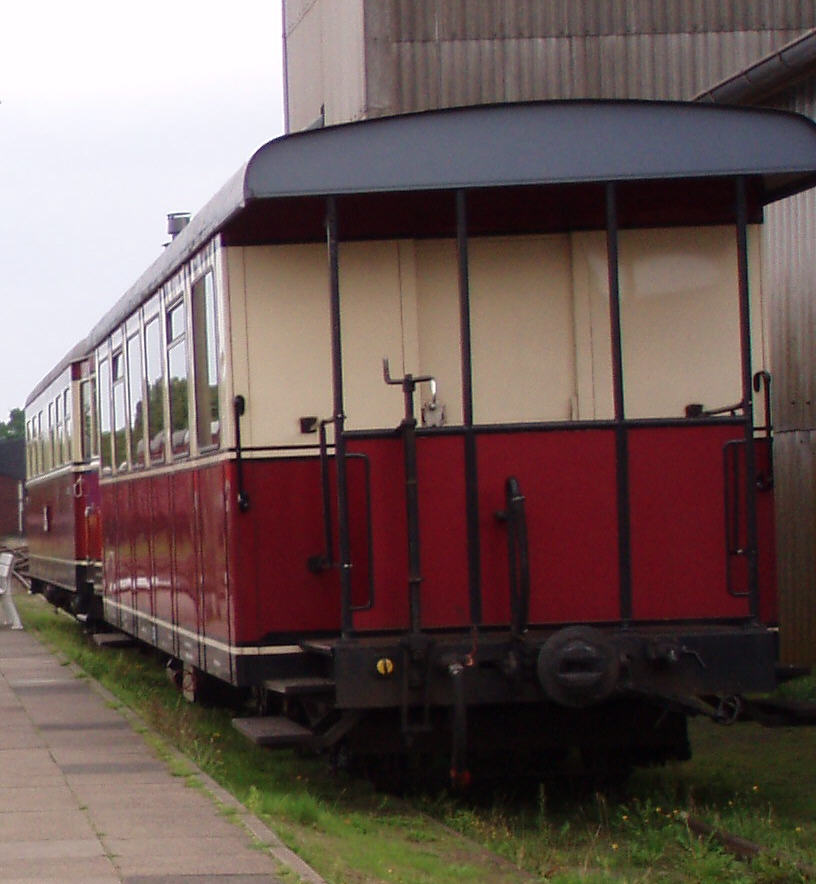
Multiple-unit train

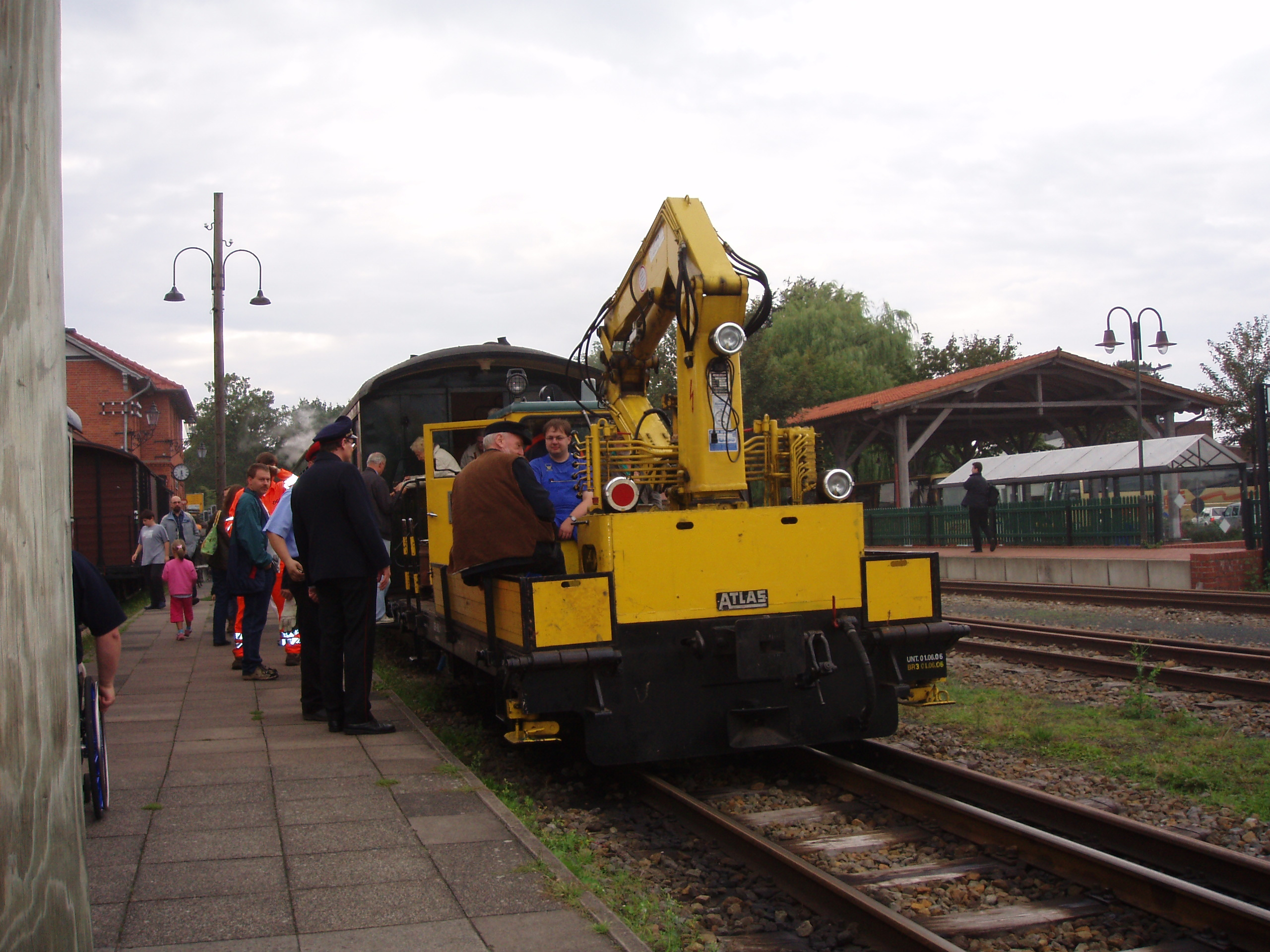
MOW vehicle SKL 1 Friedhelm

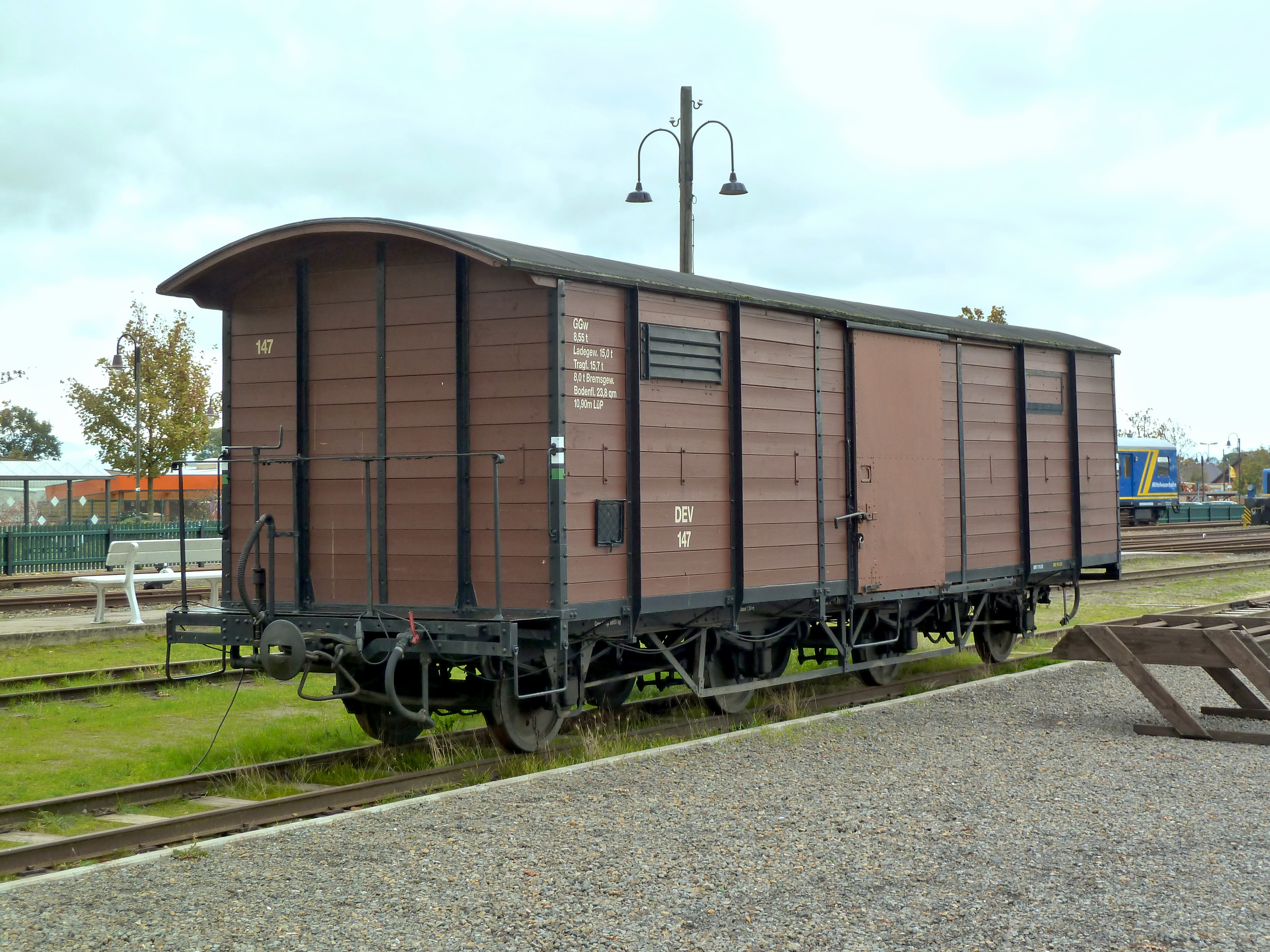
Goods wagon 147

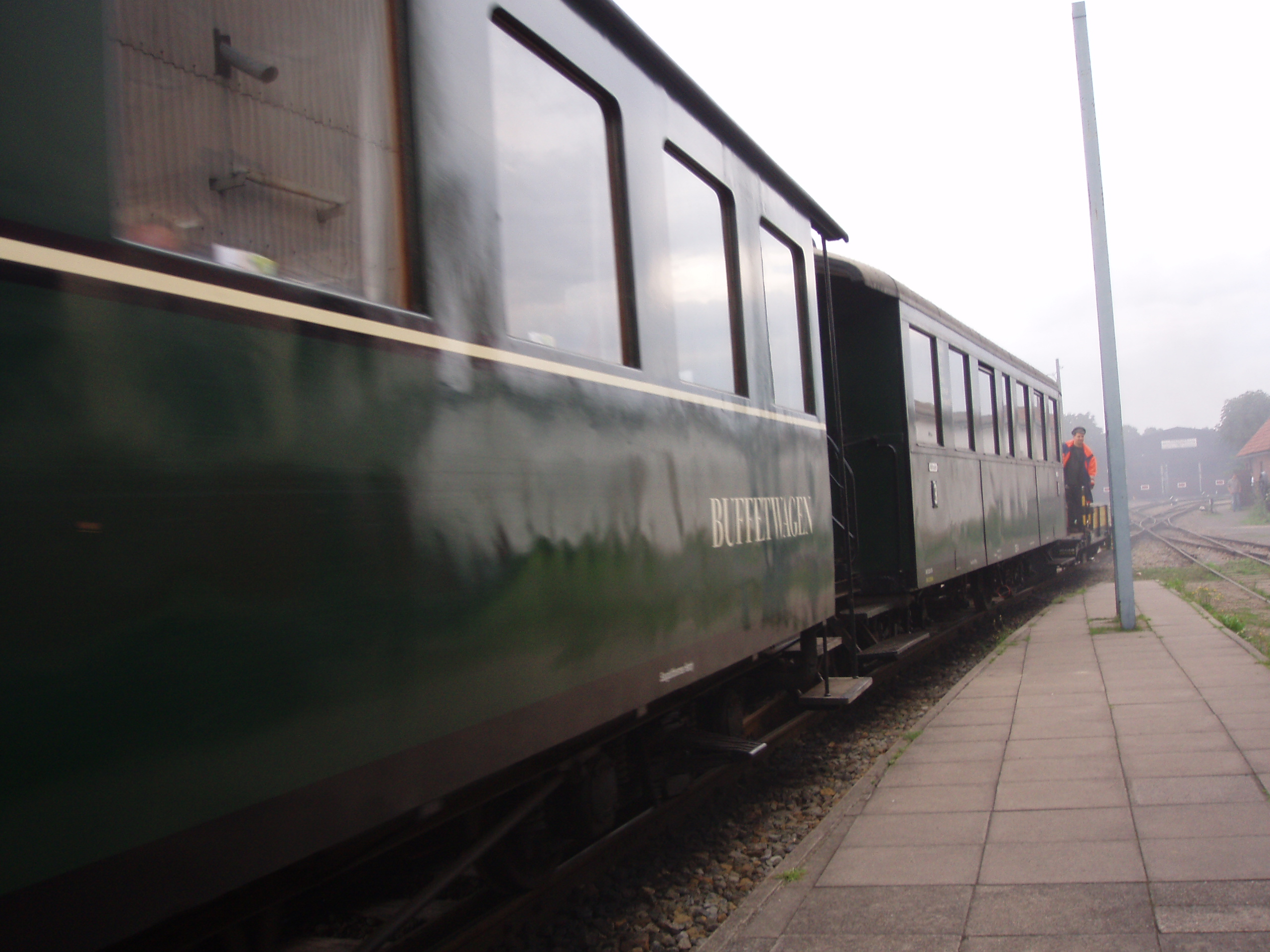
Train with buffet car

In the workshop attached to the museum, increasingly rare skills, such as the rivetting of steam locomotive boilers, are maintained. The operation and maintenance of the vehicles and installations is mainly carried out by volunteers.

== Literature ==
- "Die Museums-Eisenbahn - Zeitschrift für Kleinbahn-Geschichte", the official organ of Deutscher Eisenbahn-Verein e.V. (DEV). ISSN 0936-4609
- Claas Rehmstedt: Die Fahrzeuge der Museums-Eisenbahn Bruchhausen-Vilsen–Asendorf. Verlag Feld- und Schmalspurbahnen Karl Paskarb, Celle 2005. ISBN 3-938278-09-9
- Wolfram Bäumer: Mit Tempo 20 über Land. Bildführer durch das Kleinbahn Museum Bruchhausen-Vilsen. DEV-Kleinbahn-Verlag, Bruchhausen-Vilsen 1995. ISBN 3-9802233-9-6

== Film ==
- Susanne Mayer-Hagmann: Mit dem Zug durchs... Weserland. Deutschlands erste Museumsbahn wurde 1964 im niedersächsischen Bruchhausen-Vilsen gegründet.. ARTE G.E.I.E./SWR, Deutschland, 2007, 43 Min.

== See also ==
- List of railway museums
