= 1978 Bolivian general election =

← 1966	9 July 1978	1979 →
- Presidential election
- Turnout: 102.62% (Note: The final tally established that more votes were cast than the total number of registered citizens.)
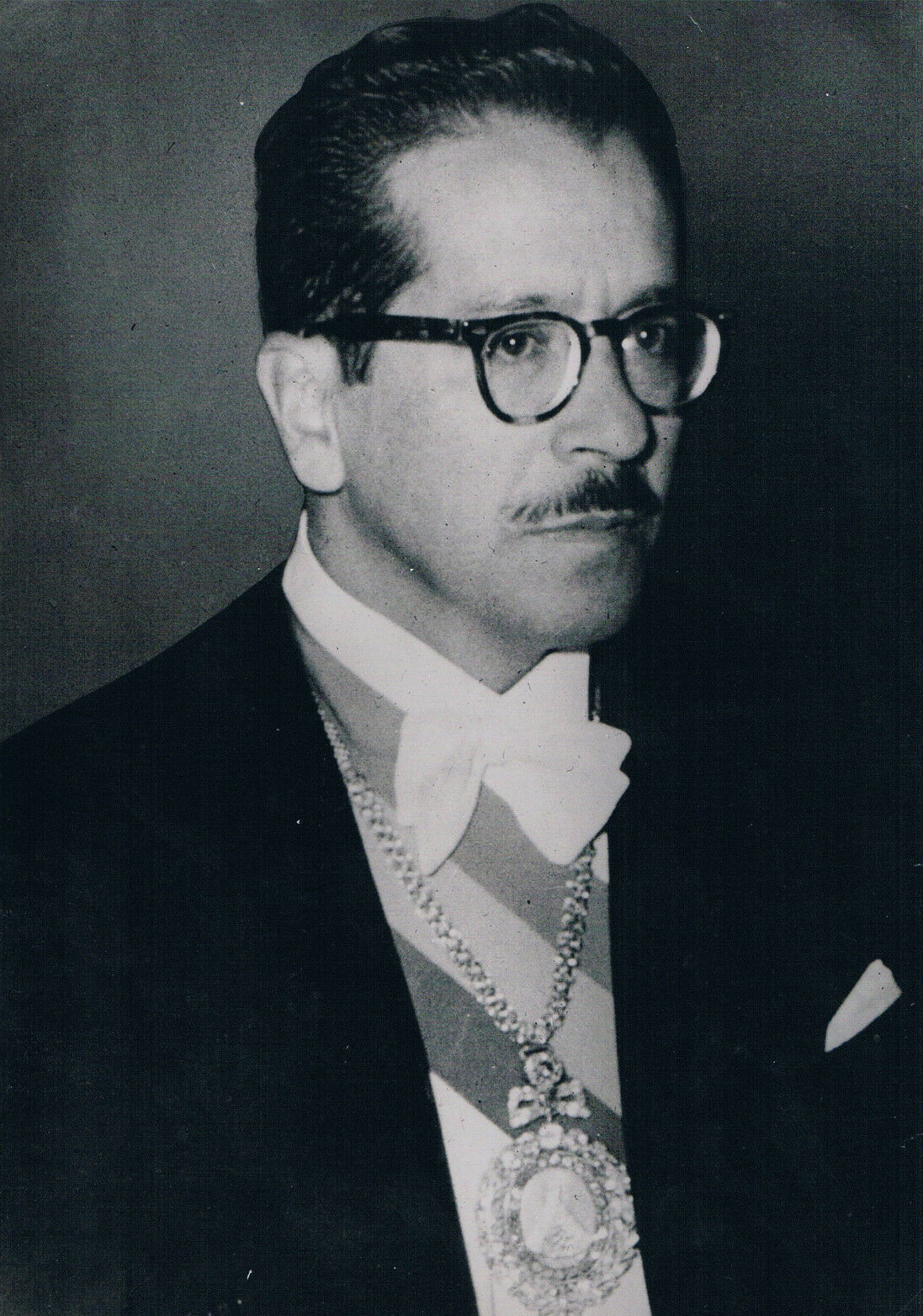

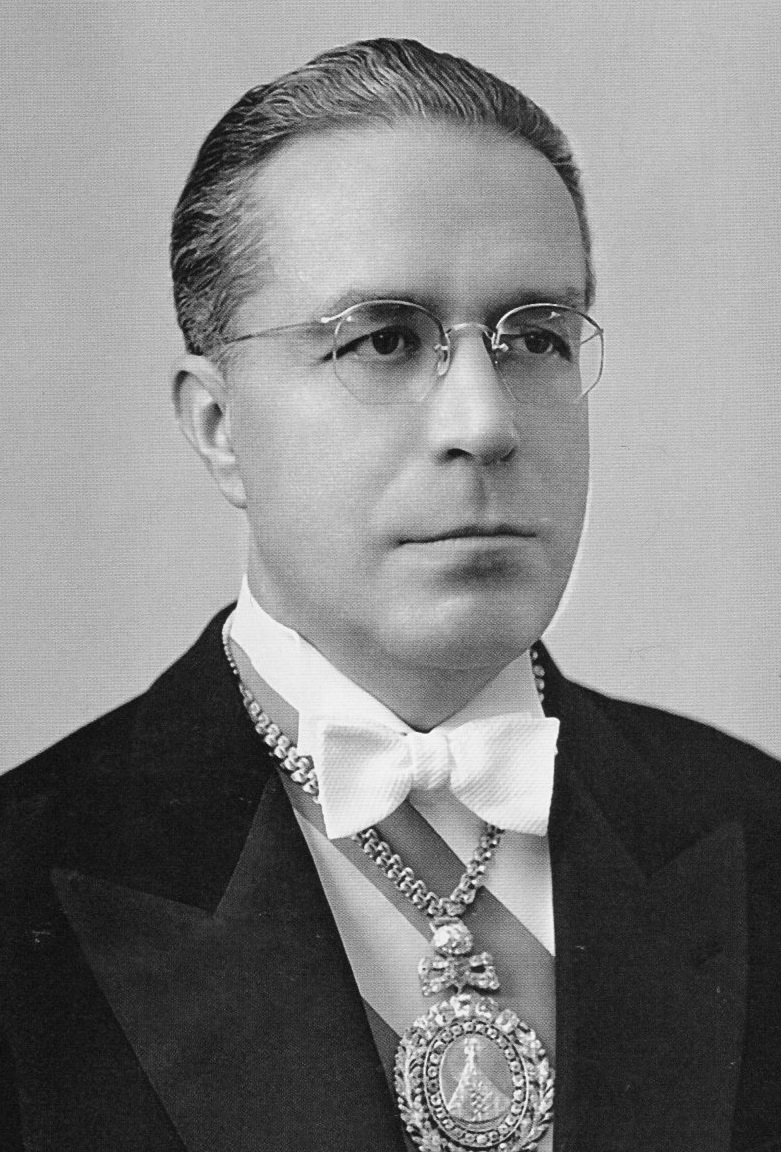
Nominee	Juan Pereda	Hernán Siles Zuazo
Party	UNP (Note: Coalition consisting of CUN, MPC, PL, PSC, PURS, UNB, and pro-military factions of the FSB, MNR, and PRA.); MNRP	FUDP (Note: Coalition consisting of more than 11 parties including MNRI, MIR, PCB, MPLN, VO, and PS-A.)
Running mate	Alfredo Franco Guachalla; Jaime Arellano (Note: On its ballot, the MNRP presented its leader, Jaime Arellano, as Pereda's running mate instead of Alfredo Franco Guachalla.)	Edil Sandóval Morón
Popular vote	1,027,045 (Note: The MNRP presented Juan Pereda as their candidate on a separate ballot from the UNP, resulting in different vote totals. Pereda won 986,140 votes (50.90%) on the UNP ballot and 40,905 (2.11%) votes on the MNRP ballot.)	484,383
Percentage	53.01%	25.01%
Nominee	Víctor Paz Estenssoro	René Bernal Escalante
Party	ADRN (Note: Coalition consisting of MNR and PRA.)	PDC–PRB; PRO (Note: René Bernal Escalante did not accept this candidacy, but nonetheless received votes.)
Running mate	Wálter Guevara	Remo Di Natale
Popular vote	213,622	168,302 (Note: The PRO presented René Bernal Escalante as their candidate on a separate ballot from the PDC, resulting in different vote totals. Bernal won 167,131 votes (8.63%) on the PDC-PRB ballot and 1,171 votes (0.06%) on the PRO ballot.)
Percentage	11.03%	8.69%
President before election
Hugo Banzer
Elected President
Election results annulled
Juan Pereda becomes de facto president

General elections were held in Bolivia on 9 July 1978. The elections were the first held since 1966, with several military coups taking place during the late 1960s and early 1970s. Although Juan Pereda of the Nationalist Union of the People won the presidential elections according to official statements, more votes were cast than there were registered voters. After examining a number of allegations of fraud and other irregularities, the National Electoral Court decided to annul the results on 19 July. The following day, Pereda was installed as President following a military coup. Pereda himself was overthrown by yet another military coup in November, which saw General David Padilla assume the presidency, while fresh elections were held the following year.

== Campaign ==
Several alliances were formed for the elections:

Alliance	Parties
Democratic Alliance of National Revolution	Authentic Revolutionary Party
Democratic Alliance of National Revolution	Revolutionary Nationalist Movement
Democratic and Popular Union	Communist Party
Democratic and Popular Union	Leftwing Revolutionary Nationalist Movement
Democratic and Popular Union	Movement of the National Left
Democratic and Popular Union	Alliance of the National Left
Democratic and Popular Union	Offensive of the Democratic Left
Democratic and Popular Union	Popular Movement for National Liberation
Democratic and Popular Union	Revolutionary Left Movement
Democratic and Popular Union	Socialist Party–Aponte
Democratic and Popular Union	Tupaj Katari Revolutionary Movement
Nationalist Union of the People	Barrientista National Union
Nationalist Union of the People	Bolivian Socialist Falange
Nationalist Union of the People	Committee of National Unity
Nationalist Union of the People	Revolutionary Left Party

Juan Pereda was supported in his presidential bid by both the Nationalist Union of the People and the Nationalist Revolutionary Movement of the People, whilst René Bernal Escalante was the candidate of both the PDC–PRB alliance and the Eastern Rural Party.

== Results ==
The official results were inconsistent; the reported total number of votes cast was 1,971,968, around 50,000 more than the number of registered voters (1,921,556), giving a turnout of 102.6%. However, the total of votes cast for each party and invalid votes was 1,990,671, nearly 20,000 higher than the reported total and representing a turnout of 103.6%.

Candidate	Running mate	Party	Votes	%
Juan Pereda	Alfredo Franco Guachalla	Nationalist Union of the People	986,140	50.90
Hernán Siles Zuazo	Edil Sandóval Morón	Democratic and Popular Union	484,383	25.00
Víctor Paz Estenssoro	Wálter Guevara	Democratic Alliance of National Revolution	213,622	11.03
René Bernal Escalante	Remo di Natale	PDC–PRB	167,131	8.63
Juan Pereda	Jaime Arellano	Revolutionary Nationalist Movement of the People	40,905	2.11
Casiano Amurrio	Domitila Chúngara	Revolutionary Left Front	23,459	1.21
Luciano Tapia Quisbert	Isidoro Copa Cayo	Túpac Katari Indian Movement	12,207	0.63
Marcelo Quiroga Santa Cruz	Carlos Gómez García	Socialist Party – 1	8,323	0.43
René Bernal Escalante	Remo di Natale	Eastern Rural Party	1,171	0.06
Total			1,937,341	100.00
Valid votes			1,937,341	97.32
Invalid/blank votes			53,330	2.68
Total votes			1,971,968	–
Registered voters/turnout			1,921,556	102.62
Source: Nohlen
