= 1979 Bolivian general election =

- 1 July 1979
- Presidential election
- Registered: 1,871,070
- Turnout: 90.19% (▼13.30pp) (Note: Compared to the previous election in which turnout was 103.49% due to fraud.)
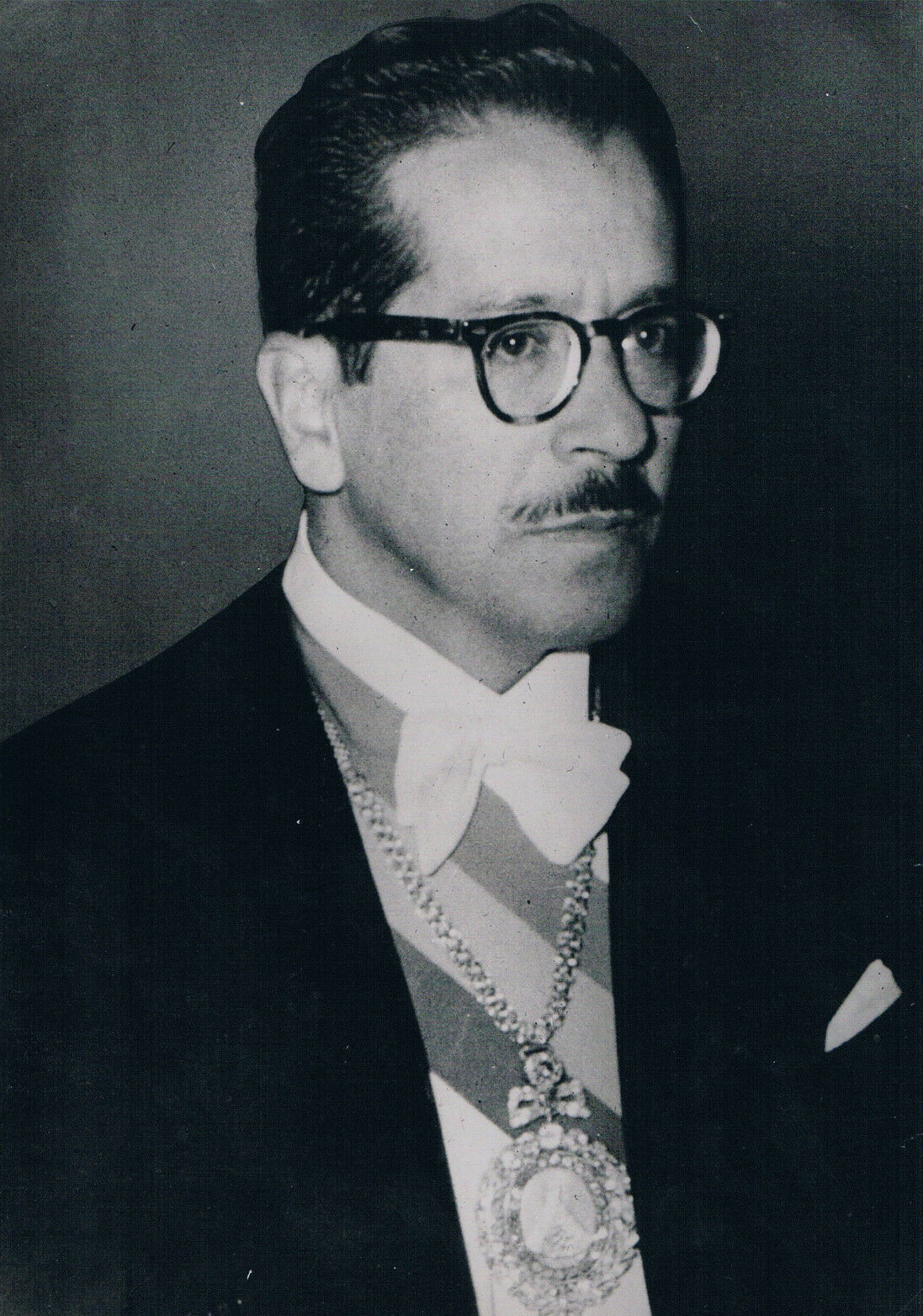

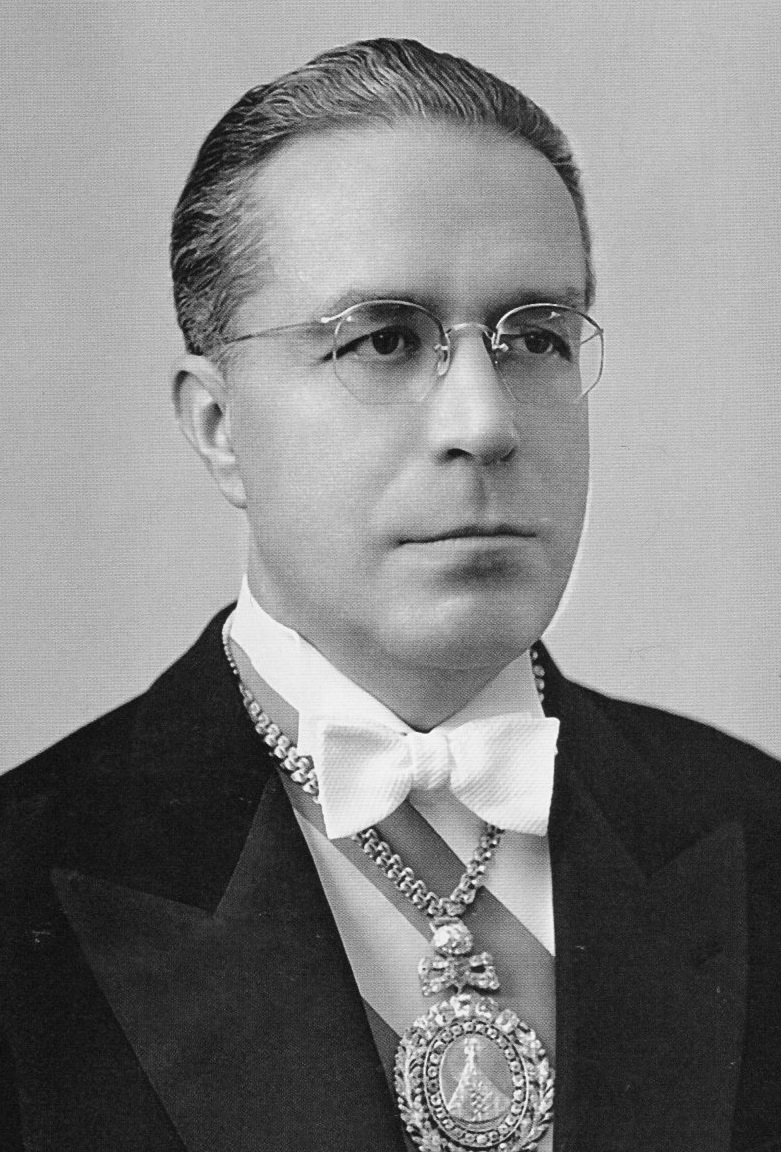

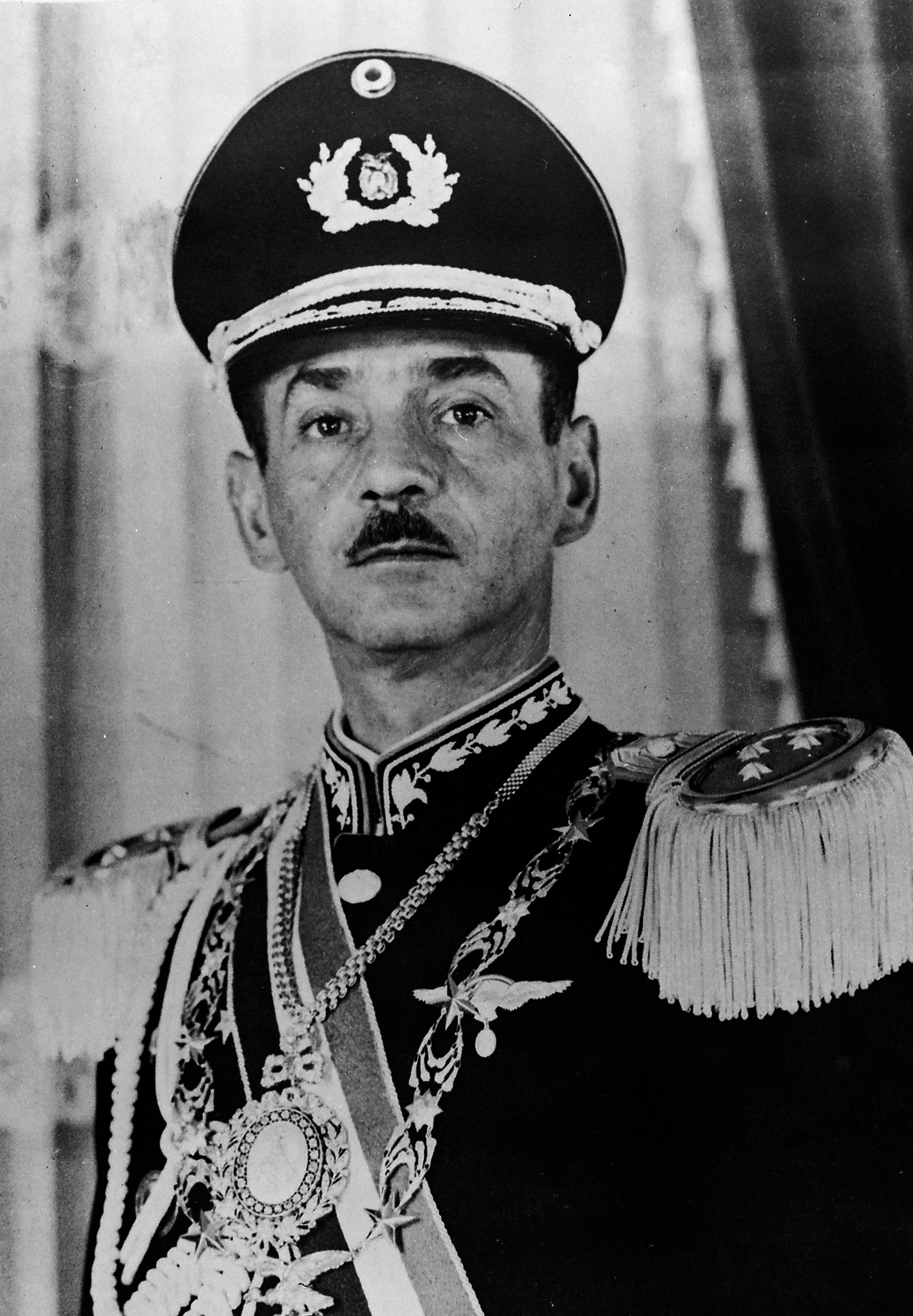
Nominee	Hernán Siles Zuazo	Víctor Paz Estenssoro	Hugo Banzer
Party	MNRI	MNR	ADN
Alliance	UDP (Note: Coalition consisting of MNRI, MIR, PCB, MIN, PS-TA, MPLN, ALIN, PRIN-M, MRE, POR-TP, and ODEUR.)	MNR-A (Note: Coalition consisting of MNR, MNRI-1, and PCB (ML))
Running mate	Jaime Paz Zamora	Luis Ossio	Mario Rolón Anaya
Popular vote	528,696	527,184	218,857
Percentage	35.99%	35.89%	14.88%
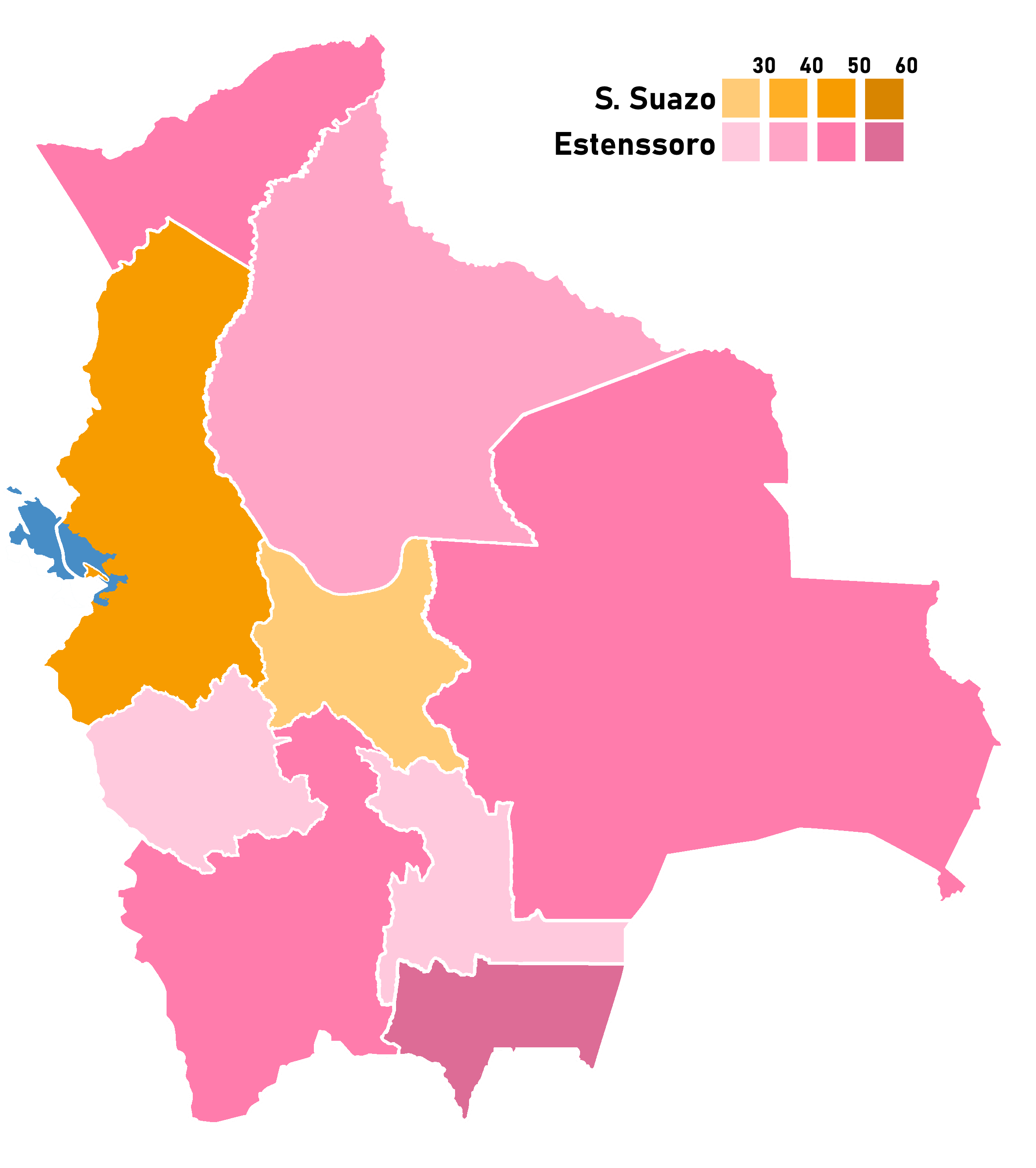
- Results by department
President before election
David Padilla
Elected President
Election results annulled
Wálter Guevara becomes interim president
PRA

General elections were held in Bolivia on 1 July 1979. As no candidate in the presidential elections received a majority of the vote, the National Congress was required to elect a president. However, the Congress failed to elect a candidate after three ballots and instead selected Senate leader Wálter Guevara to serve as Interim President for a year on 8 August. Guevara was later overthrown by a military coup led by Alberto Natusch on 31 October. Fresh elections were held in June 1980.

Although the Democratic and Popular Union received the most votes in the Congressional elections, the Revolutionary Nationalist Movement-Alliance (MNR–A) won the most seats, largely as a result of the electoral system giving more seats to sparsely populated rural areas where the MNR–A was more popular.

== Background ==
General elections had previously been held on 9 July 1978, the first since 1966, with several military coups taking place during the late 1960s and early 1970s. Although Juan Pereda of the Nationalist Union of the People won the presidential elections, more votes were cast than there were registered voters. After examining a number of allegations of fraud and other irregularities, the Electoral Court decided to annul the results on 20 July. The following day, Pereda was installed as president following a military coup. Pereda himself was overthrown by yet another military coup in November, which saw General David Padilla assume the presidency, promising to hold fresh elections in July the following year.

== Campaign ==
In contrast to previous military governments, General David Padilla came to power as the leader of a group of democratically oriented officers committed to returning the country to democratic rule in as short a period of time as possible. As such, Padilla did not use his newfound position to run for election in his own right and instead committed himself to the transfer of power to whoever won the upcoming presidential elections and effect a retreat of the military from government. For this reason, Padilla was remarkably popular during his short (nine-month) stay at the Palacio Quemado. Given the neutrality of the executive, the electoral process had a character of greater freedom though the tense electoral climate was characterized by bitterness and accusations among the various candidates.

The election saw the return of the two ever-present figures in Bolivian politics, Hernán Siles Zuazo of the Leftwing Revolutionary Nationalist Movement (MNRI) in alliance with the Democratic and Popular Union (UDP) and Víctor Paz Estenssoro of the Revolutionary Nationalist Movement (MNR) in alliance with the Revolutionary Nationalist Movement–Alliance (MNR–A). In addition to Siles Zuazo and Paz Estenssoro was Hugo Banzer who just the previous year had seen his 7-year dictatorship come to an end. Banzer ran as a member of the Nationalist Democratic Action (ADN) formed by him on 23 March of that year. The final major candidate was Marcelo Quiroga Santa Cruz of the Socialist Party – 1 (PS-1) who in the previous election had achieved a minuscule 0.43% of the vote. However, since then Quiroga had begun to rise in electoral favor.

Other candidates included René Bernal Escalante of the Popular Alliance for National Integration (APIN) made up of the Bolivian Socialist Falange (FSB), the Revolutionary Agrarian Movement of the Bolivian Peasantry (MARC), and the Christian Democratic Union (UDC). Bernal had received 8.63% of the vote (4th place) in 1978 as a member of the alliance between the Christian Democratic Party (PDC) and the Barrientista Revolutionary Party (PRB). However, in this election, the PDC opted to join in alliance with the MNR–A with only a right-wing splinter group, the UDC, remaining. In turn, the PRB had joined in alliance with the Bolivian Union Party of Walter Gonzáles Valda which positioned itself as a 'revolutionary democratic centre-left nationalist' party. Also in contention were Luciano Tapia Quisbert, the founder and leader of the indigenous political party Túpac Katari Indian Movement (MITKA), and the Workers' Vanguard Party (VO) a small Trotskyist party led by Ricardo Catoira.

A total of 1,378 candidates contested the 144 seats in Congress.

=== Multi-color ballot ===
The multi-colored and multi-sign ballot first used in the 1979 general elections

An important novelty of the 1979 electoral process was the introduction of the multi-color and multi-sign ballot. Previously, each political party had its own ballot, which opened up wide possibilities for manipulation by simply removing ballots for opposition candidates. The multi-color ballot, still in use in Bolivian elections today, is a single ballot sheet presenting segments divided by party colors with symbols of parties and pictures of candidates running for office.

== Results ==
The result was a virtual tie between Siles Zuazo of the UDP and Paz Estenssoro of the MNR-A. As such, the MNR and its splinters returned to being the primary protagonists of Bolivian politics, a fact which had not been the case since the deposition of Paz Estenssoro in 1964. The MNR and MNRI received a collective 71.88% of the vote almost evenly divided between Siles Zuazo's 35.99% and Paz Estenssoro's 35.89% with Siles Zuazo taking the plurality by just 0.10% and 1,512 votes.

Banzer emerged with 14.88% of the vote, a margin considered a triumph for the ex-dictator. Quiroga was also an indisputable victor, rising from 8th place in 1978 to 4th place in 1979 and expanding his vote margin by almost ten times from 8,323 to 70,765. Despite not being elected president, Quiroga and 4 other members of the PS-1 would enter Congress, a position he would use just a month after the election on 30 August to initiate a "trial of responsibilities" to impeach former president Banzer for crimes of state violence and economic malfeasance. Bernal, in turn, fell from 167,131 votes and an 8.63% margin in 1978 to 60,262 votes and a 4.10% margin, a loss of half of his support.

Party	Presidential candidate	Votes	%	Seats	
Party	Presidential candidate	Votes	%	Chamber	Senate
Democratic and Popular Union	Hernán Siles Zuazo	528,696	35.97	38	8
Revolutionary Nationalist Movement–Alliance	Víctor Paz Estenssoro	527,184	35.87	48	16
Nationalist Democratic Action	Hugo Banzer	218,857	14.89	19	3
Socialist Party – 1	Marcelo Quiroga Santa Cruz	70,765	4.82	5	0
Popular Alliance for National Integration	René Bernal Escalante	60,262	4.10	5	0
Túpac Katari Indian Movement	Luciano Tapia Quisbert	28,344	1.93	1	0
Bolivian Union Party	Walter Gonzáles Valda	18,976	1.29	1	0
Workers' Vanguard	Ricardo Catoira	16,560	1.13	0	0
Total		1,469,644	100.00	117	27
Valid votes		1,469,644	86.78		
Invalid/blank votes		223,856	13.22		
Total votes		1,693,500	100.00		
Registered voters/turnout		1,871,070	90.51		
Source: Nohlen 2005, Gisbert 2003

=== By department ===
Department	ADN	MNR	UDP	Others
Beni	33.88%	41.27%	15.85%	9.00%
Chuquisaca	11.19%	38.60%	38.56%	11.65%
Cochabamba	18.56%	27.91%	29.20%	24.34%
La Paz	16.29%	16.37%	54.76%	12.57%
Oruro	9.19%	39.97%	31.31%	19.52%
Pando	23.65%	56.50%	12.31%	7.54%
Potosi	7.82%	51.41%	33.48%	7.29%
Santa Cruz	15.40%	56.35%	18.33%	9.92%
Tarija	14.78%	65.92%	14.70%	4.60%
Source: Constituency-Level Election Archive

== Aftermath ==
As no party reached an absolute majority, Congress was tasked with electing a president from the top three contenders. Hernán Siles Zuazo had won the plurality of the popular vote but not by a clear enough amount to be the obvious choice for president. While Víctor Paz Estenssoro failed to win the plurality by a razor-thin margin, the MNR-A as a whole won a majority in both chambers of Congress with 48 seats in the Chamber of Deputies and 16 seats in the Chamber of Senators, double the number of the next largest party. However, it was the presence of the ADN, which had no feasible path to victory and yet uncompromisingly decided to vote entirely for their candidate Hugo Banzer, and the decision of the minor parties to abstain which ultimately cost Paz Estenssoro the presidency by just 5 votes.

Party	Presidential candidate	Votes	%
Democratic and Popular Union	Hernán Siles Zuazo	46	31.9
Revolutionary Nationalist Movement	Víctor Paz Estenssoro	64	44.4
Nationalist Democratic Action	Hugo Banzer	22	15.3
Abstained		12	8.3
Total		144	100

After a total of six ballots, no candidate was able to achieve the majority. In light of the uncompromising situation, on 6 August, the MNR proposed that Congress elect Wálter Guevara, the President of the Senate, to hold the position of interim president until new elections could be called the following year. Guevara was not a member of any of the three parties in contention, instead being the leader of the Authentic Revolutionary Party (PRA), an offshoot of the MNR which had both opposed and supported Paz Estenssoro in various elections. The proposal was accepted by all parties except the PS-1 and MITKA.

On 8 August 1979 Padilla handed his mandate to Guevara with new elections scheduled for 29 June 1980. However, Guevara's mandate would be cut short before that date as his government was deposed on 1 November by Alberto Natusch, who himself would last only until 16 November when he agreed to resign on the basis that Guevara did not return to his position as president. President of the Chamber of Deputies Lidia Gueiler Tejada would be subsequently elected interim president and would oversee the 1980 elections.

== See also ==
- Bolivian National Congress, 1979–1980

== Bibliography ==
- Gisbert, Carlos D. Mesa (2003). Presidentes de Bolivia: entre urnas y fusiles : el poder ejecutivo, los ministros de estado (in Spanish). Editorial Gisbert.
