= National Unity Committee (Bolivia) =

Defunct political party in Bolivia

National Unity Committee Comité de Unidad Nacional
- Abbreviation: CUN
- Founded: November 1977
- Registered: April 1978
- Dissolved: April 1979
- Ideology: National conservatism Technocracy
- Political position: Right-wing
- National affiliation: Nationalist Union of the People (1978)

The National Unity Committee (Spanish: Comité de Unidad Nacional; CUN) was a political party in Bolivia that existed from 1977 to 1979. The party espoused national conservative and technocratic principles, and generally sat at the right wing of the political spectrum.

Established at the outset of the democratic transition in November 1977, the party primarily consisted of technocrats who had served in the government of Hugo Banzer. Led by Gastón Villa and later Ronald MacLean, it endorsed Banzer as its candidate for president before shifting its support to the regime's surrogate, Juan Pereda. The CUN was a component of the Nationalist Union of the People in the 1978 general election, and its leadership was responsible for the alliance's election manifesto.

The CUN won four seats in the Chamber of Deputies as part of Pereda's landslide victory. Following the annulment of the results due to electoral fraud, the party supported the coup d'état that propelled Pereda to the presidency. It held several posts in the Pereda administration and was responsible for two ministries in the president's cabinet, being the only party to remain in government by the end of Pereda's tenure.

Deposed alongside Pereda in another coup d'état in November 1978, the CUN faded into obscurity. Its membership was largely folded into Nationalist Democratic Action, founded by Banzer to contest the 1979 general election. Multiple past members, including MacLean, continued their political careers in the new party.

== History ==
=== Background ===
Historian Gary Prado Salmón states that, at the height of military rule in Bolivia, from the mid-1960s to '70s, there were never more than fifty officers holding public office at a time. In contrast, "around every military leader, president, minister, or mayor, there were always technocrats" who advised on and proposed many of the policy measures enacted by the various regimes. In this period, mid-level technocrats co-opted many undersecretary positions within government ministries, as well as the boards of directors of state-owned enterprises. During the dictatorship of Hugo Banzer, who seized power in 1971, a burgeoning technocratic elite influenced by his ideology developed.

=== Establishment ===
In late 1977, Banzer initiated a carefully-managed democratic reopening. Having announced his intent to run in the upcoming election, Banzer began discussions with pro-government fronts for the establishment of a National Unity Party (PUN). The scheme – developed by the president's advisors – failed to convince the parties, who were unwilling to cede their independence to the regime.

In November, the National Unity Committee (CUN) was established under the auspices of Banzer. It was headed by Gastón Villa, who resigned his position as manager of the Bolivian Development Corporation to lead the party. Ronald MacLean and Hermán Antelo were also lead figures in the party. Its leaders and membership were made up of civil servants and technocrats operating in the administration, in addition to private sector professionals sympathetic to the regime. (Note: This article cites multiple individuals as being members of the party. For a full membership list, see Presencia 2 April 1978, p. 16.) Ideologically, the CUN supported the continuance of the political and economic model implemented by the Banzer administration. Its political programme, though extensive, eschewed making many formal commitments, states Prado.

For critics of the regime, the CUN was a transparent substitute for the failed PUN. Former president Luis Adolfo Siles described it as demonstrating Banzer's "elitist inclinations [and] arrogant paternalism". "Parties are not born from big business, but from the very heart of the people". Its members' perceived political opportunism and collaborationism, according to Prado, meant that "no one took their ideas seriously". For his part, Villa rejected the CUN's characterization as a "party of technocrats", stating that it had seen its most significant growth among the middle class. "I don't see why [technocrats] can't do politics; on the contrary, they can do it more efficiently", he added.

The CUN backed the candidacy of Banzer for the 1978 general election. Following Banzer's decision to drop out, the party pivoted to support Juan Pereda, the regime's endorsed candidate. Leaders of the CUN participated in negotiations with other parties to form a united front around Pereda, resulting in the formation of the Nationalist Union of the People (UNP) alongside several other parties in February 1978. The CUN wielded significant influence within the UNP, to the extent that Pereda invited Villa to direct the alliance's ideology department and draft its election manifesto. MacLean subsequently assumed party leadership after Villa stepped down to work on the UNP's platform.

The party initiated its organizing efforts in Trinidad, Beni, targeting university students, young professionals, and independents sympathetic to their policies. By late February, the CUN had expanded into Santa Cruz, and by mid-March, Villa stated that it had established branches in Cochabamba, Oruro, and Tarija. Regarding its growth, party member Antonio Ormachea declared that the CUN had "become, from an elite, a strong and massive current of political pressure". In April, the party was registered with the National Electoral Court.

=== In government ===
The CUN won four seats in the Chamber of Deputies in the congressional election that July: Villa, representing Chuquisaca; Ormachea, representing Potosí; and MacLean and Hugo Torres, representing Santa Cruz. Pereda's landslide victory in the concurrent presidential election, however, was marred by the massive electoral fraud perpetuated by the regime. The results were consequently annulled amid rising unrest, leading Pereda and the UNP to overthrow Banzer and seize power in a coup d'état on 21 July.

The coup provoked the resignation of Villa as a party member due to his personal loyalty to Banzer. In contrast, the CUN under MacLean backed Pereda's takeover and assumed positions in government. MacLean and Juan Luzio became personal advisors to the president, as his legal advisor and private secretary, respectively, while Ormachea was appointed to serve on the National Board of Social Action. More significant, the CUN was given charge of a ministry in the president's cabinet, through the appointment of Jaime Larrazábal as minister of energy. In November, Pereda reshuffled his cabinet to include a majority of military officers. MacLean, designated minister of planning, was among just four non-officers appointed.

Even as other UNP member parties were expelled from the regime, the CUN remained aligned with Pereda. It was the lone non-signatory to the document that – citing Pereda's sidelining of civilian politicians – dissolved the UNP alliance. The CUN remained in government until it was toppled alongside the rest of Pereda's regime on 24 November, after another coup d'état led by the Armed Forces.

=== Dissolution and aftermath ===
In the wake of Pereda's ouster, the CUN was folded back into Banzer's political orbit. (Note: The CUN is not cited in any sources as having formally disbanded. However, the party effectively dissolved as an entity after it was not re-registered to participate in the 1979 general election.) In 1979, Villa became a founding member of Nationalist Democratic Action (ADN), which served as the political vehicle for Banzer to pursue his electoral ambitions. Figures like MacLean were incorporated into the party shortly thereafter. MacLean, in particular, went on to lead a prosperous political career in ADN, becoming mayor of La Paz. MacLean was affiliated with the party's "techno-bureaucratic" wing and became part of a sector of "pragmatic modernists" that attempted to transition ADN away from being a personalist party, to little success. He captured the party's presidential nomination in 2002 but lost the election by a wide margin.

== Ideology ==
The CUN described itself as nationalist. Its platform, according to Villa, was "fundamentally focused" on intensive development of the primary sector, with large investments in agriculture and industry, especially in the Altiplano and Interandean Valles. The party was critical of past land reform, stating that the agrarian reform of 1953 needed to be accompanied by an "agrarian revolution" that significantly increased the level of state investment. These policies were pinpointed as the most viable path to economic growth.

The party supported the existing model of state capitalism wherein the public sector retained government ownership over a significant proportion of assets. Strategic sectors, such as the hydrocarbon, mining, and petrochemical industries, were to remain under state control, though only at a base level, with financial derivatives in the hands of the private sector or public–private partnerships. The party was more open to private investment in state-owned enterprises in other fields through the issuance of shares.

== Electoral history ==
Year	Presidential ticket		Alliance	Votes			Result	Ref.
Year	Nominee	Running mate	Alliance	Total	%	P.	Result	Ref.
1978	Juan Pereda	Alfredo Franco	UNP	986,140	50.90	1st	Annulled	
Source: Plurinational Electoral Organ | Electoral Atlas
