= July 1978 Bolivian coup d'état =

Overthrow of the Bolivian Banzer regime

July 1978 Bolivian coup
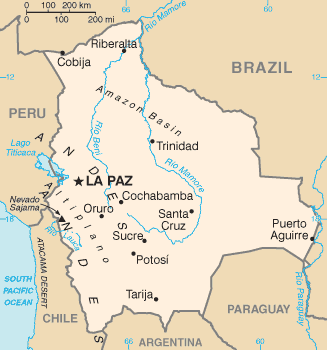
Date	21 July 1978
Location	Santa Cruz de la Sierra, Bolivia
Result	Coup d'état successful: Hugo Banzer overthrown; Juan Pereda was installed as the Head of Government

Belligerents
Government of Bolivia	(Bolivia) Bolivian Army

Commanders and leaders
(Bolivia) Hugo Banzer	(Bolivia) Juan Pereda

The July 1978 Bolivian coup d'état was the military takeover of the Bolivian government by General Pereda and his supporters at the expense of the Banzer regime. The Junta of Commanders that seized power in the coup promptly installed General Pereda as President of Bolivia on July 21, 1978. President Pereda would act as the Head of Government from July 21 until November 24, 1978, when he was overthrown in another coup led by General Padilla four months later.

== Coup attempt ==
Colonel Hugo Banzer came to power following the Santa Cruz rebellion and insurrections against socialist president Juan José Torres which began on August 10 and lasted until August 21, 1971. President Banzer initially governed in coalition with the Revolutionary Nationalist Movement (MNR) and the Bolivian Socialist Falange, forming the Nationalist Popular Front. However, the coalition government broke down on November 9, 1974, when President Banzer enacted Supreme Decree 11947, which banned political activity and made the Bolivian army assume total control of the country.

On November 1, 1977, President Banzer announced general elections through Decree 1516, mandating that the elected officials amend the Political Charter and function as a regular congress afterwards. He made further decrees, namely Decrees 15.237 and 15.363, which established the National Electoral Court and the Electoral Districts in preparation for the elections scheduled for July 9, 1978.

In an attempt to ensure the smooth continuation of his regime (continuismo), President Banzer backed his former minister of the interior, General Pereda, in the upcoming July elections. His candidate faced two main opposing coalitions: the Union Democrática Popular (UDP) ticket led by Hernan Siles Zuazo, and the MNR-Histórico/Auténtico ticket, led by Victor Paz Estenssoro.

To combat the growing popularity of the UDP and ensure General Pereda would win, President Banzer orchestrated massive electoral fraud in favor of his candidate, a mistake which caused the United States to temporarily align themselves with the UDP, making Pereda's apparent electoral victory difficult to be accepted without major opposition. President Banzer tried to remedy the situation by admitting to the fraud and making the National Electoral Court annul the results of the election, announcing that he would transfer power to a military junta who would hold new elections in six months.

However, this decision was met with resistance from General Pereda, who staged a military coup in Santa Cruz with the backing of civilian and military elements demanding that his victory be recognized. After much intense negotiations, President Banzer finally resigned and transferred power to the Junta of Commanders. The military triumvirate immediately installed General Pereda on July 21, 1978. He would go on to act as Head of Government from July 21 until November 24, 1978, until he was overthrown in another coup four months later by General Padilla.
