= Authentic Revolutionary Party =

Authentic Revolutionary Party Partido Revolucionario Auténtico
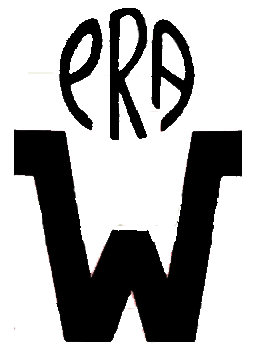
- Leader: Wálter Guevara
- Founded: 1960
- Dissolved: 1980
- Split from: Revolutionary Nationalist Movement
- Headquarters: La Paz
- Ideology: Nationalism; Liberal conservatism
- Political position: Centre-right
- National affiliation: Nationalist Union of the People (1978); Revolutionary Nationalist Movement – Alliance (1979)
- Colours: Blue

The Authentic Revolutionary Party (Spanish: Partido Revolucionario Auténtico, PRA) was a political party in Bolivia.

== History ==
The Authentic Revolutionary Party was founded in 1960 as a faction of the Revolutionary Nationalist Movement (MNR), the ruling party under the presidency of Víctor Paz Estenssoro by Wálter Guevara Arze, formerly a major MNR ideologist and foreign minister, who unsuccessfully opposed Víctor Paz Estenssoro in the 1960 presidential election, polling 14% of the votes.

The party was led by Guevara Arze, Jorge Ríos Gamarra and José Luis Jofre.

The Authentic Revolutionary Party adopted a reformist, nationalist position critical of what it saw as the excessive influence of left-wing labor unions in the Revolutionary Nationalist Movement and in Bolivian politics generally.

By 1962, Guevara Arze had become convinced that the MNRA must establish its own identity separate from that of the MNR, so it was rechristened the Authentic Revolutionary Party – except for a small band of dissidents, who deserted Guevara Arze's leadership and retained the old name.

The PRA ran congressional candidates in 1962, but abstained from the 1964 voting as a measure of its continued opposition to Víctor Paz Estenssoro.

The Authentic Revolutionary Party supported the General René Barrientos Ortuño coup of 4 November 1964, overthrowing Víctor Paz Estenssoro. Wálter Guevara Arze and the PRA formally backed René Barrientos' presidential candidacy in 1966, and the Authentic Revolutionary Party served as part of the governing coalition of parties until 1969. Even after Barrientos' death, Guevara Arze continued as Bolivia's ambassador to the United Nations under Presidents Luis Adolfo Siles Salinas and Alfredo Ovando Candía, until 1970.

The Authentic Revolutionary Party was in less sympathy with the Hugo Banzer Suárez government and opposed that regime's continuance after 1974, when Guevara Arze was sent into exile after he criticized the Government.

In the 1978 and 1979 presidential elections the Authentic Revolutionary Party supported Víctor Paz Estenssoro's candidacy for the presidency, with Guevara Arze as his running mate in 1978. A splinter faction led by Ríos backed the Nationalist Union of the People of Juan Pereda in 1978, then Nationalist Democratic Action of Hugo Banzer in 1979.

In 1979 Guevara Arze was elected president of the Senate. On 8 August 1979, when Congress could not agree on a choice of president between the two major candidates, he was appointed interim President of the Republic, pending the holding of new elections in May 1980. He held this post for less than three months, being overthrown by Colonel Alberto Natusch Busch. The two weeks which followed were perhaps Guevara Arze's finest as a statesman; he vigorously opposed Alberto Natusch Busch and helped rally civilian and military opposition to the colonel's ruthless rule. Alberto Natusch Busch was driven from office – but political compromises were necessary which prevented Wálter Guevara Arze from reassuming the interim presidency. That post went to Lidia Gueiler Tejada, a dissident leader of the Revolutionary Party of the Nationalist Left, who had also backed Víctor Paz Estenssoro in the 1979 general election.

As interim President, Lidia Gueiler Tejada was entrusted with the task of conducting the nation to new general elections in 1980. The Authentic Revolutionary Party has little popular following or basis for existence beyond Guevara Arze's personal ambitions and prestige, and it is chiefly useful for backstage maneuvering and coalition-building. When the party ran Wálter Guevara Arze as its candidate on 29 June 1980, it garnered only a 02.78% vote. On 17 July 1980 Lidia Gueiler Tejada was overthrown in turn by General Luis García Meza Tejada.

The Authentic Revolutionary Party has had no political power in decades.
