= Popular Movement for National Liberation =

Former political party in Bolivia

The Popular Movement for National Liberation (Spanish: Movimiento Popular de Liberación Nacional, MPLN) was a left-wing political party in Bolivia. In 1972, Ramiro Velasco Romero split from the Revolutionary Left Movement and founded the Popular Movement for National Liberation.

In 1978 the political party took out a pamphlet where they explain its origin, where they talk about its influence from the Ñancahuazú Guerrilla, the Foquismo, and the social and political crisis lived in Bolivia..In 1978, 1979, and 1980 the MPLN took part in an electoral coalition Democratic and Popular Union backing Hernán Siles Zuazo.

In 1983, the Popular Movement for National Liberation merged with the Socialist Party-One.

The Socialist Party-One presented Ramiro Velasco Romero as its presidential candidate in 1985 and 1993.
