= Blanca Elena Paz =

- Born: November 21, 1953; Santa Cruz de la Sierra

Blanca Elena Paz (born November 21, 1953) is a Bolivian poet and short story writer.

Blanca Elena Paz was born on November 21, 1953 in Santa Cruz de la Sierra. She studied nursing, veterinary medicine, and zoology in Brazil and Argentina. During the 1971 Bolivian coup d'état, her father was executed and in 1974 her boyfriend disappeared. She studied in Argentina during the Dirty War and a number of her acquaintances were among the disappeared.

Seven of her short stories were included Taller del Cuento Nuevo (1986), an anthology of authors from Santa Cruz. English translations of her stories appeared in the anthologies Fire from the Andes : Short Fiction by Women from Bolivia, Ecuador, and Peru (1998) and Oblivion and Stone: A Selection of Contemporary Bolivian Poetry and Fiction (1998). She published two volumes of short stories, Teorema (1995) and Onir (2002). The latter volume included the story "Historia de barbero", which was adapted into a short film by Jorge Arturo Lora.

== Bibliography ==
- Teorema (Editorial Litera Viva, Santa Cruz, 1995)
- Onir (Editorial La Hoguera, Santa Cruz, 2002)
