= Socialist Party (Bolivia, 1971) =

The Socialist Party (Spanish: Partido Socialista, PS) was a left-wing (socialist) political party in Bolivia.

This Socialist Party was established on 1 May 1971 by the merger of three small parties (Acción Popular, Frente de Liberación Nacional (FLIN) and Grupo FARO) supporting the former military Co-President (1964–1966) and the President (1966, 1969–1970) General Alfredo Ovando Candía, who had been deposed by a radical left-wing faction on 6 October 1970.

Led by Marcelo Quiroga Santa Cruz, Mario Miranda Pacheco, Alberto Bailey Gutiérrez, and Guillermo Aponte Burela.

The Socialist Party declared itself to be Marxist and independent of Soviet or Chinese influence, favoring popular anti-imperialist unity, directed by the working class, which would end domestic injustice and foreign intervention. The PS's basic ideas differed little from those of the left wing of the Revolutionary Nationalist Movement, or of the Revolutionary Party of the Nationalist Left, except that greater stress was placed on the proletariat's "directive" role, and on the word "Socialism" itself, by the Socialist Party. What the Socialist Party sought to offer that other parties perhaps could not was responsible leadership, prepared to act on declared principles rather than in the service of personal ambitions. Marcelo Quiroga Santa Cruz, in particular, had established a deserved reputation for honesty and courage during the President René Barrientos years, when he had several times been arrested and imprisoned by the police. Having supported the left-wing regime of General Juan José Torres without being in the Government, the Socialist Party opposed the Hugo Banzer Suárez regime, and returned to the political scene in Bolivia only after Hugo Banzer's fall in 1978.

The Socialist Party split in February 1978, with its then leader, Marcelo Quiroga Santa Cruz, departing to form the Socialist Party-One. The original Socialist Party (right-wing section) chose Guillermo Aponte Burela as its leader. In March 1979, Sabino Tito Atahuichi split from the Socialist Party-Aponte and founded the Socialist Party-Atahuichi.

== The Socialist Party-One ==
The Socialist Party-One took part in the 1978, 1979, and 1980 general elections, running Marcelo Quiroga Santa Cruz and polled 00.43, 04.82 and 08.71 per cent of the vote, respectively. The party won five seats in National Congress in 1979 and eleven in 1980.

Some elements in the conservative military feared Marcelo Quiroga Santa Cruz's potential following as an opposition leader and he was killed during the Luis García Meza Tejada coup of 17 July 1980. His death leaves his Socialist Party-One – and Bolivian left-wing politics generally – in a greatly weakened condition.

In 1984 the Socialist Party-One absorbed the small ultra-left “Spartacist Revolutionary Movement” (Movimiento Revolucionario Espartaco, MRE), led by Dulfredo Rua.

The Socialist Party-One presented Ramiro Velasco Romero as its candidate in the 1985 elections, but he won only 02.58 per cent of the vote, coming sixth. The party won five seats in National Congress.

In the 1989 elections the Party presented Roger Cortez Hurtado and he won 2.8 per cent of the vote.

In 1993 the Socialist Party-One took part in an electoral coalition United Left backing Ramiro Velasco Romero, a leader of the PS-1. He won only 0.9 per cent of the vote.

There is also a dissident Socialist Party-One-Marcelo Quiroga, led by José María Palacios.

== The Socialist Party-Aponte ==
In 1978 the Socialist Party-Aponte took part in an electoral coalition Democratic and Popular Union backing Hernán Siles Zuazo.

In 1980 the Socialist Party-Aponte took part in an electoral coalition Democratic Revolutionary Front-New Alternative backing Luis Adolfo Siles Salinas.

After the coup d'état on 17 July 1980 the Socialist Party-Aponte disappeared.

== The Socialist Party-Atahuichi ==
In 1979 and 1980 the Socialist Party-Atahuichi took part in an electoral coalition Democratic and Popular Union backing Hernán Siles Zuazo.

After the coup d'état on 17 July 1980 the Socialist Party-Aponte disappeared.
