= UNB =

UNB may refer to:

== Education ==
- National University of Benin (French: Université Nationale du Bénin)
- University of Brasília
- University of New Brunswick
  - University of New Brunswick Fredericton campus (UNBF)
  - University of New Brunswick Saint John campus (UNBSJ)

== Sports ==
- University of New Brunswick
  - UNB Reds
  - UNB Saint John Seawolves

== Other ==
- Barrientista National Union (Spanish: Unidad Nacional Barrientista), a political party in Bolivia
- Unnilbium (Unb), a chemical element now known as Nobelium
- Union National Bank a bank in the United Arab Emirates
- United News of Bangladesh
- Ultra Narrow Band, a network technology
- UNB (group), a South Korean boy band consisting of winners from The Unit: Idol Rebooting Project
