= Second cabinet of Hernán Siles Zuazo =

Bolivia's presidential cabinet formed 1982

Hernán Siles Zuazo was inaugurated on 10 October 1982 and formed his cabinet.

Ministry / Date	Foreign and Religious Affaire	Interior, Migration and Justice	National Defense	Finance	Planning and Co-ordination	Education and Culture	Labor and Union Affairs	Industry, Commerce and Tourism	Transport and Communications
10.10.1982	Mario Velarde Dorado, MNRI	Mario Roncal Antezana, MNRI	José Ortíz Mercado, ind	Ernesto Aranibar Quiroga, MIR	Arturo Nuñes Del Prado, MNRI	Alfonso Camacho Peña, MIR	Roberto Arnez Villarroel, PCB	Jorge Crespo Velasco, MIR	Hernando Poppe Martinez, MNRI
11.10.1982									
23.10.1982									
22.01.1983								Javier Lupo Gamarra, MNRI	
31.01.1983				Flavio Machicado Saravia, ind		Enrique Ipiña Melgar, ind			
16.05.1983	Marcial Tamayo Saenz, MNRI							Marcelo Barrón Rondón, MNRI	
25.08.1983	José Ortíz Mercado, ind	Federico Alvarez Plata, MNRI	Manuel Cardenas Mallo, MNRI	Fernando Baptista Gumucio, MNRI	Roberto Jordan Pando, MNRI	Alcides Alvarado Daza, MNRI	Ramiro Barrenechea, PCB	Humberto Mur Gutierrez, ind	
29.08.1983									
15.11.1983							Horst Grebe López, PCB		
19.01.1984								Oscar Bonifaz Gutierrez, PDC	
16.02.1984									
28.02.1984								Freddy Justiniano Flores, ind (MIR)	
10.04.1984	Gustavo Fernandez Saavedra, ind			Flavio Machicado Saravia, ind	Ernesto Aranibar Quiroga, MIR	Alfonso Camacho Peña, MIR			
13.04.1984									
10.05.1984									
08.06.1984				Oscar Bonifaz Gutierrez, PDC					
10.10.1984					René Fernández Araoz, MIR		Adalberto Kuajara Arandia, PCB		
17.10.1984				Gualberto Mercado Rodriguez, MNRI				Hugo Montero Mur, MNRI	
26.11.1984							Jorge Medina Pinedo, ind		
10.01.1985	Edgar Camacho Omiste, ind			Francisco Belmonte Cortez, MNRI	Freddy Justiniano Flores, ind (MIR)	Cesar Chavez Taborga, ind	Gonzalo Guzman Eguez, MNRI		
27.02.1985							Gabriel Porcel Salazar, ind (PRIN)		
10.05.1985		Gustavo Sánchez Salazar, ind	Elias Gutiérrez Ardaya, ind					Oscar Farfán Mealla, ind	
23.05.1985									

Ministry / Date	Mining and Metallurgy	Energy and Hydrocarbons	Agriculture and Peasant Affairs	Health and Social Security	Housing and Urbanism	Economic Integration	Press, Information and Sports	Aviation	Secretary to the Cabinet
10.10.1982	Carlos Barragan Vargas, PCB	Jorge O'connor D'Arlach, MIR	Zenon Barrientos Mamani, MNRI	Mario Argandoña Yañez, MIR		Hormando Vaca Diez, MIR	Jorge Gonzáles Roda, MNRI		Horacio Torrez Guzmán, MNRI
11.10.1982								Oscar Villa Urioste, mil	
23.10.1982					Jaime Ponce García, ind (PDC)				
22.01.1983		Jorge Medina Pinelo, ind		Javier Torres Goitia, MNRI					
31.01.1983						Jorge Gonzáles Roda, MNRI	Mario Rueda Peña, MNRI		
16.05.1983			Reynaldo Mercado Uribe, MNRI						
25.08.1983	Carlos Carvajal Nava, PCB					Jorge Agreda Valderrama, PDC			
29.08.1983			Simón Yampara Huarachi, MRTK						Benjamín Miguel Harb, PDC
15.11.1983									
19.01.1984		Carlos Miranda Pacheco, ind	Jorge Medina Pinedo, ind					Antonio Arnez Camacho, mil	
16.02.1984					Fernando Guardia Butron, PDC				
28.02.1984									
10.04.1984		Luis Saucedo Justiniano, PDC			Walter Delgadillo Terceros, MIR				Miguel Urioste Fernández de Córdova, MIR
13.04.1984					Guillermo Capobianco Rivera, MIR				
10.05.1984			Quintin Julio Mendoza Huaynoca, ind						
08.06.1984									
10.10.1984	Horst Grebe López, PCB	Ronanth Zabaleta Mercado, ind							
17.10.1984			Guillermo Moscoso Riveros, MNRI			Percy Fernández Añez, ind			
26.11.1984	Luis Pommier Gómez, MNRI								
10.01.1985					Emilio Ascarrunz Paredes, MNRI				Freddy Peñaloza Orrico, MNRI
27.02.1985									
10.05.1985		Adhemar Velarde Ortiz, ind					Percy Camacho Flores, ind		
23.05.1985								Oscar Villa Urioste, mil	

MNRI – Revolutionary Nationalist Leftwing Movement

ind – independent

MIR – Revolutionary Left Movement

PCB – Communist Party of Bolivia

PDC – Christian Democratic Party

PRIN – Revolutionary Party of the Nationalist Left

MRTK – Tupaj Katari Revolutionary Movement

mil – military
