= Cabinet of David Padilla =

General David Padilla Arancibia had taken the Presidency 24 November 1978, and formed his cabinet.

Ministry / Date	24.11.1978	27.11.1978	16.01.1979	11.05.1979	22.06.1979
Foreign and Religious Affaire	Raul Botelho Gozalves, ind			Jorge Escobari Cusicanqui, ind	
Interior, Migration and Justice	Raul Lopez Leyton, mil				
National Defense	Hugo Céspedes Espinoza, mil				Ismael Saavedra Sandoval, mil
Planning and Co-ordination	Gary Prado Salmón, mil				
Finance	vacancy	Wenceslao Albo Quiroz, ind		Javier Alcoreza Melgarejo, mil	
Education and Culture	Jose Olvis Arias, mil			Simon Sejas Tordoya, mil	
Transport, Communications and Aviation	Ariel Ascarrunz Hurtado, mil		Juan Muñoz Revollo, mil		
Labor and Union Affairs	Vito Ramírez López, mil		Hermes Fellman Forteza, mil		
Industry, Commerce and Tourism	Óscar Jaime Pammo Rodríguez, mil				
Mining and Metallurgy	Jorge Echazú Aguirre, mil				
Energy and Hydrocarbons	Mario Candia Navarro, mil				
Agriculture and Peasant Affairs	Rolando Saravia Ortuño, mil		Félix Villarroel Terán, mil		
Health and Social Security	Luis Rivera Palacios, mil				
Housing and Urbanism	Alrerto Saenz, mil	Norberto Salomón Soria, mil			
Economic Integration	no	no	no	Gustavo Fernández Saavedra, ind	
Press and Information	Victor Aguilar Dorado, mil				
Secretary to the Cabinet	Abel Elías Sainz, mil			Jaime Arancibia Echeverria, ind	

mil – military

ind – independent
