= David Padilla =

53rd President of Bolivia

- Official photograph, c. 1978

53rd President of Bolivia
- In office 24 November 1978 – 8 August 1979
- Vice President: Vacant
- Preceded by: Juan Pereda
- Succeeded by: Wálter Guevara (interim)

Personal details
- Born: David Padilla Arancibia; 13 August 1927 Sucre, Bolivia
- Died: 25 September 2016 (aged 89) La Paz, Bolivia
- Spouse: Marina Goytia Peñaranda
- Parent(s): Roberto Padilla Lazcano; Honoria Arancibia
- Education: Military College of the Army

Military service
- Allegiance: Bolivia
- Branch/service: Bolivian Army
- Years of service: 1943–1979
- Rank: General

David Padilla Arancibia (13 August 1927 – 25 September 2016) was a Bolivian general who served as the 53rd president of Bolivia from 1978 to 1979.

A native of Sucre, Padilla was born on 13 August 1927. Joining the armed forces, he rose to the post of Commander of the Army. He was serving in that capacity when he deposed the also de facto government of General Juan Pereda on 24 November 1978. Pereda had taken the presidency in July of the same year simply because it was available to him, many military leaders having grown tired of the constant manipulations of dictator Hugo Banzer for his personal political ends. Padilla, in contrast, came to power as the leader of a group of democratically oriented officers committed to returning the country to democratic rule in as short a period of time as possible. His goal was simple: to transfer power to whoever won the upcoming presidential elections and effect a retreat of the military to its barracks and posts of operation, where they belonged. For this reason, Padilla was remarkably popular during his short (nine-month) stay at the Palacio Quemado.

The general election of 1 July 1979, on the other hand, turned out to be a fiasco. The leftist candidate Hernán Siles Zuazo finished first at the polls, but without attaining the 50% majority necessary for direct election. Thus, it was left to Congress to determine the next Chief Executive, as stipulated in the Constitution. To the surprise of many, Congress could not agree on any candidate, no matter how many votes were taken. Positions hardened, and no solution seemed possible, until an alternative was offered in the form of the President of the Senate, Wálter Guevara, who was named President for one year pending the calling of new elections in 1980. Padilla duly transferred power to Guevara on 8 August 1979, as he had promised he would. He left the governing palace as an almost universally respected former de facto military leader — a rarity indeed in the history of Bolivia.

Padilla died in La Paz on 25 September 2016, at the age of 89.

== See also ==
- Cabinet of David Padilla

Political offices
Preceded by Juan Pereda	President of Bolivia; 1978–1979	Succeeded by Wálter Guevara; Interim
