= Nationalist Popular Front =

Government coalition in Bolivia, 1971–1974

The Nationalist Popular Front (Spanish: Frente Popular Nacionalista, FPN) was a government coalition in Bolivia which came to power after the August 1971 coup, active during the military regime of Colonel Hugo Banzer until 1974 - when it was dissolved by military decision. The coalition consisted of:

- Bolivian Armed Forces led by President Hugo Banzer;
- Revolutionary Nationalist Movement (MNR) led by Víctor Paz Estenssoro;
- Bolivian Socialist Falange (FSB) led by Mario Gutiérrez.

== History ==
With the instability of the Torres regime, two parties previously considered enemies, the MNR and FSB would come together in alliance with conservative elements of the Armed Forces to overthrow Juan José Torres and recover their political prestige.

With the triumph of the 1971 coup, Colonel Banzer signed an agreement with the MNR and FSB parties, creating the Nationalist Popular Front - a governmental civic-military alliance.

The alliance would fall into disagreement in mid-1973. Banzer's promise to hold elections in 1974 caused parts of the MNR and FSB to abandon the government and move to the opposing side, with only a few political factions remaining.

Paz Estenssoro, Banzer's ally during the August coup, would go over to the opposing side. In November 1973, he would attempt to remove all MNR members from Banzer's cabinet. This decision divided the MNR, with many like Ciro Humboldt refusing to leave his posts. In January 1974, Paz Estenssoro was sent into exile - being accused of "subversion".

The MNR and FSB supported an attempted coup against Banzer on 7 November, which caused a counterattack by Banzer. On November 9, Banzer carried out a self-coup, declaring the end of the government coalition with the definitive expulsion of the MNR and FSB from the government and suspending all parties and social organizations.
