= Túpac Katari Indian Movement =

The Túpac Katari Indian Movement (Spanish: Movimiento Indio Túpac Katari, MITKA) was an Indigenous political party in Bolivia.

The Túpac Katari Indian Movement was founded in April 1978 by Luciano Tapia Quisbert. Proclaiming itself “the political vanguard of the Indian people of Collasuyo” with the policy of returning to communal forms of production and the re-establishment of the indigenous languages, MITKA's base was in the campesino communities of the altiplano (Andean high plain).

The MITKA has its origins in independence movements started under Spanish rule in 1781 (by Túpac Katari in Bolivia and Túpac Amaru II in Peru) and continued as peasant movements in 1946–1952, leading to land reform, universal suffrage and the nationalization of mines between 1952 and 1964, and to the creation of a Túpac Katari Confederation in 1971.

The MITKA's ideology centered on the historical opposition between Indians, the continent's original inhabitants, and the Spanish and their mestizo-criollo descendants, known collectively in Quechua and Aymara as q'aras. This position rejected Marxist dialectics as foreign and denounced the equally alienating character of conventional politics, both right and left.

The MITKA took part in the 1978, 1979 and 1980 elections, running Luciano Tapia Quisbert. He polled 0.63, 1.93 and 1.21 per cent of the vote.

In 1980, Constantino Lima Chávez split from the Túpac Katari Indian Movement and founded the Túpac Katari Indian Movement-1 (MITKA-1). Constantino Lima Chávez adhered to a more extreme line which bordered on outright racism, rejected religious precepts and the validity of political divisions into 'left' or 'right', and maintained that 99% of change would be achieved through the use of violence.

The MITKA-1 took part in the 1980 elections, running Constantino Lima Chávez. He polled 1.30 per cent of the vote.

In 1985 the MITKA and the MITKA-1 disappeared.
