= Ronald MacLean Abaroa =

Ronald MacLean-Abaroa (born in La Paz, 11 March 1949) is a former Bolivian politician and leading international expert in decentralization, devolution of government powers to local citizens, and anti-corruption strategies.

== Biography ==
MacLean-Abaroa was the first democratically elected mayor of La Paz, Bolivia, and was reelected four times between 1985 and 1991 to this office.

Appointed the youngest minister at age 29, he has held five national cabinet positions including planning, foreign affairs, communications, finance, sustainable development and environment, under three different Bolivian presidents. He was Minister of Finance in 2000.

In the late 1990s, he spent three years with the Harvard Institute for International Development as a senior research fellow on governance, leading research on institutional reform and governance, and working on issues of decentralization, devolution of government powers to local citizens and anti-corruption strategies. He also lectures at Harvard Kennedy School.

In March 2002, MacLean-Abaroa won his party's first-ever primary election and the nomination as the presidential candidate of the right wing Nationalist Democratic Action or A.D.N (Acción Democrática Nacionalista), the party founded by former Bolivian Dictator General Hugo Banzer). The June 2002 elections marked his first unsuccessful bid for the presidency of Bolivia. Shortly after, he joined the World Bank as a Lead Public Sector Management specialist on governance, decentralization and poverty reduction.

A founding member of Transparency International, he is on their advisory council and served as the first chairman of TI-Latin America.

MacLean-Abaroa has served as a consultant and advisor on governance and anti-corruption issues to different international organizations and governments. He chaired both the Economic and Social Council of the Andean Pact Countries (1977) and the board of directors of the Andean Development Corporation (2000).

In the private sector, he helped launch, and managed the largest gold mining company in Bolivia, and other mining ventures, before entering politics.

MacLean-Abaroa received his master's degree in public administration (1980) from Harvard Kennedy School, where he became a research fellow, and his bachelor's degree in development economics (1971) from the University of Maryland.

== Bibliography ==
He is the author of several articles and books, notably Corrupt Cities: A Practical Guide to Cure and Prevention (2000), coauthored with Robert Klitgaard and Lindsey Parris, that has been published in five languages.

== See also ==
- Politics of Bolivia

Political offices
Preceded by Carlos Iturralde Ballivián	Foreign Minister of Bolivia; 1992–1993	Succeeded by Roberto Peña Rodríguez
