= Supreme Decree 11947 =

Supreme Decree 11947 was a decree of the military government of Hugo Banzer (1971–1978). Issued on November 9, 1974, it declared the recess of political parties and the complete militarization of the Executive Branch - beginning a new stage of the Banzer regime. This event was caused by the breakup of the Nationalist Popular Front, an alliance formed by the Banzer military government and the MNR and FSB political parties.

== Origins ==
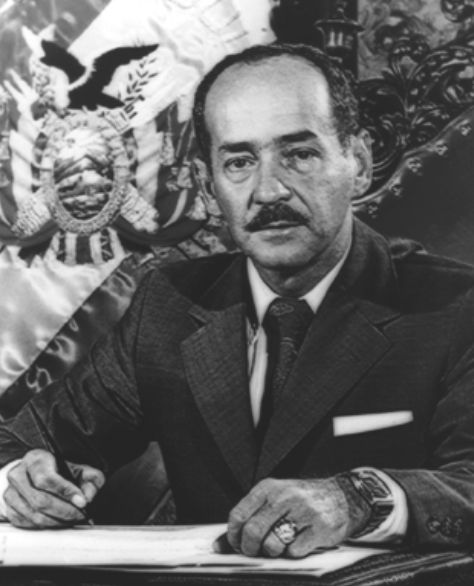
Hugo Banzer

With the triumph of the August 1971 coup, its promoters formed a civic-military government represented by the Nationalist Popular Front (FPN) – an alliance composed of the Armed Forces under President Hugo Banzer, the Revolutionary Nationalist Movement (MNR) of Víctor Paz Estenssoro, and the Bolivian Socialist Falange (FSB) of Mario Gutiérrez.

The governing coalition gradually disintegrated from late 1973. The promise of elections scheduled for 1974 led some of the MNR and FSB to leave the government, with only a few political factions remaining.

On the night of June 4 to 5, 1974, a group of young officers belonging to the Generational Group and led by Gary Prado Salmón and Raúl López Leyton launched an uprising against the government. The rebels, elements of the Tarapacá Regiment, marched with a column of tanks towards La Paz. Among their demands were the removal of the dictator Banzer, the return of Bolivia to constitutionality and the prosecution of all those who have enriched themselves by the State. Government forces successfully suppressed the coup attempt and the rebels surrendered shortly afterwards.

On 7 November, another uprising broke out – dissidents from the Armed Forces with support from elements of the MNR and FSB took the city of Santa Cruz de la Sierra. The declared leaders of the mutiny were former Minister Carlos Valverde Barbery and General Julio Prado Montaño, Gary Prado's father. President Banzer declared a state of siege and managed to crush the rebellion using a corps of paratroopers and Air Force units, reconquering the city. Banzer used the attempted coup as justification to launch a series of authoritarian measures on 9 November – including the cancellation of elections, the dissolution of the alliance with the MNR and FSB, and the banning of political activities. This was described as a self-coup by multiple sources. On the same day, Banzer dismissed Minister José Patiño Ayoroa, accusing him of links to the coup attempt.

== Promulgation ==
The decline of the FPN and a coup attempt convinced Banzer that he no longer needed civilian allies. Inspired by the Chilean and Brazilian model, Banzer announced the complete reorganization of the Bolivian political system and a plan for a "New Bolivia" under military control. His announcements were formulated in Supreme Decree 11947, issued on 9 November 1974.

The consequences and objectives of Decree 11947 were the following:

- Recess of political parties.
- Government run exclusively by the Armed Forces until 1980.
- Cessation of political activities of social entities (union, business and student organizations)
- Civil Service is instituted. Recruitment of Bolivian citizens to perform functions designated by the government.
