= Mario Miranda Pacheco =

Bolivian academic (1925–2008)

- Born: 20 November 1925; Cajuata, Bolivia
- Died: 2008 (aged 82–83); Mexico City, Mexico
- Scientific career
- Fields: Sociology

Mario Miranda Pacheco (20 November 1925 – 2008) was a Bolivian academic who served as a professor of sociology in the National Autonomous University of Mexico.

== Biography ==
Born in rural Bolivia, he obtained his education in La Paz and later became a faculty member at the University of La Paz, also becoming involved in socialist politics.

Following the coup by Hugo Banzer in 1971, Miranda Pacheco fled to Mexico after Banzer's government cracked down on opposition political activities, and lived in exile until his death. Throughout his career in Mexico, he also served as an expert on the history of Bolivia.
