= Túpac Katari Indian Movement – 1 =

The Túpac Katari Indian Movement – 1 (Spanish: Movimiento Indio Túpac Katari – 1; MITKA-1) was an Indigenous political party in Bolivia.

In 1980, Constantino Lima Chávez split from the Túpac Katari Indian Movement and founded the Túpac Katari Indian Movement-1. Constantino Lima Chávez adhered to a more extreme line which bordered on outright racism, rejected religious precepts and the validity of political divisions into 'left' or 'right', and maintained that 99% of change would be achieved through the use of violence.

The MITKA-1 took part in the 1980 elections, running Constantino Lima Chávez. He polled 1.30 per cent of the vote.

In 1985 the MITKA-1 disappeared.
