= Nationalist Union of the People =

The Nationalist Union of the People (Spanish: Unión Nacionalista del Pueblo, UNP) was a right-wing, pro-military electoral political alliance in Bolivia.

The UNP was formed in January 1978 by:

- Bolivian Socialist Falange, FSB (right-wing pro-military faction led by Gastón Moreira Ostria)
- Nationalist Revolutionary Movement, MNR (pro-military faction led by Rubén Julio Castro)
- Authentic Revolutionary Party, PRA (pro-military faction led by Jorge Ríos Gamarra)
- Committee of National Unity, CUN
- Popular Christian Movement, MPC
- Liberal Party, PL
- Barrientista National Union, UNB
- Republican Socialist Unity Party, PURS
- Social Christian Party, PSC.

It presented as its presidential candidate Juan Pereda Asbún (independent) and Alfredo Franco Guachalla (MNR), as vice-presidential candidate.

Leaders of the UNP's member parties served in cabinet after Pereda seized power in July 1978. When Pereda dismissed his ministers in favor of a majority military cabinet, the UNP's leaders dissolved the alliance.
