= Eastern Rural Party =

Defunct political party in Bolivia

The Eastern Rural Party (Spanish: Partido Ruralista Oriental, PRO) was a small right-wing political party in Bolivia.

The Eastern Rural Party was established in 1978 by a large landowner Víctor Hugones.

In 1978 the Eastern Rural Party allied with the Christian Democratic Party and its candidate René Bernal Escalante.

After the elections on 9 July 1978 the Eastern Rural Party disappeared.
