= 1971 Bolivian coup d'état =

Overthrow of Bolivian president Juan José Torres

- Part of the Cold War in South America
Date	18–21 August 1971
Location	Bolivia
Result	Coup attempt successful: Juan José Torres's government overthrown; Nationalist Popular Front coalition assumed power

Belligerents
(Bolivia) Bolivian Government; Bolivian Colorados Regiment	(Bolivia) Nationalist Popular Front; Bolivian Armed Forces; Revolutionary Nationalist Movement; Bolivian Socialist Falange; Supported by: United States; Brazil; Argentina (alleged); Paraguay (alleged)

Commanders and leaders
(Bolivia) Juan José Torres	(Bolivia) Hugo Banzer

The 1971 Bolivian coup d'état was led by military officer Hugo Banzer on August 18, 1971, against the government of president Juan José Torres.

== Political background ==
Following the uprising of October 7, 1970, General Juan José Torres came to power. Torres would form a left-wing nationalist government, with an "anti-imperialist" stance. Torres would try to form a co-government with the Popular Assembly, a workers' organization, the same sector that helped him come to power.

On January 10, 1971, there was an attempted coup against the Torres regime, led by Colonel Hugo Banzer, who was later exiled to Argentina.

== The coup ==
According to the Barcelona Center for International Affairs (CIDOB), on August 18, 1971, Hugo Banzer entered Bolivia clandestinely, being arrested in Santa Cruz and later flown to the Carabineros barracks in La Paz.

The next day, August 19, a rebellion broke out in Santa Cruz led by the Nationalist Popular Front, a movement made up of the military and the Revolutionary Nationalist Movement (MNR) and Bolivian Socialist Falange (FSB) parties. On August 20, Colonel Andrés Selich ordered the shooting of university students in Santa Cruz. The insurgents supposedly freed Banzer from prison and took over radio stations.

In the early hours of August 21, 1971, Juan José Torres and the Bolivian Colorados Regiment called for resistance to the coup. Many took to the streets with this objective, including the socialist leader Marcelo Quiroga Santa Cruz along with other people and students, however, the lack of weapons and disorganization of these played against them. It is estimated that there were around 100 dead and 50 wounded. Many of Torres' military changed sides, with Rubén Sánchez Valdivia being the only loyal military man at the end. With this scenario, Torres was forced to flee and the rebels took the presidential palace. A triumvirate made up of Jaime Florentino Mendieta, Andrés Selich Chop, and Hugo Banzer Suárez himself took power. Later, the junta passed the presidency with full powers to Banzer.

== Foreign involvement ==
Before the coup, Torres's government had been subjected to external pressure from the United States. U.S. ambassador Ernest V. Siracusa (who participated in the coup d'état against Jacobo Arbenz in Guatemala in 1954, then was expelled from Peru in 1968, accused of being a CIA man) ordered him to change his policy, threatening him with financial blockage. The World Bank and the Inter-American Development Bank refused to grant Bolivia the loans necessary to pursue industrial development work.

On June 11, 1971, President Richard Nixon and National Security Advisor Henry Kissinger discussed the possibility of supporting a coup in Bolivia. Later in July, the 40 Committee approved covert funding towards Torres's opposition.

A week after the coup, The Washington Post published a report which claimed that U.S. Air Force Major Robert J. Lundin had advised the plotters and lent them a long-range radio. The report was never substantiated, however, and the State Department denied it immediately, asserting that the United States had no involvement in the overthrow of Torres.

The Brazilian military government openly supported the Bolivian coup. Brazilian Air Force planes dropped weapons, including ammunition, rifles, and machine guns, to the rebels in Santa Cruz de la Sierra. Additionally, troops from the II Army, commanded by General Humberto Melo, were deployed to Mato Grosso, ready to intervene if necessary.

According to former U.S. ambassador to Argentina John Davis Lodge, the government of dictator Alejandro Agustín Lanusse was also involved in the coup.

== Consequences ==
After this, Hugo Banzer started a new military dictatorship in Bolivia for seven years that banned unions and civil rights, being a participant in the so-called Operation Condor, which killed or caused the disappearance of hundreds of people in Bolivia.

Juan José Torres, on the other hand, went into exile in Buenos Aires, where he was kidnapped and killed in 1976 as part of Operation Condor. Hugo Banzer was overthrown by a new military uprising in 1978.

== See also ==
- Coups d'état in Bolivia
- History of Bolivia (1964–1982)
