= Barrientista National Unity =

The Barrientista National Union (Spanish: Unidad Nacional Barrientista, UNB) was a right-wing "Barrientista" political party in Bolivia.

The Barrientista National Union was founded by Rolando Pardo Rojas and Eduardo S. Noda Pizarro in April 1977 and supported the military Government of the President Hugo Banzer Suárez.

In 1978 the Barrientista National Union took part in an electoral coalition with the Nationalist Union of the People backing Juan Pereda Asbún.

In 1979 the UNB dissolved into Banzer Suárez's new Nationalist Democratic Action (ADN).
