= Left-wing Revolutionary Nationalist Movement =

The Left-wing Revolutionary Nationalist Movement (Spanish: Movimiento Nacionalista Revolucionario de Izquierda, MNRI) was a centre-left political party in Bolivia.

== History ==
The Left-wing Revolutionary Nationalist Movement was founded by Hernán Siles Zuazo, a leader of the leftist sector of the Nationalist Revolutionary Movement. He had earlier been vice-president (1951), had led a revolution (1952) and had been president (1956–1960); he had been in exile in 1946–1951 and 1964–1978. In 1971, a leader of MNR Víctor Paz Estenssoro supported the far-Right coup triggered by Colonel Hugo Banzer Suárez, and the MNR became officially a member of the regime, along with the party's traditional enemy, the Bolivian Socialist Falange (FSB). Víctor Paz Estenssoro's entry into the pro-Hugo Banzer Nationalist Popular Front with the FSB provoked Hernán Siles Zuazo's formal exit from the party, to form the Nationalist Revolutionary Movement of the Left.

== Values ==
The MNRI sought the establishment of a government "truly representative of workers and peasants"; an end to "fratricidal struggles"; the suppression of the drug trade, and the renegotiation of foreign debt.

== Actions ==
The Left-wing Revolutionary Nationalist Movement was the leading force in the Democratic and Popular Union, formed in April 1978 and including the Revolutionary Left Movement and the Communist Party of Bolivia (PCB), and in mid-1979. In the presidential elections of 1978 Hernán Siles Zuazo, as the UDP candidate, came second with 25.00%, and of 1979 and 1980 he came first with 35.97 and 38.74 per cent, and only the 1980 military coup prevented his inauguration as president. He returned from exile (in Peru) on 8 October 1982, and two days later was confirmed as president by the reconvened Congress.

== Politics ==
The Democratic and Popular Union coalition government was increasingly dominated by the MNRI, with the Revolutionary Left Movement withdrawing its support from January 1983 to April 1984, and again from December 1984; the Communist Party of Bolivia withdrew its backing in November 1984. By 1985 the Hernán Siles Zuazo regime was opposed by the left, the army, the unions and the peasantry, and early elections (in June) revealed the extent of its unpopularity: the MNRI won only 8 seats, as against 57 won by the UDP in 1980, and the MNRI presidential candidate, Roberto Jordan Pando, won only 05.48% votes, coming fourth.

== Splinter groups ==
A split in 1980 established the Leftwing Revolutionary Nationalist Movement – 1; a minor a peasant sector. When Hernán Siles Zuazo became president, splits in the Nationalist Revolutionary Movement of the Left were already very visible. At least three factions were identifiable: the “Palaciego”, which surrounded Hernán Siles Zuazo; the MNRI-Legalista, which in 1983 joined the opposition in National Congress; and the Leftwing Revolutionary Nationalist Movement – 20th Century, a group of technocrats. In the long run the Palaciego and Siglo XX factions prevailed.

== Dispersal ==
Owing to Hernán Siles Zuazo's deteriorating health, the Left-wing Revolutionary Nationalist Movement gradually disappeared. Most of its militants joined other parties, mainly the Revolutionary Left Movement and Revolutionary Nationalist Movement.
