= Barrientista Revolutionary Party =

The Barrientista Revolutionary Party (Spanish: Partido Revolucionario Barrientista, PRB) was a right-wing "Barrientista" political party in Bolivia.

The Barrientista Revolutionary Party was founded by ex-minister of René Barrientos's Government Enrique Gallardo Lozada in April 1978.

In 1978, the Barrientista Revolutionary Party allied with the Christian Democratic Party and its candidate René Bernal Escalante.

In 1979, the Barrientista Revolutionary Party allied with the Bolivian Union Party and its candidate Walter González Valda.

After the coup d'état on 17 July 1980, the Barrientista Revolutionary Party disappeared.
