= Mario Gutiérrez (politician) =

Bolivian falangist political leader

Mário Gutiérrez

Leader of the Bolivian Socialist Falange
- In office 19 April 1959 – 4 August 1980
- Preceded by: Óscar Únzaga de la Vega
- Succeeded by: Gustavo Sejas Revollo

Minister of Foreign Affairs
- In office 22 August 1971 – 26 November 1973
- President: Hugo Banzer Suárez
- Preceded by: Huáscar Taborga Torrico
- Succeeded by: Alberto Guzmán Soriano

Personal details
- Born: Mário R. Gutiérrez Gutiérrez; 17 October 1917 Santa Cruz de la Sierra, Bolivia
- Died: 4 August 1980 (aged 62) Santa Cruz de la Sierra, Bolivia
- Party: Bolivian Socialist Falange
- Parents: Dr. Julio A. Gutiérrez Michelin (father); Luisa Gutiérrez Jimenez (mother)
- Education: Universidad Católica de Chile

Mario R. Gutiérrez Gutiérrez (17 October 1917 – 4 August 1980) was a Bolivian politician who led the Bolivian Socialist Falange (FSB) after the death of its founder, Óscar Únzaga de la Vega, until his death in 1980. He was Foreign Minister from 1971 to 1973 and wrote about Bolivian politics. Born in Santa Cruz de la Sierra in 1917, Gutiérrez studied law and political science at the Catholic University of Chile. After the death of Óscar Vega in a failed coup by the FSB, Gutiérrez, a party member since its creation in 1937, was elected leader of the party by its regional leaders. Gutiérrez was the presidential candidate for the FSB in the 1960 elections, winning 8% of the popular vote. Gutiérrez wrote publications about the political situation in Bolivia and South America.

Gutiérrez is buried on the Paseo de los Notables (Avenue of the Notables) in Santa Cruz General Cemetery.
