= Bolivian Union Party =

Former political party in Bolivia

Bolivian Union Party Partido de la Unión Boliviana
- Leader: Walter Gonzáles Valda
- Colours: yellow

The Bolivian Union Party (Spanish: Partido de la Unión Boliviana) was a political party in Bolivia. The party positioned itself as a 'revolutionary democratic center-left nationalist' party although some authors have described it as a right-wing party. It was founded as a continuation of the Sucrist National Union Party (Partido Unión Nacional Sucrista) and some of its members included police officers who had supported the Bolivian National Revolution of 1952. The party was known for running a number of women as candidates at a time when other Bolivian political parties were male-dominated.

The party ran in the 1979 presidential election, with former police officer Walter Gonzáles Valda as its presidential candidate and the writer and educator Benjamín Saravia Ruela as its vice-presidential candidate. González Valda and Saravia Ruela obtained 18,976 votes (1.29% of the national vote), with most votes coming from Cochabamba, La Paz and Potosi. The party also won a seat in the Chamber of Deputies that year, occupied by Mario Amézaga Antezana.

No candidate received a majority in the election. Eventually, Wálter Guevara was appointed Interim President for a year. However, he was overthrown by a military coup less than three months later.

The following year, the party also participated in the 1980 general elections, with Walter Gonzáles Valda running for president and Norma Vespa de Rivera running for vice president. They received 16,380 votes (1.25% of the total) but won no seats in the government. In 1982, the collective leadership of the party consisted of Walter Gonzáles Valda, Hernán Ichazo Gonzáles, Francisco Silva and Napoléon Calvimontes.
