= Cabinet of Juan Pereda =

General Juan Pereda Asbún assumed the presidency of Bolivia on 21 July 1978, formed his cabinet on 24 July and was removed from office on 3 November.

| Ministry / Date | 24.07.1978 | 04.09.1978 | 06.11.1978 |
|---|---|---|---|
| Foreign and Religious Affaire | Ricardo Anaya Arce, PIR | | |
| Interior, Migration and Justice | Faustino Rico Toro, mil | | |
| National Defense | Ángel Salmón, mil | Wálter Castro Avendaño, mil | |
| Planning and Co-ordination | Raúl Lema Patiño, MNR | | Ronald Mac Lean Abaroa, ind |
| Finance | Jorge Tamayo Ramos, ind | | |
| Education and Culture | Hernando García Vespa, FSB | | Humberto Cayoja Riart, mil |
| Transport, Communications and Aviation | Alfredo Franco Guachalla, MNR | | Fernando Guillén Monje, mil |
| Labor and Union Affairs | Jorge Burgoa Alarcón, ARB | | José Quiroz Antequera, mil |
| Industry, Commerce and Tourism | Edwin Tapia Frontanilla, UNB | | Natalio Morales Mosquera, mil |
| Mining and Metallurgy | Ismael Castro Montaño, ind | | Jorge Echazú Aguirre, mil |
| Energy and Hydrocarbons | Jaime Larrazabal L., ind | | David Fernández Viscarra, mil |
| Agriculture and Peasant Affairs | Guillermo Escobar Uhry, mil | | |
| Health and Social Security | Oscar Román Vaca, ind | | Luis Kuramoto Medina, mil |
| Housing and Urbanism | Gastón Moreira Ostria, FSB | | Lucio Añez Rivera, mil |
| Secretary to the Cabinet | Guillermo Bilbao La Vieja, BRB | | Luis Fernando Valle Quevedo, mil |

MNR – Revolutionary Nationalist Movement

FSB – Bolivian Socialist Falange

PIR – Revolutionary Left Party

UNB – Barrientista National Union

ARB – Barrientista Revolutionary Alliance

BRB – Barrientista Revolutionary Block

mil – military

ind – independent
