= General Cemetery of Santa Cruz =

- Interactive map of General Cemetery of Santa Cruz

Details
- Established: 1826
- Location: Santa Cruz de la Sierra
- Country: Bolivia
- Coordinates: 17°46′53″S 63°10′14″W
- Type: Public
- Find a Grave: General Cemetery of Santa Cruz

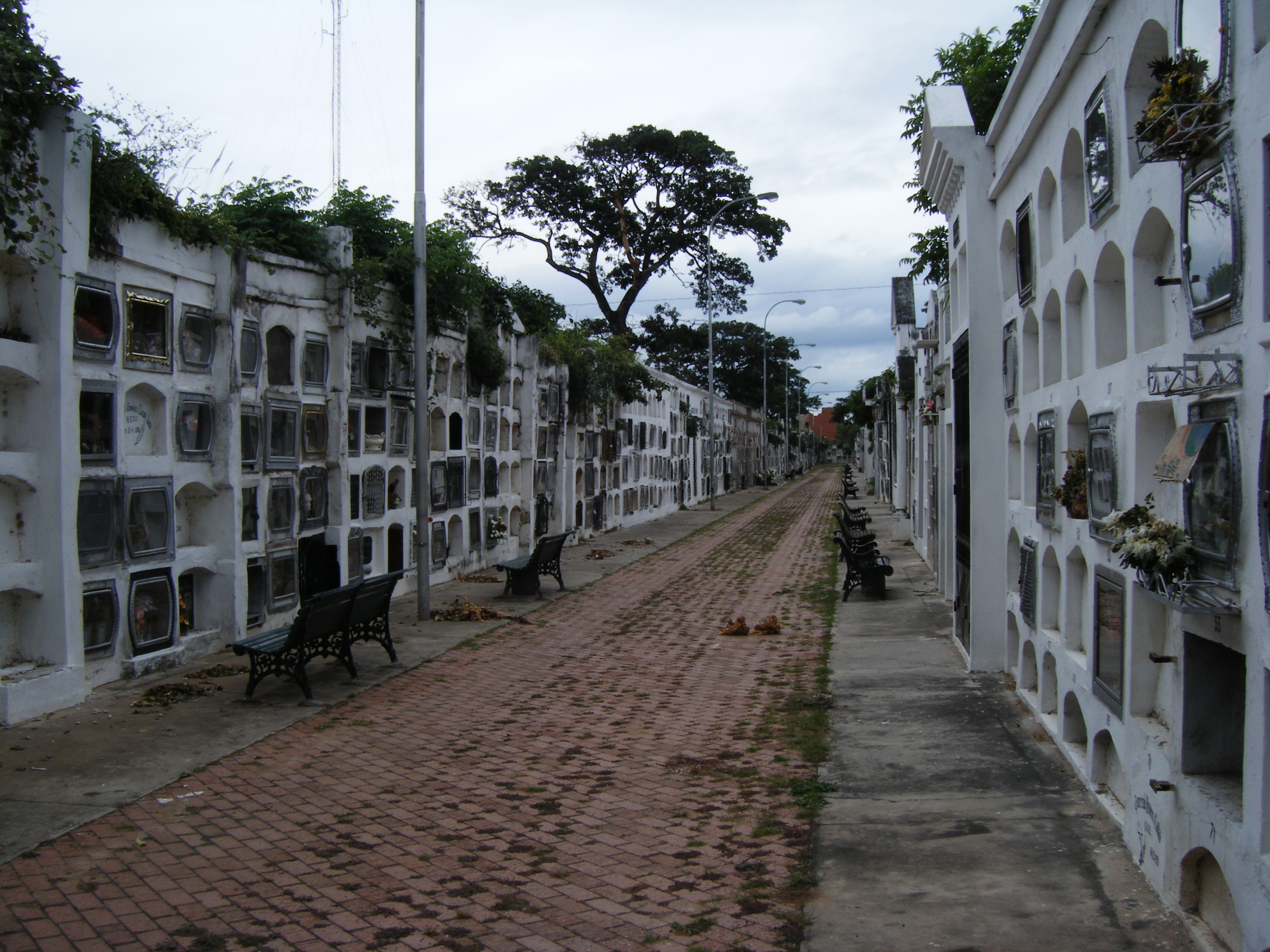
Santa Cruz Cemetery in La Sierra

The General Cemetery of Santa Cruz (Cementerio General de Santa Cruz) is a public cemetery located in Santa Cruz de la Sierra, Bolivia. Located on Viedma Avenue and surrounded by Arenales, Paitití and Salvatierra Streets, it is one of the municipal administration cemeteries.

== History ==
The General Cemetery was established during the presidency of Andrés de Santa Cruz, according to D.S. of 1826, which establishes the implementation of cemeteries throughout Bolivia. It began to be used in 1834 and houses the burial site of Andrés Ibáñez. It was declared a heritage site in 2013.

== Characteristics ==
The General Cemetery is the oldest official cemetery in the city, there are currently close to 50 spaces between regulated and spontaneous settlement established in the city. The General Cemetery stands out for hosting the graves of the first Santa Cruz families as well as for the beauty of its mausoleums, walks and trails.

== Notable interments ==
- Hugo Banzer (1926–2002), military officer and politician, President of Bolivia (1971–1978, 1997–2002)
- Dr. Andrés Ibáñez (1844–1877), politician
