= Democratic Alliance of the National Revolution =

Political alliance in Bolivia

The Democratic Alliance of the National Revolution (Spanish: Alianza Democrática de la Revolución Nacional, ADRN) was a centrist electoral political alliance in Bolivia.

The ADRN was formed in 1978 by the Nationalist Revolutionary Movement, MNR (historical faction led by Víctor Paz Estenssoro) and the Authentic Revolutionary Party, PRA (historical faction led by Wálter Guevara Arce).

It presented as its presidential candidate Paz Estenssoro and Guevara Arce as vice-presidential candidate.
