= Revolutionary Nationalist Movement of the People =

The Nationalist Revolutionary Movement of the People ( Movimiento Nacionalista Revolucionario del Pueblo , MNRP) was founded in April 1965 by Jaime Arellano Castañeda following a split in the Revolutionary Nationalist Movement. The objective of the Nationalist Revolutionary Movement of the People was to fight the right-wing military dictatorship of General René Barrientos Ortuño.

The MNRP was a left nationalist party and was opposed both oligarchism and colonialism, and it advocated the replacement of feudal structures by a progressive system under which natural resources would be exploited mainly by the state and the public sector would be complemented by a true national bourgeoisie. It was advocated an alliance of classes (and not the Marxist idea of class struggle) because the formation of a national state "requires the consensus of all classes"; and relations with all countries according to the national need, and "militant solidarity" with the non-aligned countries of the third world.

The MNRP took part in elections in 1966 backing Mario Díez de Medina and in 1978 backing Jaime Arellano Castañeda.

In 1979 the MNRP reintegrated with historical Revolutionary Nationalist Movement led by Víctor Paz Estenssoro.
