= Hernán Siles Zuazo =

President of Bolivia (1956–1960, 1982–1985)

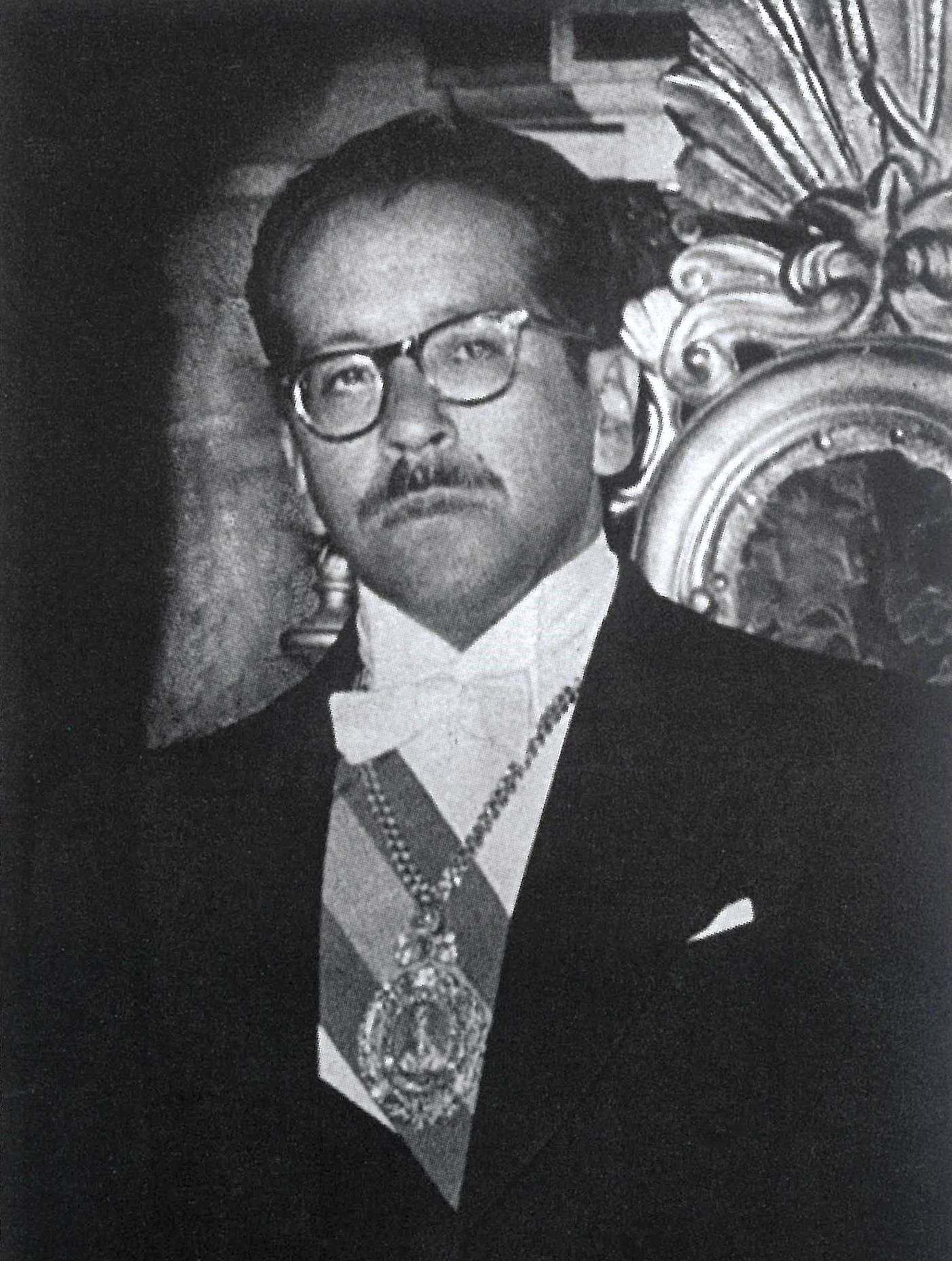

46th President of Bolivia
- In office 10 October 1982 – 6 August 1985
- Vice President: Jaime Paz Zamora (1982–1984); Vacant (1984–1985)
- Preceded by: Guido Vildoso
- Succeeded by: Víctor Paz Estenssoro
- In office 6 August 1956 – 6 August 1960
- Vice President: Ñuflo Chávez Ortiz (1956–1957); Vacant (1957–1960)
- Preceded by: Víctor Paz Estenssoro
- Succeeded by: Víctor Paz Estenssoro
- Interim; 11 April 1952 – 15 April 1952
- Vice President: Vacant
- Preceded by: Hugo Ballivián
- Succeeded by: Víctor Paz Estenssoro

27th Vice President of Bolivia
- In office 15 April 1952 – 6 August 1956
- President: Víctor Paz Estenssoro
- Preceded by: Mamerto Urriolagoitía (1949)
- Succeeded by: Ñuflo Chávez Ortiz

Personal details
- Born: Hernán Siles Zuazo; 21 March 1914 La Paz, Bolivia
- Died: 6 August 1996 (aged 82) Montevideo, Uruguay
- Resting place: La Paz, Bolivia
- Party: Leftwing Revolutionary Nationalist Movement (1971–1985); Revolutionary Nationalist Movement (1942–1971)
- Other political affiliations: Democratic and Popular Union (political alliance)
- Spouse: María Teresa Ormachea (died 2010)
- Children: 3
- Parent: Hernando Siles Reyes (father)
- Relatives: Luis Adolfo Siles Salinas (half-brother)
- Education: Higher University of San Andrés
- Awards: Order of the Condor of the Andes; Order of Merit of the Federal Republic of Germany; Order of Isabella the Catholic

Military service
- Allegiance: Bolivia
- Branch/service: Bolivian Army
- Years of service: 1932–1935
- Unit: 34th Infantry Regiment
- Battles/wars: Chaco War

Hernán Siles Zuazo (Note: In this name that follows Hispanic American naming customs, the first or paternal surname is Siles and the second or maternal family name is Zuazo.) (21 March 1914 – 6 August 1996) was the 46th president of Bolivia, serving from 1956 to 1960 and from 1982 to 1985. He also briefly served as interim president in April 1952, and as the 27th vice president of Bolivia from 1952 to 1956.

== Early life ==
Hernán Siles was the illegitimate son of the last Republican Party president of Bolivia, Hernando Siles Reyes and Isabel Zuazo Cusicanqui. Siles was raised by his mother. His half-brother Luis Adolfo Siles Salinas was president for five months in 1969.

In 1931 Siles graduated from the American Institute in La Paz. He served in Bolivian army and was decorated for injury sustained while fighting in the Chaco War of 1932–1935. After the war he finished at San Andres University with a degree in law.

Siles was married to Maria Teresa Ormachea del Carpio and had three daughters, Marcela, Ana Maria and Isabel.

== Formation of the MNR and the 1952 Revolution ==
In 1940 Siles was elected in the Chamber of Deputies. Gravitating toward the reformist side of the political spectrum (even though his father had been one of the pillars of the Old Regime), in 1941 he founded along with Víctor Paz Estenssoro and others, the influential Revolutionary Nationalist Movement (Movimiento Nacionalista Revolucionario, or MNR).

The MNR was behind the coup that installed the progressive military administration of Gualberto Villarroel (1943–1946), but was forced from power due to U.S. pressure and also by Villarroel's overthrow in 1946 after which Siles was exiled to Argentina. There he worked as a correspondent for the Associated Press from November 1947 until September 1948. In 1949, Siles returned to Bolivia to stand for election to the Bolivian legislature, which he won. However, he was soon arrested for continued agitation against the government in power and was sent to the island prison of Isla de la Luna (Coati) on lake Titicaca. In September 1949, he escaped from the island prison together with a number of fellow political prisoners and, with Bolivian police in hot pursuit, was able to reach Peru, where he was granted political asylum. On 9 October 1949, he returned clandestinely to Bolivia and appeared in the Bolivian congress at his assigned bench, where he demanded his back pay—this public relations coup cemented his image as a leader of the resistance against a tyrannical government.

In the 1951 elections Paz Estenssoro ran for presidency with Siles as his vice-presidential running mate, and won the contest with 42.9% of the vote. However, the ultra-conservative government of Mamerto Urriolagoitía refused to recognize the results and instead turned over the presidency to the commander of the Bolivian army, general Hugo Ballivián. At this point, the MNR party went underground and from 9–11 April 1952 led the historic Bolivian National Revolution, aided by defections from the armed forces to the rebel cause (key among which was general Antonio Seleme). Siles played a major role in the revolutionary uprising, along with Juan Lechín, since the MNR leader Paz Estenssoro was at the time in exile in Argentina.

== Vice President (1952–1956) ==
Having defeated the military and toppled the Ballivián government, Siles served as provisional president from 11 April 1952 until 16 April 1952, when Estenssoro returned from exile. The 1951 electoral results were upheld, and Paz Estenssoro became constitutional president of Bolivia with Siles as his vice-president.

During the MNR's first 4 years in the office, the government instituted far-reaching reforms, including the establishment of the universal vote, nationalization of the largest mining concerns in the country, and the adoption of a major agrarian reform. In 1956 Estenssoro left the office, as the Bolivian Constitution forbade a sitting president from running for another consecutive term. Siles, his logical successor, easily won the elections of 1956 and became President of the Republic on 6 August 1956.

== First presidency (1956–1960) ==
Hernán Siles Zuazo, 1956. National Archives of Brazil.

The first Siles' administration was more contentious and difficult than revolutionary Estenssoro's had been. During this time MNR began to fragment along personal lines and due to growing disagreements over policy.

The economy was in deep trouble, as food and mineral production had plummeted; consequently, inflation soared, and the United States conditioned any further aid and support on the adoption of an economic program of its own prescription (the so-called Eder plan) in late 1956. Siles accepted these conditions, receiving North American aid in return for cutting government expenses and social programs.

Siles also had to tackle the difficult issue of disarming the worker and miner militia members who had fought in the 1952 Revolution and who had been allowed to keep their weapons. They had served as a useful counterbalance to the possibility of a conservative or military coup against the Revolution, but were by now serving the growing ambitions of the head of the Bolivian Workers' Center (COB) Juan Lechín. Meanwhile, the Falange Socialista Boliviana party schemed to topple the MNR from power, causing a rather disproportionate repressive backlash that diminished MNR's (and Siles') popularity.

== Break with the MNR and exile (1960–1978) ==
After the end of Siles' term in 1960, Estenssoro again ran for president in 1960 elections and, upon being elected, sent Siles as ambassador to Uruguay until 1963 and as ambassador to Spain (1963–1964). In 1964 Siles broke with Estrassoro over the latter's decision to run for another consecutive term.

Siles initially supported the November 1964 coup d'état by vice-president, General René Barrientos and army chief Alfredo Ovando—but was later exiled when it became apparent that the military intended to manipulate the 1966 electoral results to perpetuate itself in power. Except for a five-month interlude during which his half-brother held the presidency, the armed forces remained in control of the Presidential Palacio Quemado until 1982.

In 1971 Siles opposed the right-wing coup of general Hugo Banzer, prompting an irreversible break with Estenssoro, who supported the coup. In 1971 Siles formed the Leftwing Revolutionary Nationalist Movement (Movimiento Nacionalista Revolucionario de Izquierda, MNRI), beginning a steady leftwards drift.

== The 1978–1982 democratic false starts ==
After the 1978 democratic opening, Siles returned to Bolivia and formed a grand alliance of the left with the Revolutionary Left Movement, the Communist Party, and others. Together, they formed the Democratic and Popular Union (UDP), which triumphed in the 1978, 1979, and 1980 general elections, mostly as a result of a serious erosion of support for Estenssoro.

The 1978 election was annulled due to massive fraud in favor of the official military candidate, General Juan Pereda, though exit polls showed Siles would have won handily had the election been conducted honestly. The 1979 contest remained inconclusive because no candidate received 50% of the vote, and Congress elected Wálter Guevara a temporary president.

Siles finished first in 1980, but came up short of a majority. Days before Congress was due to convene to choose a winner, the army launched the bloody coup of 17 July 1980, which installed a reactionary (and cocaine-tainted) dictatorship of General Luis García Meza. Siles escaped to exile in Peru by crossing Lake Titicaca on a boat. He returned in 1982, when the military's experiment had run its course and the Bolivian economy was on the verge of collapse.

== Second presidency (1982–1985) ==
With its reputation badly damaged by the excesses of the 1980–1982 dictatorship, the military faced two options—call new elections, or accept the 1980 results. By this time, however, it was obvious that the country would crumble into civil war before new elections could be held. Under the circumstances, the military announced in September 1982 that to spare the expense of new elections and avoid further unrest, it would reconvene the legislature elected in 1980 and accept whomever it chose as president. Congress reconvened on 23 September and reconfirmed the 1980 election results. On 5 October, it overwhelmingly elected Siles as president. He was sworn into his second term on 10 October, with the MIR's Jaime Paz as his vice-president.

In 1983, Siles Zuazo reopened relations with Cuba after the relationship ended twenty years previous. Cuban doctors began reorganizing the Bolivian health system.

On 30 June 1984 he was abducted from his home and held for ten hours during a failed military coup. Sixty members of the army and police force sought to bring about a coup. According to the Bolivian government, members of the elite narcotics unit, the Leopardos, were involved in the abduction. The commanding officer of the unit was arrested.

The economic situation was dire, with growing hyperinflation. Siles had great difficulty in controlling the situation, and received scant support from the political parties or members of Congress, most of whom were eager to flex their political muscles after so many years of military authoritarianism. The unions, led by their old leader Juan Lechín, paralyzed the government with constant strikes, and even the vice-president, Jaime Paz, deserted the sinking ship when Siles' popularity sank to an all-time low.

The 1982–1986 hyperinflation would end up being the fourth-largest ever recorded in the world. Still, Siles refused to adopt extra-constitutional measures, preferring instead to consolidate the hard-earned Bolivian democracy regardless of the personal cost to him. He even went on a hunger strike as a desperate way to gain public sympathy. Finally, he agreed to shorten his own term and Congress moved the presidential election forward by a year.

One bright point in the Siles administration was the 1983 extradition to France of the Nazi war criminal Klaus Barbie, known as the Butcher of Lyon. He had been living in Bolivia since the late 1950s or early 1960s, after being smuggled out of Europe with the assistance of the United States, and was often employed by the 1964–1982 dictatorships as an interrogation specialist. Following his extradition he was condemned for his crimes and died in a French prison.

== Later life ==
By 1985 the government's impotence prompted Congress to call early elections, citing the fact that Siles had been originally elected five long years before. His old rival, MNR's Víctor Paz Estenssoro was elected president, and Siles left for Uruguay, a country where he had lived before in exile and for which he held special affection. He died in Montevideo, Uruguay, in August 1996 at the age of 82.

== See also ==
- UMOPAR
- Second Cabinet of Hernán Siles Zuazo

== Bibliography ==
- Mesa José de; Gisbert, Teresa; and Carlos D. Mesa, "Historia De Bolivia", 3rd edition., pp. 570–674 and 690–701.

Party political offices
Preceded by Juan Lechín	Revolutionary Nationalist Movement nominee for Vice President of Bolivia; 1951	Succeeded by Ñuflo Chávez Ortiz
Preceded by Víctor Paz Estenssoro	Revolutionary Nationalist Movement nominee for President of Bolivia; 1956	Succeeded by Víctor Paz Estenssoro
New political alliance	Democratic and Popular Union nominee for President of Bolivia; 1978, 1979, 1980	Alliance dissolved
Political offices
Preceded by Hugo Ballivián	President of Bolivia; Interim; 1952	Succeeded by Víctor Paz Estenssoro
Vacant Title last held by Mamerto Urriolagoitía	Vice President of Bolivia; 1952–1956	Succeeded by Ñuflo Chávez Ortiz
Preceded by Víctor Paz Estenssoro	President of Bolivia; 1956–1960	Succeeded by Víctor Paz Estenssoro
Preceded by Guido Vildoso	President of Bolivia; 1982–1985	Succeeded by Víctor Paz Estenssoro
