= Democratic and Popular Unity =

Bolivian umbrella political alliance

Democratic and Popular Unity (Spanish: Unidad Democrática y Popular) was a Bolivian umbrella political alliance. It existed from 1977 to 1984. It was formed in 1977 by former president Hernán Siles Zuazo and consisted chiefly of Siles' Movimiento Nationalista Revolutionario de Izquierda (Leftwing Revolutionary Nationalist Movement), a spin-off of the Moviminento Nacionalista Revolucionario (Revolutionary Nationalist Movement), and Jaime Paz Zamora's Movimiento de Izquierda Revolucionaria (Revolutionary Left Movement). The coalition emerged as a major political force and gained support with Bolivian voters in the late 1970s, due to public dissatisfaction with the military dictatorships that had ruled Bolivia since 1964.

== History ==
The UDP presented itself for elections in 1978, with Siles Zuazo at the head of the ticket. The party won a plurality of the vote, however, due to the discovery of massive fraud on behalf of the government endorsed candidate, General Juan Pereda. New elections were conducted in 1979. They, too, proved inconclusive, as the UDP's Hernán Siles Zuazo, with Paz Zamora as his vice-presidential running mate, finished first at the ballot box, but without attaining the 50% majority necessary for direct election. Thus, it was left to Congress to determine the next Chief Executive, as stipulated in the Bolivian Constitution. Congress could not agree on any candidate, no matter how many votes were taken. Eventually, Congress proclaimed as temporary President the head of the Senate, Dr. Wálter Guevara, pending the calling of yet a new round of elections in 1980.

During the 1980 elections, the ultra-right wing of the Bolivian military began to intimate that it would never stand for the installation in the Palacio Quemado of the "extremist" Siles and Paz Zamora. In April, the small rented plane in which Paz Zamora and a delegation of UDP politicians were traveling crashed in the Altiplano near La Paz, with the resulting death of all on board except the vice-presidential candidate. No evidence to prove that it was an assassination attempt. In any case, Paz recovered from his wounds and resumed campaigning, buoyed by the increasing support received by the UDP. The winner of this third vote in three years was, yet again, the Siles Zuazo-Paz Zamora formula. The two would have been sworn in, weren't for the July 17, 1980, coup of General Luis García Meza, which disrupting the democratic process.

Siles Zuazo and Paz Zamora fled to exile, but returned in 1982, when the military's experiment had run its course and the Bolivian economy was on the verge of collapse. In October 1982 the results of the 1980 elections were upheld and Siles Zuazo was sworn in, with Paz Zamora as his vice-president. The negative economic situation induced a galloping hyper-inflationary process developed. Siles, and the UDP government had difficulty in controlling the situation. In all fairness, the ruling coalition received scant support from the other political parties or members of congress, most of whom were eager to flex their newly acquired political muscles after so many years of authoritarianism. The unions, led by the old firebrand Juan Lechín paralyzed the government with constant strikes. At this point, the MIR (led by Paz Zamora) disassociated itself from the regime (1984), withdrew from the ruling coalition when Siles' popularity sank to an all-time low. For all purposes, the UDP ceased to exist at that point.

By 1985, the government's impotence prompted Congress to call early elections, citing the fact that Siles had been originally elected five long before. With the UDP having splintered completely, Siles retired but his MNR-I party ran in the 1985 elections under the leadership of Roberto Jordán Pando. It performed poorly at the polls. As for the MIR (the UDP's other main component group), it ran in the 1985 elections under its own name and finished third. Its leader, Paz Zamora, went on to be elected president in 1989. The UDP was never resuscitated again, but it played a significant role in Bolivia's democratic transition between 1977 and 1984.
