= Juan Pereda =

52nd President of Bolivia

- Official photograph, 1978

52nd President of Bolivia
- In office 21 July 1978 – 24 November 1978
- Vice President: Vacant
- Preceded by: Hugo Banzer
- Succeeded by: David Padilla

Minister of Interior, Migration, and Justice
- In office 14 February 1974 – 28 November 1977
- President: Hugo Banzer
- Preceded by: Walter Castro Avendaño
- Succeeded by: Guillermo Jiménez Gallo

Minister of Industry, Commerce, and Tourism
- In office 10 September 1973 – 14 February 1974
- President: Hugo Banzer
- Preceded by: Héctor Ormachea Peñaranda
- Succeeded by: Miguel Ayoroa Montaño

Personal details
- Born: Juan Pereda Asbún; 17 June 1931 La Paz, Bolivia
- Died: 25 November 2012 (aged 81) Santa Cruz, Bolivia
- Party: Independent
- Other political affiliations: Nationalist Union of the People (political alliance)
- Spouse: Norma Ballivián
- Parent(s): Marcos Pereda; María Luisa Asbún
- Education: Military Aviation College

Military service
- Allegiance: Bolivia
- Branch/service: Bolivian Air Force
- Rank: General

Juan Pereda Asbún (17 June 1931 – 25 November 2012) was a Bolivian military general who served as the 52nd president of Bolivia in 1978. He ruled for only four months and his ascent to the presidency marked the beginning of the most unstable period in Bolivian history, with nine presidents in a little over 4 years (1978–1982), in comparison to only one in the previous seven.

Juan Pereda was born in La Paz on 17 June 1931. His father was from a family of merchants and his mother was from a wealthy family of Palestinian Christians. Pereda joined the Bolivian armed forces, later becoming part of its nascent Air Force. He led the Military Aviation School and was subsequently appointed Air Force Commander. He served in the dictatorship of Hugo Banzer (1971–1978) as Minister of Industry and, in the late 1970s, as Minister of Interior, perhaps the most powerful post in the regime after Banzer himself.

When in 1978 the then-dictator decided to call elections after seven years in power, he chose Pereda to run as his surrogate. At the time, Bolivian presidents were barred from immediate re-election. It was assumed that Pereda would be elected with the "help" of a rigged election, rule for four years, and then allow Banzer to return as constitutional president once he had time to polish up his image and transition to civilian politics. Apparently, Banzer had second thoughts, for by election time the left-wing UDP coalition of former president Hernán Siles was out to a massive lead in the polls, and no amount of rigging could have denied it.

Pereda ran as the candidate of the Nationalist Union of the People, a right-wing alliance. Official results showed Pereda winning with just over 50 percent of the vote, a few thousand votes over the threshold for an outright victory. However, protests paralyzed the country and independent organizations agreed that all exit polls indicated Siles had won handily—a result quite different from what was being purported. Additionally, the official results showed that some 200,000 more votes were cast than registered voters. At this point, Banzer annulled the elections, denounced the electoral fraud, and disassociated himself from it altogether, basically blaming Pereda and his closest supporters. He declared he would call elections again within a year or two.

Banzer reckoned without Pereda, however, who felt used by Banzer as a tool to remain in power. He launched a coup d'état, with the support of many military officers who felt Banzer manipulated the armed forces for his own political ends. After Banzer was forced to leave the Palacio Quemado in July 1978, Pereda was sworn in as president, although not a constitutional one, since the fraud had been so conspicuous that it was plain to see. He did blame Banzer, however, and stated non-commitally that he would call new elections within a reasonable span of time. His lack of clarity in this regard, and his obvious paucity of a coherent government program, proved to be his undoing. After four months in office, General Pereda was overthrown by democratically oriented officers under the leadership of General David Padilla. Feeling betrayed by everyone (from Banzer to his co-conspirators in the July 1978 coup d'état), at that point Pereda withdrew from public life and never again participated in politics.

== See also ==
- Cabinet of Juan Pereda

Military offices
Preceded by Luis Garcia Pereira	Commander General of the Bolivian Air Force; 1977	Succeeded by José Sempértegui Rocabado
Political offices
Preceded by Héctor Ormachea Peñaranda	Minister of Industry, Commerce, and Tourism; 1973–1974	Succeeded by Miguel Ayoroa Montaño
Preceded by Walter Castro Avendaño	Minister of Interior, Migration, and Justice; 1974–1977	Succeeded by Guillermo Jiménez Gallo
Vacant Government Junta Title last held by Hugo Banzer	President of Bolivia; 1978	Succeeded by David Padilla
Party political offices
Preceded by New political alliance	Nationalist Union of the People nominee for President of Bolivia; 1978	Succeeded by Alliance dissolved
