= Palacio Quemado =

Former official residence of the President of Bolivia

Coordinates: 16°29′45″S 68°08′01″W

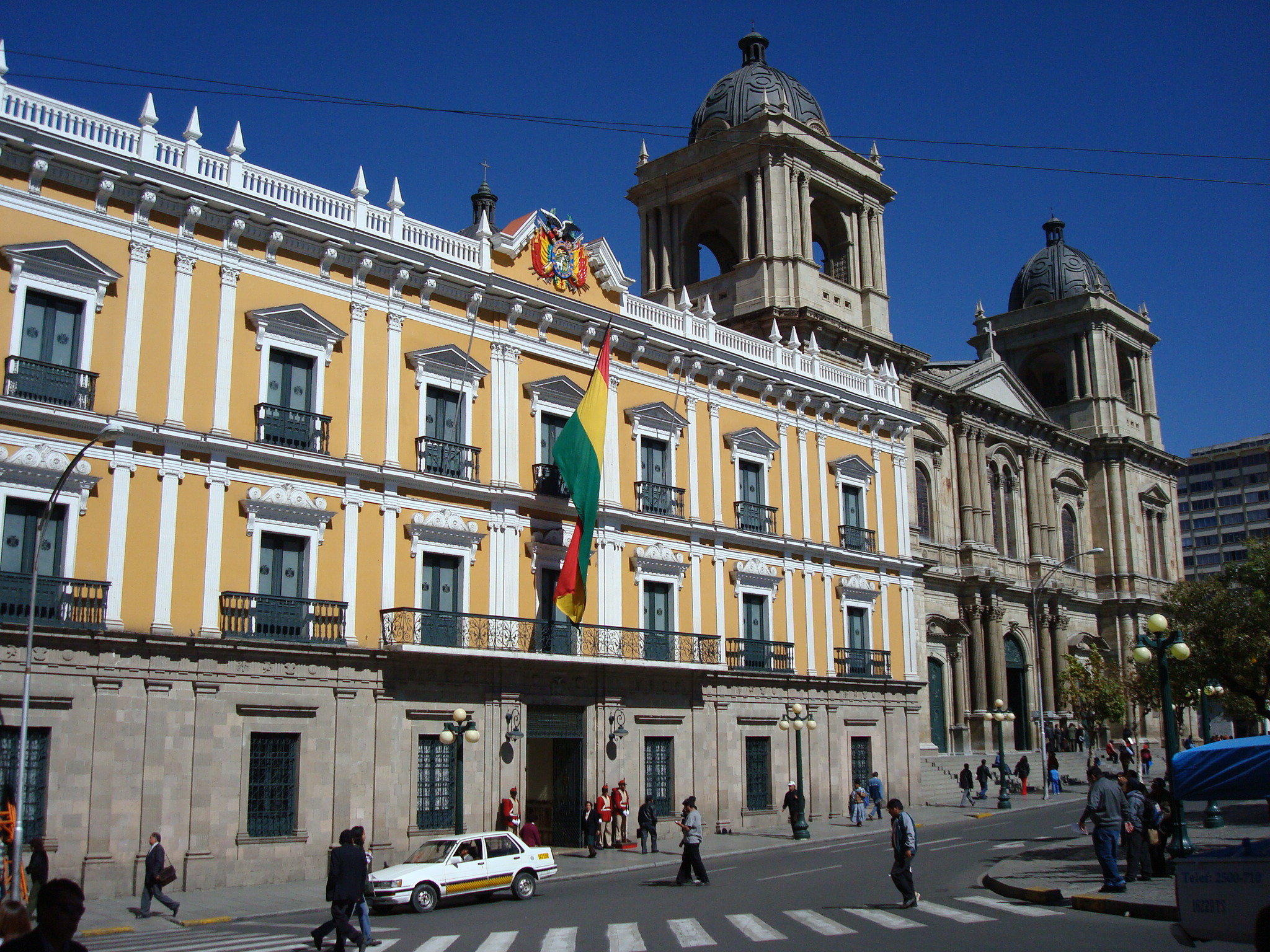
The Palacio Quemado, La Paz

The Bolivian Palace of Government, better known as Palacio Quemado (Spanish: [paˈlasjo keˈmaðo], Burnt Palace), was the official residence of the President of Bolivia from 1853 to 2018 and again briefly from 2019 to 2020. It is located in downtown La Paz on Plaza Murillo, next to the La Paz Cathedral and across from the Bolivian legislature. On 9 August 2018, it was replaced by the Casa Grande del Pueblo as the residence of the president by President Evo Morales. The interim government of Jeanine Áñez briefly reverted to occupying the Palacio Quemado from 2019 until 2020 when the newly elected Luis Arce returned to using the Casa Grande. It now serves as a museum.

Its nickname originates from the fact that it was set aflame and burned almost to the ground during an uprising in 1875. It has since been rebuilt and redecorated a number of times, but the name stuck.

== History ==
The Palacio Quemado earned its nickname of the "Burnt Palace" in 1875, when it was badly damaged during a violent revolution. Rebels, who opposed then-President Tomás Frías, set the palace alight after they failed to storm it.

In front of the Palacio Quemado is the bust of former President Gualberto Villarroel, who was dragged into the plaza by an angry mob and hanged from a lamppost in 1946.

== Buildings ==
The buildings were completed in 1853.
