= Hugo Banzer =

President of Bolivia (1971–1978; 1997–2001)

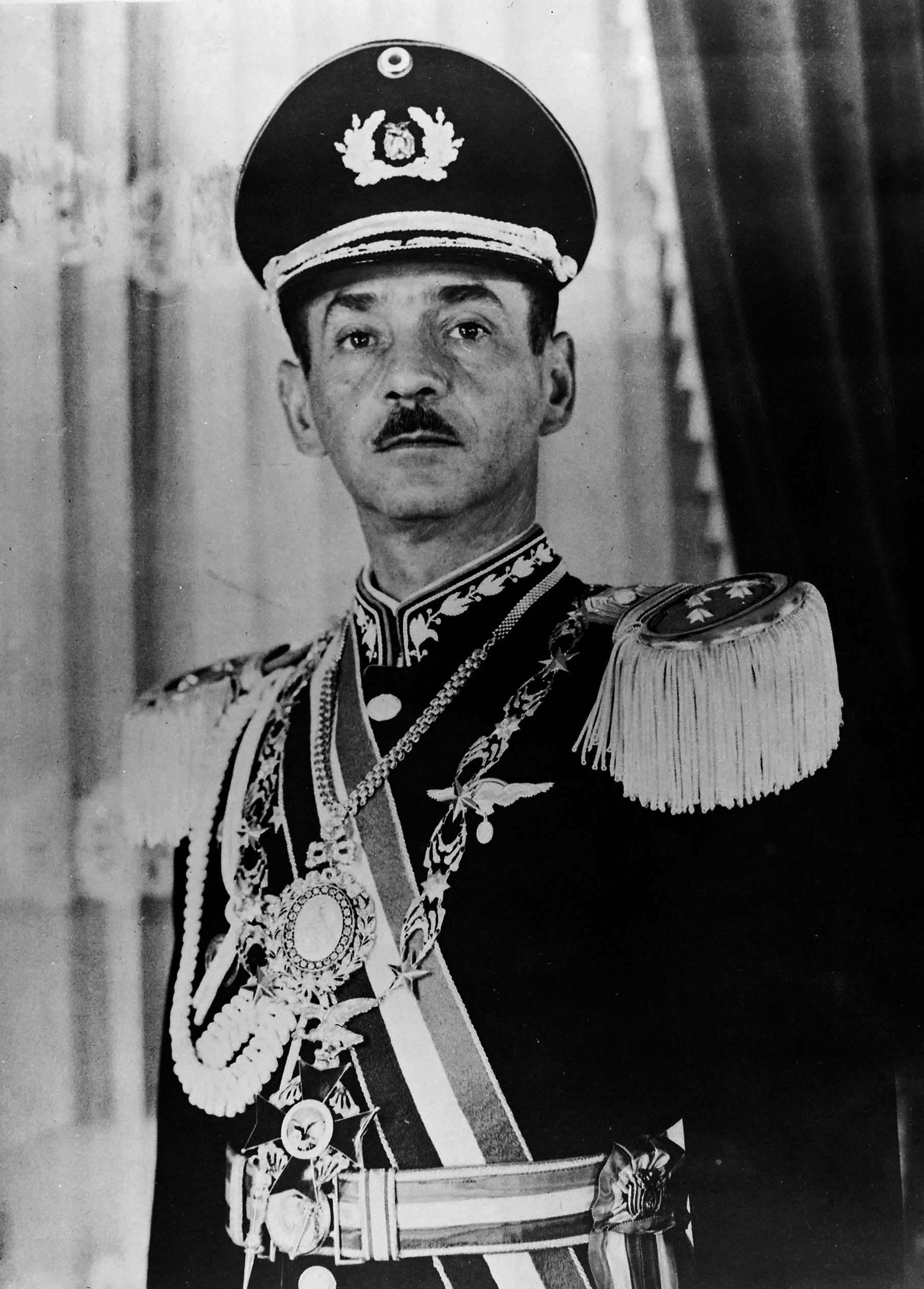
- Official portrait, 1971

51st President of Bolivia
- In office 6 August 1997 – 7 August 2001
- Vice President: Jorge Quiroga
- Preceded by: Gonzalo Sánchez de Lozada
- Succeeded by: Jorge Quiroga
- In office 21 August 1971 – 21 July 1978
- Vice President: Vacant
- Preceded by: Juan José Torres
- Succeeded by: Juan Pereda

Minister of Education and Culture
- In office 5 November 1964 – 6 August 1966
- President: René Barrientos; Alfredo Ovando
- Preceded by: Carlos Serrate
- Succeeded by: Edgar Ortiz Lema

Personal details
- Born: Hugo Banzer Suárez; 10 May 1926 Concepción, Santa Cruz, Republic of Bolivia
- Died: 5 May 2002 (aged 75) Santa Cruz, Republic of Bolivia
- Party: Nationalist Democratic Action
- Other political affiliations: Nationalist Popular Front
- Spouse: Yolanda Prada
- Children: 5
- Parent(s): César Banzer; Luisa Suárez
- Education: Military College of the Army; Armored Cavalry School; School of the Americas
- Awards: Order of the Condor of the Andes; Order of Isabella the Catholic; Order of the Sun of Peru

Military service
- Allegiance: Bolivia
- Branch/service: Bolivian Army
- Years of service: 1952–1978
- Rank: General

Hugo Banzer (Note: In Spanish orthography, Banzer should be spelled Bánzer, but because Banzer is originally a German name, it is left intact.) Suárez (Spanish pronunciation: [ˈuɣo ˈβanseɾ ˈswaɾes]; 10 May 1926 – 5 May 2002) was a Bolivian politician and military officer who served as the 51st president of Bolivia. He held the Bolivian presidency twice: from 1971 to 1978 as a military dictator, and then again from 1997 to 2001, as a democratically elected president.

Banzer rose to power via a US-backed coup d'état against socialist president Juan José Torres and repressed labor leaders, clergymen, indigenous people, and students during his 1971–1978 dictatorship. Several thousand Bolivians were either forced to seek asylum in foreign countries, arrested, tortured, or killed during this period, known as the Banzerato.

After Banzer's removal via a coup led by Juan Pereda, he remained an influential figure in Bolivian politics, and would run for election to the presidency via the ballot box on several occasions, eventually succeeding in 1997 via a narrow plurality of 22.26% of the popular vote. During Banzer's constitutional term, he extended presidential term limits from four years to five, and presided over the Cochabamba Water War, declaring a state of siege in 2000 that suspended several civil liberties and led to violent clashes between demonstrators and law enforcement. After being diagnosed with lung cancer, Banzer resigned in 2001 and was succeeded by Vice President Jorge Quiroga.

== Early life ==
Hugo Banzer Suárez was born on 10 May 1926 in the hacienda Concepción, Santa Cruz, son of César Banzer Aliaga and María Luisa Suárez Justiniano. His grandfather, Georg Banzer, was a German immigrant originally from Osnabrück.

Banzer studied at Colégio Seminario Ovidio Santisteban, and high school at Colegio Nacional Florida. At the age of 14 in 1941, Banzer entered the Army Military College, graduating with the rank of second lieutenant in 1947. During his time at the institution, he stood out for as one of the best cadets in the academic field. Banzer's military vocation would have originated after meeting Germán Busch by chance at the age of ten.

During his military training, Banzer was trained in institutions from different countries, such as the Military College of the Nation in Argentina, the Armored Cavalry School at Fort Hood in the United States and the School of the Americas in Panama, the latter being the alma mater of South American police and military recognized for their crimes against humanity, such as Manuel Contreras, Manuel Noriega, Leopoldo Galtieri and Roberto Eduardo Viola.

== Military and ideological formation ==
Banzer was promoted to colonel in 1961. In 1963, he was briefly a military attaché at the Embassy of Bolivia in the United States. From 1964 to 1966, Banzer served as head the Ministry of Education and Culture in the government of General René Barrientos, a personal friend. From 1967 to 1969, he was military attaché at the Embassy of Bolivia in Argentina. From 1969 to 1971, Banzer was director of the Military Academy, appointed during the presidency of General Alfredo Ovando. In 1970, he was also director of the Coronel Gualberto Villarroel Military School. Banzer became increasingly involved in politics, siding with the right wing of the Bolivian Army.

== As plotter (1970–1971) ==
In 1970, President Juan José Torres was leading the country in a leftist direction, arousing the ire and mistrust of conservative anti-communist circles in Bolivia and, crucially, in the Nixon administration. He had called an Asamblea del Pueblo, or People's Assembly, in which representatives of specific "proletarian" sectors of society were represented (miners, unionized teachers, students, peasants). The Assembly was imbued with all the powers of a working parliament, even though the right-wing opponents of the regime tended to call it a gathering of virtual soviets. Torres also allowed labor leader, Juan Lechín, to resume his post as head of the Central Obrera Boliviana/Bolivian Workers' Union (COB). These measures, coupled with Ovando's earlier nationalization of Gulf Oil properties, angered his opponents even more, chief among whom was Banzer and his US supporters. In early 1971, a faction of the Bolivian military attempted to unseat the new president but failed, whereupon Banzer fled to Argentina, but did not give up his ambitions to the presidency.

== Dictatorship (1971–1978) ==
On 17 August 1971, Banzer, at long last, masterminded a successful military uprising that erupted in Santa Cruz de la Sierra, where he had many supporters. Eventually, the plotters gained control over the La Paz garrisons, although not without considerable bloodshed. The combined levels of United States and Brazilian involvement for the coup d'état have been debated, but according to Stephen Zunes, it is apparent that significant clandestine financial and advisory assistance existed at a critical level within the Nixon administration for Banzer.

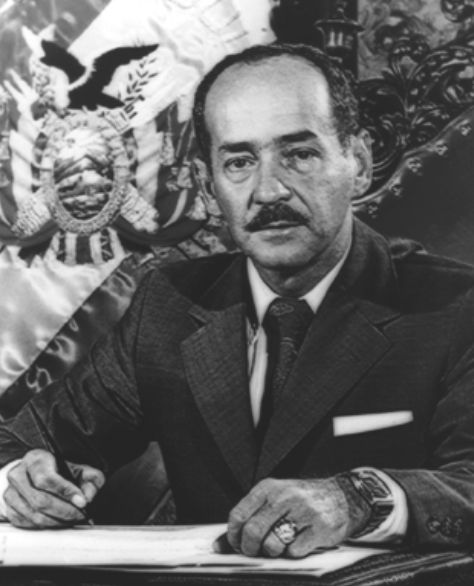
Banzer in 1971

With such backing secured, Banzer emerged as the strong man of the new regime, and, on 22 August, was given full power as president. Conversely, President Juan José Torres was forced to take refuge in Buenos Aires, Argentina, where five years later he was kidnapped and assassinated by right-wing death squads associated with the Videla government and the acquiescence of Banzer. His murder was part of Operation Condor. Banzer received the political support of the center-right Movimiento Nacionalista Revolucionario (MNR) of former president Víctor Paz Estenssoro and the conservative Falange Socialista Boliviana of Mario Gutiérrez, considered to be the two largest parties in the country. For the next seven years, and with the rank of army general, he ruled Bolivia as dictator.

Frustrated by the political divisions and protests that characterized the Torres and Ovando years, and, traditionally an enemy of dissent and freedom of speech, Banzer banned all the left-leaning parties, suspended the powerful Central Obrera Boliviana, and closed the nation's universities. "Order" was now the paramount aim, and no means were spared to restore authority and stifle dissent. Buoyed by the initial legitimacy provided by Paz and Gutierrez's support, the dictator ruled with a measure of civilian support until 1974, when the main parties realized he did not intend to hold elections, instead using them to perpetuate himself in power. At that point, Banzer dispensed with all pretenses and banned all political activity, exiled all major leaders (Paz Estenssoro included), and proceeded to rule henceforth solely with military support.

Human rights groups claim that during Banzer's 1971–1978 tenure (known as the Banzerato) several thousand Bolivians sought asylum in foreign countries, 3,000 political opponents were arrested, 200 were killed, and many more were tortured. In the basement of the Ministry of the Interior or "the horror chambers" around 2,000 political prisoners were held and tortured during the 1971–1978 military rule. Many others simply disappeared. Among the victims of the regime were Colonel Andrés Selich, Banzer's first Minister of the Interior and co-conspirator in the August 1971 coup. Selich was accused of plotting to overthrow Banzer and died of blows sustained while in custody. Two other leaders with sufficient stature to potentially eclipse the dictator were murdered under suspicious circumstances while in exile: General Joanquin Zenteno Anaya and former president Juan José Torres, both in 1976. Klaus Barbie, former head of the Gestapo de Lyon, was integrated into the special services in order to "renew" repression techniques and received Bolivian nationality. During the Banzer government, drug trafficking experienced an unprecedented expansion that lasted until the 1980s.

Much of the stability achieved by the Banzerato was sustained by the constant flow of easy credit from abroad, which was often used on mammoth "white elephant" projects of dubious usefulness, which nonetheless impressed certain sectors of the population. The loans would soon raise Bolivia's external debt to record levels, but proved useful in the manipulation of political patronage. In 1975, Banzer restored diplomatic relations with Chile, broken since 1962, with an eye toward obtaining an access to the Pacific Ocean, denied to Bolivia since the loss of its maritime coast in the 19th-century War of the Pacific. The Chilean dictator Augusto Pinochet offered a narrow outlet just north of the port of Arica, on the border with Peru, on lands that had previously belonged to that country. According to the terms of the treaty that handed that territory to Chile, Peru had to agree to any proposal of transferring that land to a third party. Peru refused to accept the Pinochet proposal, instead creating its own counter-proposal, which declared Arica and its waters an area of joint-sovereignty between the three nations. Chile refused this proposal, and talks with Bolivia ended. Diplomatic relations were once again frozen in 1978.

=== Democratic opening of 1978 and toppling ===
In 1978, Banzer, under pressure from the Carter administration, instituted a carefully regulated "democratic opening" for Bolivia. Restricted amnesty was declared, and the country prepared for democratic elections. Since the constitution did not allow a sitting president to succeed himself, Banzer initially endorsed General Juan Pereda as the regime's candidate. It was assumed that Pereda would be elected with government "help" at the polls, rule for four years, and then allow Banzer to return as constitutional president once he had time to polish his image and transition to civilian politics. However, by election time, the popularity of the left-wing coalition of former president Hernán Siles was such that nothing could disguise it.

Nonetheless, the elections of 9 July were rigged. Official results showed Pereda not only far ahead of Siles, but just a few thousand votes over the threshold to win the presidency outright. However, massive protests brought the country to a halt, and independent organizations agreed that all exit polls indicated that Siles had actually won handily. It later emerged that some 200,000 more votes were cast than the total number of registered voters.

With the evidence of irregularities too great to ignore, Banzer had the Electoral Court annul the elections. He denounced the electoral fraud, blaming it on Pereda and his supporters. He declared he would call fresh elections within a year or two.

However, Pereda and other officers felt Banzer was once again manipulating them for his own political ends. They overthrew Banzer in a coup on 21 July. Pereda blamed Banzer for the fraud, and promised to call elections in the future, though he did not specify a time frame. Pereda, in turn, was overthrown in November 1978 by democratically oriented officers under General David Padilla, who, embarrassed by the events of the last few months, and suspecting that Pereda did not intend to call new elections either, promptly set a firm date for a return to civilian rule.

== Civilian political leader ==
Upon leaving office, Banzer formed the ADN party (Acción Democrática Nacionalista), a large organization that attracted most conservative groups under his leadership. Banzer ran for elections in 1979 and 1980, obtaining third place in both contests. The 1979 contest remained inconclusive because, with no candidate having received the necessary 50% of the vote, Congress had to determine the president. The legislature would have likely picked Siles, had it not been for the coup of 17 July 1980 which installed a reactionary (and cocaine-tainted) dictatorship led by General Luis García Meza. With the military's reputation badly damaged by the excesses of the 1980–1982 dictatorship, it was decided to accept the 1980 election results and reconvene the Congress elected that year. That body duly elected Siles as president.

Banzer bitterly opposed the UDP government of Siles which lasted from 1982 to 1985, but turned more conciliatory when Víctor Paz Estenssoro was elected president (by congress, due to the virtual unattainability of the 50% necessary for direct election) in 1985. Indeed, Banzer's party claimed authorship of some of the most prominent neoliberal economic reforms instituted by Paz to curb galloping hyperinflation, repress the influence of labor unions, and generally reduce government control of the economy.

Banzer finished second in the 1989 elections closely behind the MNR's Gonzalo Sánchez de Lozada, and ahead of the centre-left Revolutionary Left Movement's Jaime Paz Zamora. Until the 1989 election, Banzer and Paz Zamora had been staunch political enemies, but driven by a shared disdain for the MNR, they came to a deal. Banzer and the ADN agreed to vote in congress for Paz Zamora to become president, in return for Paz Zamora's promise to support Banzer in a future election.

At the 1993 election Banzer once again finished second to the MNR and Sánchez de Lozada. The MNRs plurality, in coalition with the small center-left Bolivia Libre party, made it possible to confirm the MNR's electoral victory. In the 1997 elections, however, Banzer finished first by a small plurality, and was able to take the presidency with the support of Paz and others in a grand coalition ranging from Paz' Revolutionary Left Movement to Banzer's ADN on the right.

== As constitutional president (1997–2001) ==
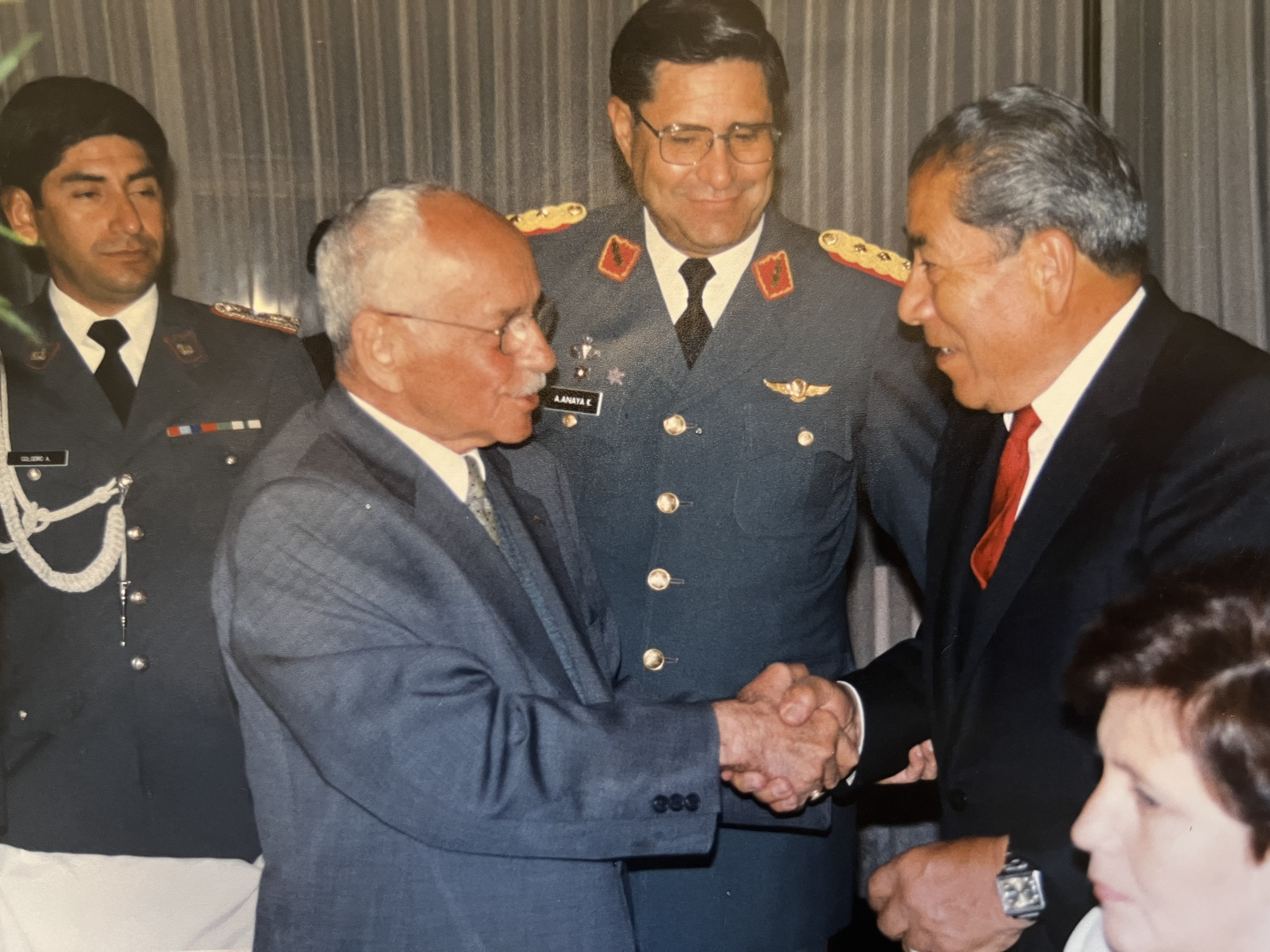
Banzer (left) shaking hands with Hernán Terrazas, 1997

In 1997, Banzer finally achieved democratic election as president of Bolivia, at the age of 71. He was the first former dictator in Latin America's recent history to transition successfully to democratic politics and return to power by way of the ballot box. During his tenure he launched – under the guidelines outlined by the United States – a program to fight drug-trafficking in Bolivia which called for the eradication of coca, a controversial strategy. During his tenure a bitter divide developed within the ADN between Banzer and his vice president Jorge Quiroga. Banzer's faction, known as the dinosaurios, comprised the party's old guard, and its members were less ideologically inclined, being mostly concerned with holding power and preserving Banzer's historical reputation. In contrast, Quiroga's pitufos faction was made up of technocratic free-market hardliners, and was far more willing to use force against protestors than the dinosaurios. Relations between Banzer and Quiroga soon broke down, causing frequent chaos within the cabinet.

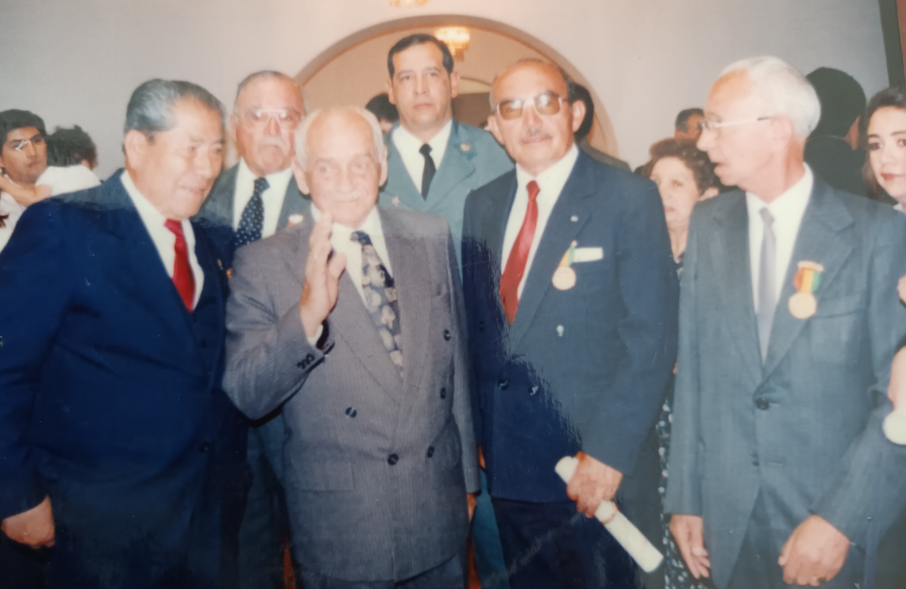
Members of the Military College of La Paz class of 1947 celebrating their golden jubilee. Left to right: General Hernán Terrazas Céspedes, Constitutional President Banzer, Admiral José Vargas, and Major Mario Villavicencio.

Banzer was the president during the Cochabamba Water War in 2000, which centered on the privatization of the water works of Bolivia's third largest city, Cochabamba. In 1999, the World Bank discouraged water subsidies, writing "... no subsidies should be given to ameliorate the increase in water tariffs in Cochabamba." However, that year, in Cochabamba, a water contract was awarded to Aguas del Tunari, a subsidiary of Bechtel (a U.S. company) and the only bidder, for $2.5 billion. According to a report from Historic.ly, "The federal congress did this without consideration of the pueblo or the autonomy of the indigenous people who lived there." After one month of the contract, Bechtel raised the water rates over 60%. Local people could not collect rainwater either, as the rights to rainwater had also been given to the company. By January 2000, protests erupted in Bolivia in response to the privatization of water. Violence occurred when police and demonstrators clashed. Banzer then declared a "state of siege". When officials of the consortium who had bought the right to run the water works fled after being told by the authorities that their safety could not be guaranteed, the Banzer government declared that it had abandoned the project in April 2000, declared the contract void, and settled with the demonstrators.

Banzer was diagnosed with lung cancer in June 2001 by doctors at the Walter Reed Army Medical Center in Washington DC, and even though he had a year left of his five-year term (he had himself agitated to legally extend the presidential term), he resigned on 7 August. He was succeeded by Vice President Jorge Quiroga.

== Death ==
Following his cancer diagnosis, Banzer underwent chemotherapy in Washington DC before returning to Bolivia to spend his final days. After slipping into a coma for several weeks, Banzer died of heart failure induced by lung cancer at his residence in Santa Cruz de la Sierra on 5 May 2002, aged 75, five days before he would have turned 76 and around two months before his original presidential term ended. He was buried at the General Cemetery of Santa Cruz.

== See also ==
- First Cabinet of Hugo Banzer

== Sources ==
- Prado Salmón, Gral. Gary. "Poder y Fuerzas Armadas, 1949-1982."

Political offices
Preceded by Carlos Serrate	Minister of Education and Culture; 1965–1966	Succeeded by Edgar Ortiz Lema
Preceded by Juan José Torres	President of Bolivia; 1971–1978	Vacant Government Junta Title next held by Juan Pereda
Preceded by Gonzalo Sánchez de Lozada	President of Bolivia; 1997–2001	Succeeded by Jorge Quiroga
Party political offices
New political party	Nationalist Democratic Action nominee for President of Bolivia; 1979, 1980, 1985, 1989, 1997	Succeeded by Ronald MacLean Abaroa
New political alliance	Patriotic Accord nominee for President of Bolivia; 1993	Alliance dissolved
