= 1985 Bolivian general election =

- Registered: 2,108,458
- Turnout: 81.97% (▲7.65pp)
- Presidential election
- 14 July 1985 (popular vote) 6 August 1985 (Congress vote)
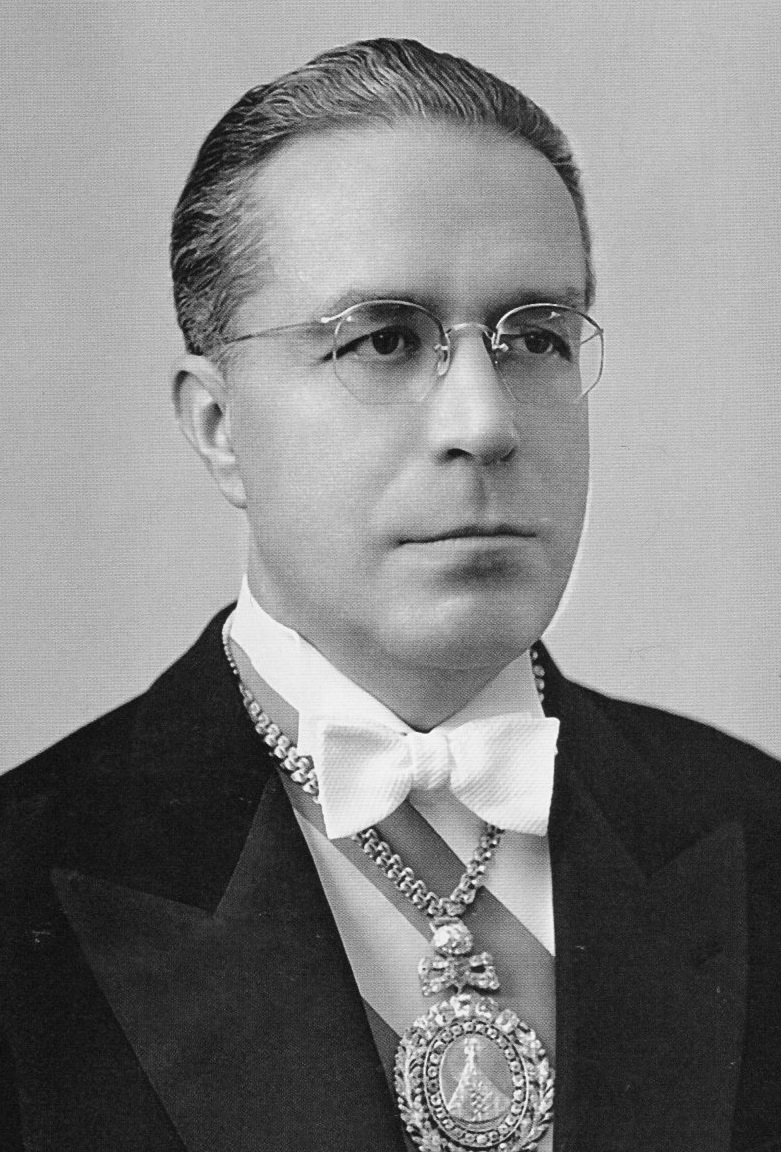

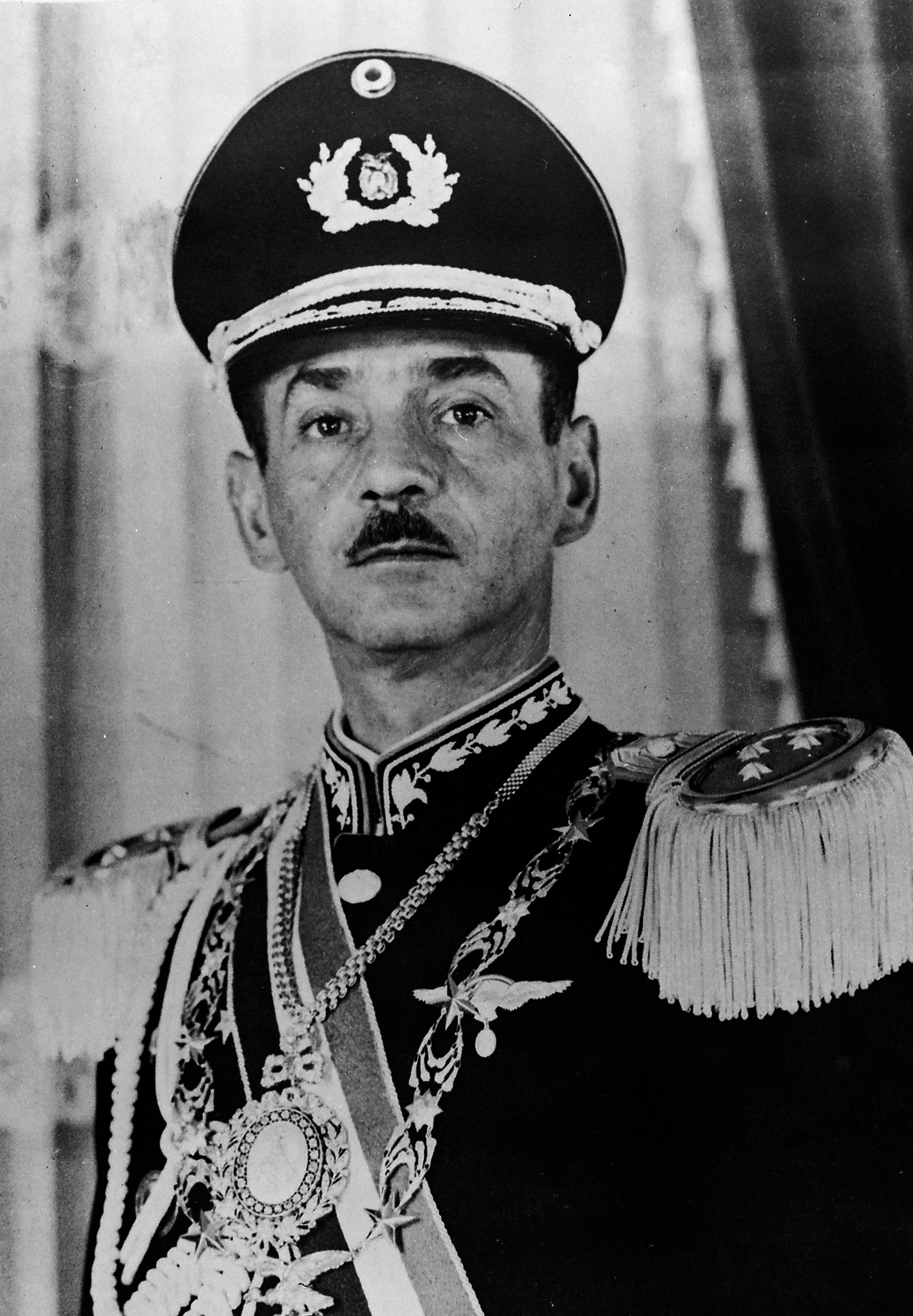

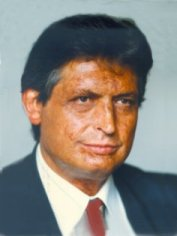
Nominee	Víctor Paz Estenssoro	Hugo Banzer
Party	MNR	ADN
Running mate	Julio Garret Ayllón	Eudoro Galindo
Electoral vote	94	51
Popular vote	456,704	493,735
Percentage	30.36%	32.83%
Nominee	Jaime Paz Zamora	Roberto Jordán Pando
Party	MIR	MNRI
Running mate	Oscar Eid Franco	Marcelo Velarde Ortiz
Popular vote	153,143	82,418
Percentage	10.18%	5.48%
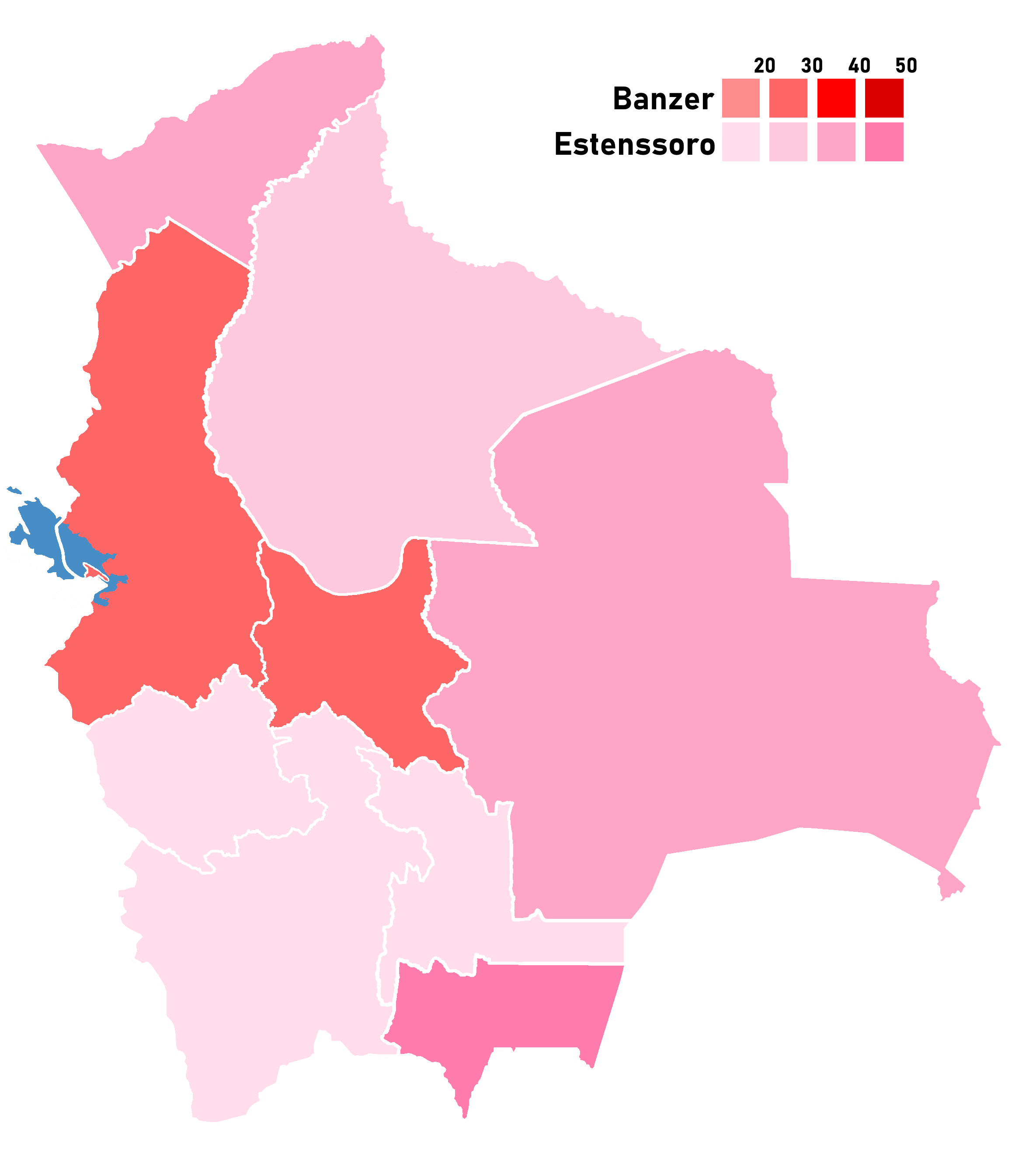
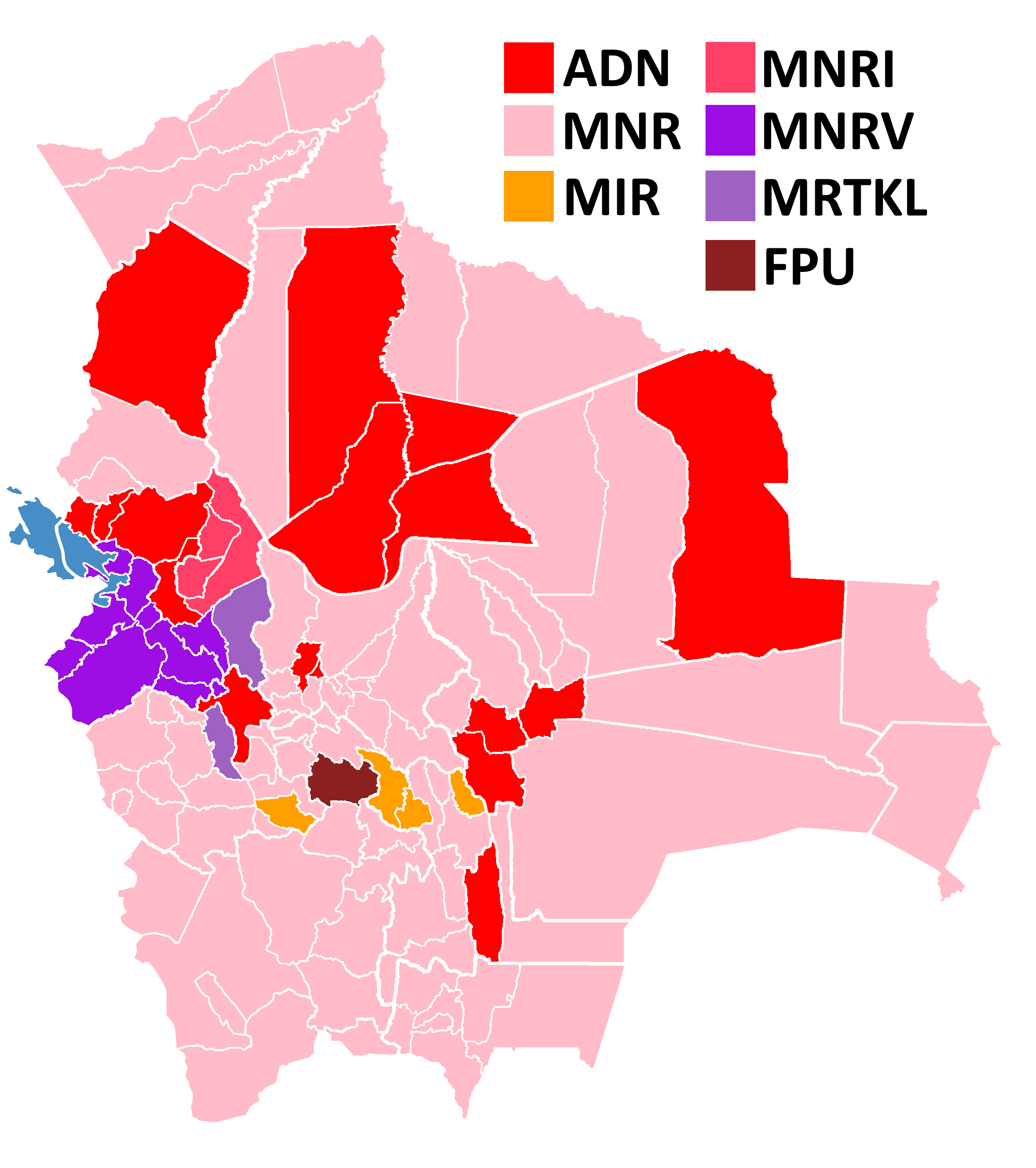
President before election
Hernán Siles Zuazo
MNRI
Elected President
Víctor Paz Estenssoro
MNR

General elections were held in Bolivia on 14 July 1985. As no candidate for the presidency received over 50% of the vote, the National Congress was required to elect a President on 4 August. Although Hugo Banzer of Nationalist Democratic Action (ADN) received the most public votes, Congress elected Víctor Paz Estenssoro of the Revolutionary Nationalist Movement (MNR).

== Campaign ==
Since 1982, the country had undergone an economic crisis as Bolivia's hyperinflation reached the fourth highest ever recorded in the world. The incumbent President Hernán Siles Zuazo faced little support from Congress and debilitating strikes led by Juan Lechín. Under pressure from Congress, Siles ultimately allowed general elections to be moved forward by one year, thus shortening his own constitutional mandate.

The new elections, set for 14 July 1985, were the first to be held since the country's transition back to democracy in October 1982. The previous elections had been held in 1980 but were annulled by a military coup led by General Luis García Meza. As a result, a total of 18 political parties were on the ballot, the largest number out of any election in Bolivian history. Former presidents Víctor Paz Estenssoro and Hugo Banzer presented themselves as candidates for the ADN and MNR. For Paz Estenssoro, this was his eighth presidential bid and the fourth since he was last elected in 1964 while this was Banzer's third campaign in a row since 1979.

On 14 December 1984, given the dire situation of the current government, Jaime Paz Zamora resigned his position as Siles' vice president to run for president. As such, the Revolutionary Left Movement (MIR) left its governing alliance with Siles' Left-wing Revolutionary Nationalist Movement (MNRI) and joined the opposition. Further splintering in the MNRI also saw members of the peasant sector split from the MNR and form the Left-wing Revolutionary Nationalist Movement – 1 (MNRI-1). Nevertheless, the MNRI still opted to present Roberto Jordán Pando as their presidential candidate.

== Results ==
The result saw Hugo Banzer of the ADN win the popular vote by 32.83%, 2.8 points ahead of Víctor Paz Estenssoro. The popular vote victory of Hugo Banzer was a testament to the gradual erosion of popularity of the opposition as well as to Paz Estenssoro's continued inability to win a majority of voters (since 1978 he had consistently reached either second or third place). Discontent with the economic management of the left-wing and constant strikes from trade unions (traditionally affiliated with the left) produced a rightward shift in the electorate.

Paz Zamora's position in third place at 10.18% was notable as it established his party as one of the three top political forces in the country and validated the MIR's decision to split with the MNRI. For the MNRI, the result was catastrophic. At just 5.48%, the incumbent was relegated to a minor political party. For the remaining 14 minor parties, the results demonstrated that regardless of the number of candidates, the population would mostly vote on only three to four viable parties leaving the rest with little political power.

Party	Presidential candidate	Votes	%	Seats			
Party	Presidential candidate	Votes	%	Chamber	+/–	Senate	+/–
Nationalist Democratic Action	Hugo Banzer	493,735	32.83	41	+17	10	+4
Revolutionary Nationalist Movement	Víctor Paz Estenssoro	456,704	30.36	43	–	16	–
Revolutionary Left Movement	Jaime Paz Zamora	153,143	10.18	15	–	1	–
Left-wing Revolutionary Nationalist Movement	Roberto Jordán Pando	82,418	5.48	8	–	0	–
Revolutionary Nationalist Movement–Vanguard	Carlos Serrate	72,197	4.80	6	New	0	New
Socialist Party – 1	Ramiro Velasco Romero	38,786	2.58	5	–5	0	–1
United People's Front	Antonio Araníbar Quiroga	38,124	2.53	4	–	0	–
Túpac Katari Revolutionary Liberation Movement	Jenaro Flores Santos	31,678	2.11	2	New	0	New
Christian Democratic Party	Luis Ossio	24,079	1.60	3	–	0	–
Bolivian Socialist Falange	David Añez Pedraza	19,985	1.33	3	0	0	0
Tupac Katari Revolutionary Movement	Macabeo Chila Prieto	16,269	1.08	0	New	0	New
Revolutionary Workers' Party	Guillermo Lora	13,712	0.91	0	New	0	New
Popular Civic Action	Raúl Catacora Cordova	12,918	0.86	0	New	0	New
Left-wing Revolutionary Nationalist Movement – 1	Francisco Figueroa	11,696	0.78	0	–	0	–
United Left	Isaac Sandoval Rodríguez	10,892	0.72	0	New	0	New
Progressive National Force	Luis Fernando Mostajo	9,635	0.64	0	New	0	New
Revolutionary Humanist Action	Juan Santa Cruz	9,420	0.63	0	New	0	New
National Renewal Alliance	Humberto Cayoja Riart	8,665	0.58	0	New	0	New
Total		1,504,056	100.00	130	0	27	0
Valid votes		1,504,056	87.02				
Invalid/blank votes		224,309	12.98				
Total votes		1,728,365	100.00				
Registered voters/turnout		2,108,458	81.97				
Source: Nohlen

=== By department ===
Department	ADN	MNR	MIR	Others
Beni	37.44%	38.71%	6.34%	17.51%
Chuquisaca	21.37%	25.39%	21.90%	31.34%
Cochabamba	34.26%	31.00%	11.51%	23.22%
La Paz	36.39%	19.57%	9.12%	34.92%
Oruro	28.33%	28.86%	12.05%	30.76%
Pando	33.30%	45.96%	4.43%	16.31%
Potosi	20.88%	33.06%	15.19%	30.87%
Santa Cruz	38.60%	42.77%	5.57%	13.06%
Tarija	24.13%	52.81%	6.65%	16.41%
Source: Constituency-Level Election Archive

=== Congressional ballot ===
Only Hugo Banzer of the ADN and Víctor Paz Estenssoro of the MNR contested the 4 August Congressional ballot. Whilst Banzer was only supported by his own party, Paz also received the votes of the Revolutionary Left Movement (MIR), the Left-wing Revolutionary Nationalist Movement (MNRI), the Revolutionary Nationalist Movement–Vanguard (MNRV), the Christian Democratic Party (PDC) and the Revolutionary Liberation Movement Tupaq Katari (MRTK). Socialist Party-1 (PS-1), the Bolivian Socialist Falange (FSB) and the United People's Front (FPU) did not support either candidate. Víctor Paz Estenssoro, at age 78, became the oldest president in Bolivian history.

Candidate	Party	Votes	%
Víctor Paz Estenssoro	Revolutionary Nationalist Movement	94	64.83
Hugo Banzer	Nationalist Democratic Action	51	35.17
Total		145	100.00
Total votes		145	–
Registered voters/turnout		157	92.36
Source: Morales

== See also ==
- Bolivian National Congress, 1985–1989

== Bibliography ==
- Gisbert, Carlos D. Mesa (2003). Presidentes de Bolivia: entre urnas y fusiles : el poder ejecutivo, los ministros de estado (in Spanish). Editorial Gisbert.
