= 1985–1989 Bolivian National Congress =

The Bolivian National Congress 1985–1989 was elected on 14 July 1985.

== Chamber of Deputies ==
Deputy	Alliance	Party	Department
Abel López Guzmán	ADN	ADN	Chuquisaca
Adalid Contreras Heredia	MIR	MIR	Potosí
Agustín Ameller Gatica	MNR	PCML	Oruro
Alberto Retamozo	MNR	MNR	Potosí
Alcides Alvarado Daza	MNRI	MNRI	La Paz
Alejo Rojas Vásquez	MNR	MNR	Cochabamba
Alex Arteaga Chávez	ADN	ADN	Beni
Alfonso Ferrufino Valderrama	FPU	MIR-BL	Cochabamba
Alfredo Arce Carpio	ADN	ADN	La Paz
Alvaro Pérez Del Castillo	MNR	MNR	La Paz
Andres Petricevic Raznatovic	MNR	MNR	La Paz
Angel Gutiérrez Alvarado	MNR	MNR	Cochabamba
Angel Ricardo Cardona	MNRI	MNRI	Oruro
Antonio Araníbar Quiroga	FPU	MIR-BL	La Paz
Antonio Ormachea Méndez	ADN	ADN	La Paz
Antonio Romero Baldivieso	ADN	ADN	Chuquisaca
Antonio Sánchez Zapata	MNR	MNR	Cochabamba
Benjamín Miguel Harb	PDC	PDC	La Paz
Carlos Adrian Salinas Aragon	MIR	MIR	Chuquisaca
Carlos Benquique Ojopi	MNR	MNR	Pando
Carlos Farah	ADN	ADN	Beni
Carlos Serrate Reich	MNRV	MNRV	La Paz
Carlos Simón Simón	MNR	MNR	Beni
Carolina Toledo Canedo	ADN	ADN	La Paz
Casiano Amurrio Rocha	MNR	PCML	Cochabamba
Cimar Ruiz Gutiérrez	ADN	ADN	Tarija
Clay Ramírez Fernández	ADN	ADN	Tarija
Dardo Rocha Salamanca	MIR	MIR	Oruro
David Añez Pedraza	FSB	FSB	Beni
David Bautista Sánchez	ADN	ADN	Pando
Donald Baldivieso	MNRV	MNRV	Potosí
Edgar Barrientos Cazazola	ADN	ADN	Potosí
Edgar Ríos Arce	ADN	ADN	La Paz
Eduardo Arce Durán	MNRV	MNRV	Oruro
Edwin Rodriguez Aguirre	MNR	MNR	La Paz
Enrique Soria Suárez	ADN	ADN	Cochabamba
Federico Kaune Arteaga	MNR	MNR	Tarija
Fernando Barthelemy Martínez	MNR	MNR	Pando
Fernando Cajías	MIR	MIR	La Paz
Fernando Kieffer Guzmán	ADN	ADN	La Paz
Fernando Salazar Paredes	MNRI	MNRI	La Paz
Francisco Gonzales Sueldo	MNR	MNR	Santa Cruz
Franklin Anaya Vásquez	MNR	MNRI-Siglo XX	Cochabamba
Franz Barrios Villegas	FPU	MIR-BL	Chuquisaca
Freddy Vargas Méndez	MNR	UDC	Cochabamba
Gastón Encinas Valverde	MIR	MIR	Chuquisaca
Germán Gutiérrez Gantier	PS-1	PS-1	Chuquisaca
Germán Gutiérrez Ortega	MNR	MNR	Chuquisaca
Gonzalo Simbrón García	MNR	MNR	La Paz
Gonzalo Valda Cárdenas	MIR	MIR	Potosí
Gualberto Gareca Cabero	MNR	MNR	Tarija
Guido Camacho Rodríguez	ADN	ADN	Cochabamba
Guido Riveros	MIR	MIR	La Paz
Guillermo Bedregal Gutiérrez	MNR	MNR	La Paz
Guillermo Capobianco	MIR	MIR	Santa Cruz
Guillermo Fortún Suárez	ADN	ADN	La Paz
Guillermo Mariaca	PS-1	PS-1	Potosí
Guillermo Richter Ascimani	MNR	PCML	Beni
Gustavo Villegas Cortez	MNR	MNR	Potosí
Hedim Céspedes Cossío	ADN	ADN	Santa Cruz
Heriberto Araujo Tórrez	ADN	ADN	Pando
Horacio Tórrez Guzmán	MNRI	MNRI	Chuquisaca
Hugo Flores Salvador	MNR	MNR	Santa Cruz
Hugo Oliva	MNRI	MNRI	Tarija
Hugo Velasco Rosales	MNR	MNR	Santa Cruz
Jaime Taborga Torrico	MIR	MIR	Cochabamba
Javier Campero Paz	MNR	MNR	Tarija
Joaquín Argandoña Ortega	MNR	MNR	Chuquisaca
Jonnhy Morató Morales	PS-1	PS-1	Cochabamba
Jorge Arias Saavedra	ADN	ADN	Oruro
Jorge Brun Portugal	MNR	MNR	Santa Cruz
Jorge Kohler Salas	MIR	MIR	Beni
Jorge Ledezma Aguilar	MNR	MNR	Potosí
Jorge Monje Zapata	ADN	ADN	La Paz
Jorge Otasevic Toledo	MNRI	MNRI	Cochabamba
José Albornoz Suárez	ADN	ADN	Cochabamba
José Brechner Zucher	ADN	ADN	Cochabamba
José Luis Gutiérrez Sardán	FSB	FSB	Pando
Juan Carlos Durán	MNR	MNR	Santa Cruz
Juan José Saavedra Serrano	ADN	ADN	Potosí
Julio Quiñones Flores	MNR	MNR	Potosí
Leopoldo Fernández Ferreira	ADN	ADN	Pando
Leopoldo López Cossío	MIR	MIR	Tarija
Lino Pérez Estrada	ADN	ADN	Potosí
Luis Aguilera Rogelio	MNR	MNR	Pando
Luis Gonzales Quintanilla	MIR	MIR	Cochabamba
Luis Morgan López Baspineiro	MIR	MIR	Chuquisaca
Luis Ossio Sanjinés	PDC	PDC	Potosí
Luis Palenque Cordero	MNR	MNR	Oruro
Manuel García Mealla	MNR	MNR	Tarija
Manuel Paz Soruco	MNR	MNR	Tarija
Marcelo Quiroga Obregón	ADN	ADN	La Paz
Marcos Rodríguez Mamani	ADN	ADN	Oruro
Mario Roncal Antezana	MNRI	MNRI	Potosí
Mario Rueda Peña	MNRI	MNRI	Santa Cruz
Mario Velarde Dorado	MNR	MNRI-Siglo XX	Santa Cruz
Mario Zambrana Colombo	ADN	ADN	Santa Cruz
Neysa Roca Hurtado	ADN	ADN	Santa Cruz
Oscar Montano Rodríguez	MNR	MNR	Beni
Panfilo Yapu Condo	MIR	MIR	Potosí
Pedro Gonzales Flores	MNRV	MNRV	Chuquisaca
Pilar Barranis De Castro	ADN	ADN	Santa Cruz
René Cabrera La Fuente	PDC	PDC	Cochabamba
René Estensoro	MNRV	MNRV	La Paz
Reynaldo Venegas Iporre	MNR	MNR	Oruro
Roberto Lemaitre Mendoza	ADN	ADN	Cochabamba
Roberto Peredo Salvatierra	MNR	MNR	Beni
Roger Cortés Hurtado	PS-1	PS-1	La Paz
Rommel Pantoja Pantoja	FSB	FSB	Santa Cruz
Rubén Darío Castedo Roca	ADN	ADN	Santa Cruz
Samuel Gallardo Lozada	MNR	MNRI-Siglo XX	Chuquisaca
Severino Singuiri Huaquipa	ADN	ADN	Potosí
Simón Reyes Rivera	FPU	PCB	Potosí
Sixto Nelson Fleia Saucedo	ADN	ADN	Santa Cruz
Tiburcio Mamani Clade	MNRV	MNRV	La Paz
Ulises Hurtado Cuéllar	MNR	MNR	Santa Cruz
Valdemar Becerra Becerra	ADN	ADN	Beni
Víctor Hugo Cárdenas	MRTKL	MRTKL	La Paz
Víctor López Alcala	MNR	MNR	Potosí
Vitaliano Tancara Castillo	ADN	ADN	La Paz
Waldo Cerruto Calderón	ADN	ADN	La Paz
Walter Alarcón Rojas	ADN	ADN	Oruro
Walter Alvarez	MIR	MIR	La Paz
Walter Mur Gutiérrez	MNR	MNR	La Paz
Walter Reinaga Vásquez	MRTKL	MRTKL	Potosí
Walter Soriano Lea Plaza	ADN	ADN	Cochabamba
Walter Vásquez Michel	PS-1	PS-1	Oruro
Walter Zuleta Roncal	MNR	MNR	Potosí
Willy Vargas Vacaflor	ADN	ADN	Chuquisaca
Yolanda Landívar Vda De Landívar	ADN	ADN	Santa Cruz

== Chamber of Senators ==
Senator	Alliance	Party	Department
Abel Ayoroa Argandoña	MNR	MNRI-Siglo XX	La Paz
Adalberto Violand Alcázar	ADN	ADN	La Paz
Carlos Azad Arce	ADN	ADN	Pando
Carmelo Caballero Contreras	MNR	MNR	Santa Cruz
Ciro Humboldt Barrero	MNR	MNR	Chuquisaca
Ciro Villavicencio Ruiz	MNR	MNR	Pando
Daniel Cabezas Gómez	MIR	MIR	Chuquisaca
Edil Sandóval Morón	MNR	MNRI-Siglo XX	Santa Cruz
Enrique Prada Abasto	ADN	ADN	Cochabamba
Ernesto Molina Panduro	MNR	MNR	Beni
Gonzalo Sánchez de Lozada	MNR	MNR	Cochabamba
Guillermo Tineo Leigue	ADN	ADN	Beni
Heberto Castedo Liado	ADN	ADN	Santa Cruz
Héctor Ormachea Peñaranda	ADN	ADN	La Paz
Hugo Campero Vacaflor	MNR	MNR	Oruro
Jaime Villegas Duran	MNR	MNR	Potosí
Juan Luzio Grandchant	ADN	ADN	Oruro
Luis Áñez Álvarez	MNR	MNR	Beni
Luis Peláez Rioja	MNR	MNRI-Siglo XX	Oruro
Mario Mercado Vaca Guzmán	ADN	ADN	Potosí
Mario Rolón Anaya	ADN	ADN	Cochabamba
Miguel Ramírez Navarro	MNR	MNR	Chuquisaca
Nuflo Chávez Ortiz	MNR	MNR	Pando
Óscar Lazcano Henry	ADN	ADN	Tarija
Óscar Zamora Medinaceli	MNR	PCML	Tarija
Raúl Lema Patino	MNR	MNR	Tarija
Raúl Pérez Alcalá	MNR	MNR	Potosí

AND – Nationalist Democratic Action

FPU – United People's Front

FSB – Bolivian Socialist Falange

MIR – Revolutionary Left Movement

MIR-BL – Movement of the Revolutionary Left-Free Bolivia

MNR – Revolutionary Nationalist Movement

MNRI – Nationalist Revolutionary Movement of the Left

MNRI-Siglo XX – Leftwing Revolutionary Nationalist Movement - 20th Century

MNRV – Revolutionary Nationalist Movement-Vanguard

MRTKL – Revolutionary Liberation Movement Tupaq Katari

PCB – Communist Party of Bolivia

PCML – Communist Party of Bolivia (Marxist–Leninist)

PDC – Christian Democratic Party

PS-1 – Socialist Party-One

UDC – Christian Democratic Union

== Presidents of the National Congress ==
President	Party		
Julio Garrett Ayllón	MNR	6 August 1985	6 August 1989

== Presidents of the Chamber of Senators ==
President	Party		
Óscar Zamora Medinaceli	PCML	August 1985	August 1986
Ciro Humboldt Barrero	MNR	August 1986	August 1987
Ciro Humboldt Barrero	MNR	August 1987	August 1988
Ciro Humboldt Barrero	MNR	August 1988	August 1989

== Presidents of the Chamber of Deputies ==
President	Alliance	Party	
Gastón Encinas Valverde	MIR	August 1985	August 1986
Willy Vargas Vacaflor	ADN	August 1986	August 1987
Willy Vargas Vacaflor	ADN	August 1987	August 1988
Walter Soriano Lea Plaza	ADN	August 1988	August 1989
