= 1993 Bolivian general election =

- Registered: 2,399,197
- Turnout: 72.16% (▼1.48pp)
- Presidential election
- 6 June 1993 (popular vote) 6 August 1993 (Congress vote)
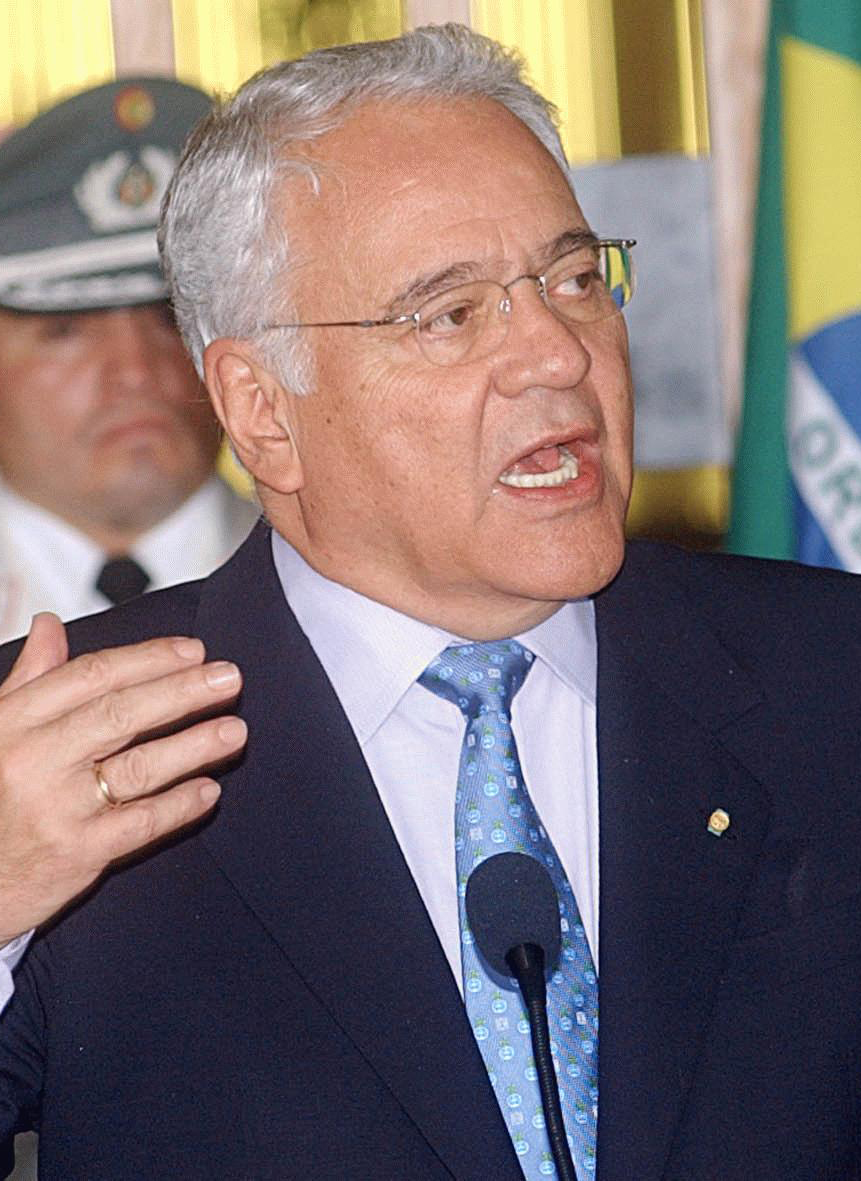

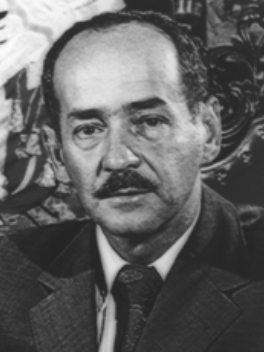

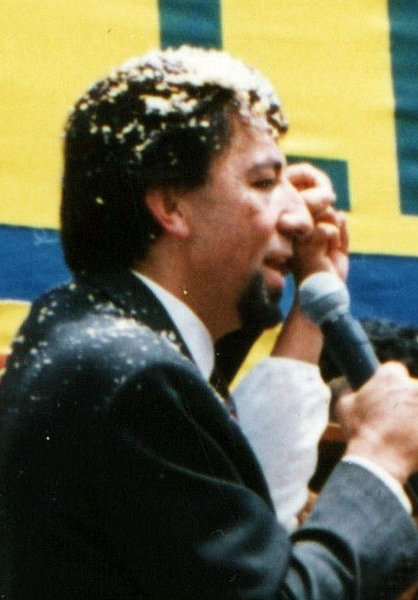
Nominee	Gonzalo Sánchez de Lozada	Hugo Banzer	Carlos Palenque
Party	MNR	ADN	CONDEPA
Alliance	MNR-MRTKL	Patriotic Accord (Note: Coalition consisting of ADN, MIR, PDC, and PCB (ML))
Running mate	Víctor Hugo Cárdenas	Óscar Zamora Medinaceli	Ivo Kuljis
Electoral vote	97
Popular vote	585,837	346,865	235,427
Percentage	35.55%	21.05%	14.29%
Nominee	Max Fernández	Antonio Araníbar Quiroga
Party	UCS	MBL
Running mate	Edgar Talavera Soliza	Miguel Urioste Fernández
Popular vote	226,816	88,260
Percentage	13.77%	5.36%
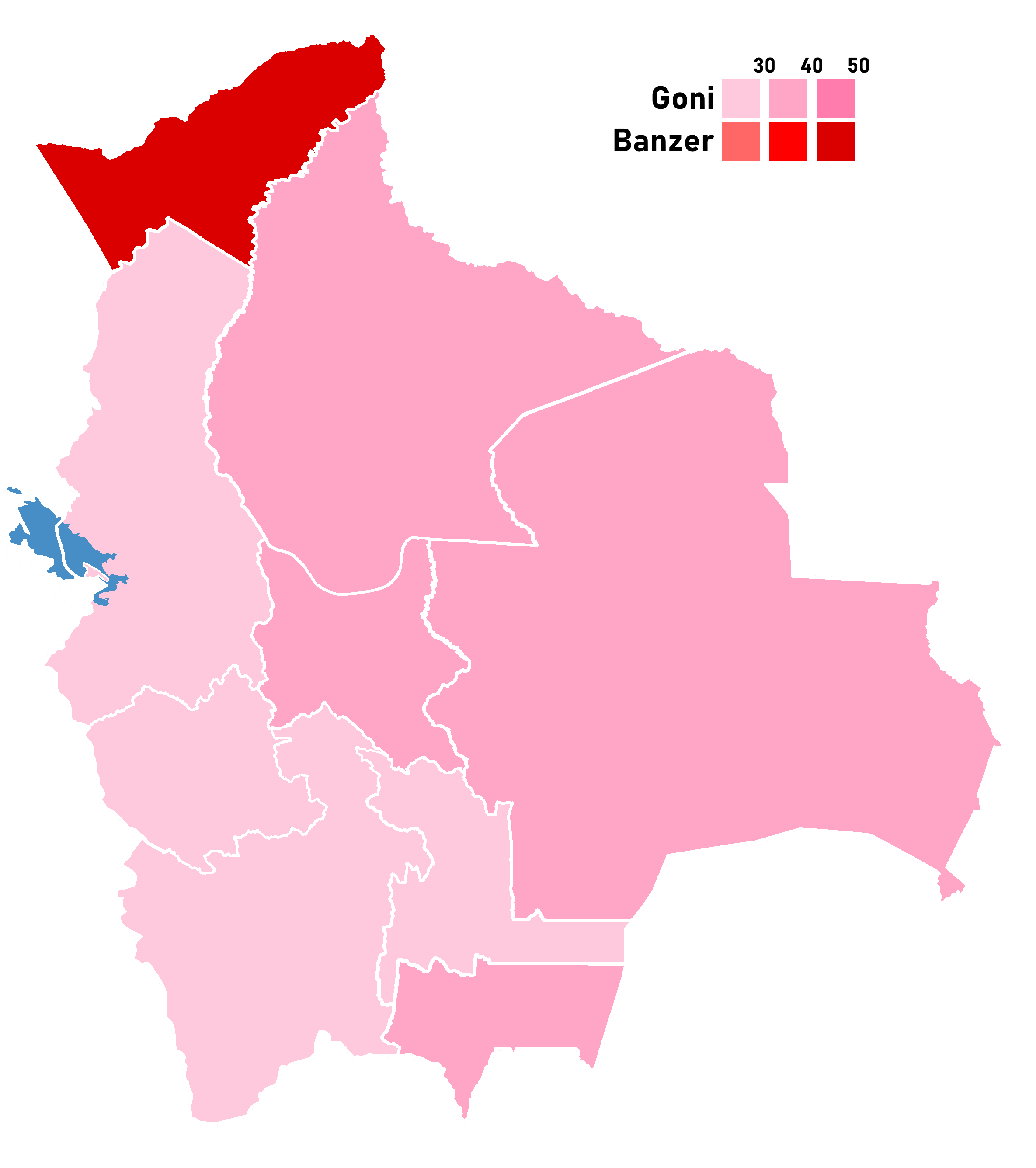
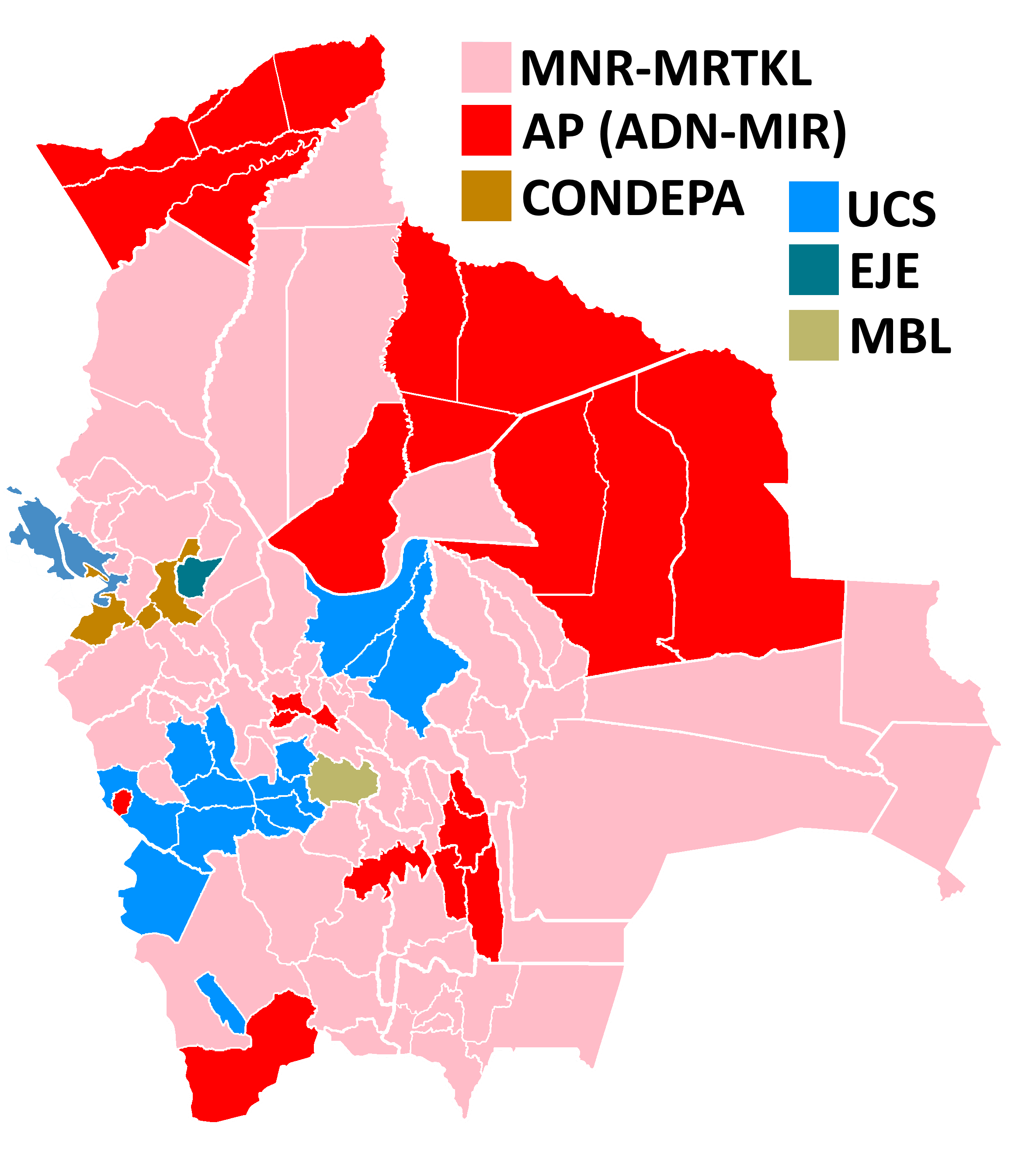
President before election
Jaime Paz Zamora
MIR
Elected President
Gonzalo Sanchez de Lozada
MNR

General elections were held in Bolivia on 6 June 1993. As no candidate for the presidency received over 50% of the vote, the National Congress was required to elect a president on 4 August. Gonzalo Sánchez de Lozada of the MNR-MRTKL alliance was subsequently elected unopposed.

== Campaign ==
Prior to the elections, the Revolutionary Left Movement (MIR) of incumbent Jaime Paz Zamora and the Nationalist Democratic Action (ADN) of ex-president Hugo Banzer formed the Patriotic Accord (AP) alliance. Hugo Banzer, in his fifth bid for the presidency, was presented as the Patriotic Accord's candidate in the election.

Banzer's primary opponent was the returning Revolutionary Nationalist Movement (MNR) candidate Gonzalo Sánchez de Lozada. The MNR's alliance with the Revolutionary Liberation Movement Tupaq Katari (MRTKL) saw Víctor Hugo Cárdenas, an indigenous Aymara, chosen as Sánchez de Lozada's running mate in an attempt to appeal to Bolivia's indigenous population.

The AP was faced with the negative image of corruption faced by Paz Zamora's government and the defensive campaign of Hugo Banzer. Two factors which made the MNR the clear front runner to win the election.

The campaign also saw the emergence of the "neo-populist" Max Fernández and Carlos Palenque candidates who drew the support of sector of the population discontented with the mainstream political parties. Palenque of Conscience of Fatherland (CONDEPA), in his second run, campaigned on a platform of returning to the ideals of the 1952 National Revolution. Solidarity Civic Unity (UCS), in the party's first presidential run, presented Max Fernández.

Prior to the elections the Nationalist Democratic Action and Revolutionary Left Movement parties formed the Patriotic Accord alliance, whilst eight left-wing parties continued the United Left coalition.

A total of 14 candidates were presented for the presidential election.

== Results ==
Gonzalo Sánchez de Lozada won the popular vote by 35.56% to Hugo Banzer's 21.05%. The CONDEPA and UCS candidates won a similar number of votes with a 0.52% difference between Max Fernández and Carlos Palenque. The remaining 10 candidates won 15.34% of the vote between them.

Party	Presidential candidate	Votes	%	Seats			
Party	Presidential candidate	Votes	%	Chamber	+/–	Senate	+/–
MNR–MRTKL	Gonzalo Sánchez de Lozada	585,837	35.55	52	+12	17	+8
Patriotic Accord	Hugo Banzer	346,865	21.05	35	–36	8	–8
Conscience of Fatherland	Carlos Palenque	235,427	14.29	13	+4	1	–1
Solidarity Civic Unity	Max Fernández	226,816	13.77	20	New	1	New
Free Bolivia Movement	Antonio Araníbar Quiroga	88,260	5.36	7	New	0	New
Bolivian Renewal Alliance	Casiano Ancalle Choque	30,867	1.87	1	New	0	New
Alternative to Democratic Socialism	Jerjes Justiniano Talavera	30,286	1.84	1	New	0	New
Revolutionary Vanguard of 9 April	Carlos Serrate	21,100	1.28	0	New	0	New
Bolivian Socialist Falange	José Mario Serrate Paz	20,947	1.27	0	0	0	0
Pachakuti Axis	Félix Cárdenas Aguilar	18,176	1.10	1	New	0	New
United Left	Ramiro Velasco Romero	16,137	0.98	0	–10	0	0
National Katarista Movement	Fernando Untoja Choque	12,627	0.77	0	New	0	New
National Organisation of Independents	Oscar Bonifáz	8,096	0.49	0	New	0	New
Democratic Federalist Movement	Carlos Valverde	6,269	0.38	0	New	0	New
Total		1,647,710	100.00	130	0	27	0
Valid votes		1,647,710	95.17				
Invalid/blank votes		83,599	4.83				
Total votes		1,731,309	100.00				
Registered voters/turnout		2,399,197	72.16				

=== By department ===
Department	PA	MNR-MRTKL	UCS	CONDEPA	Others
Beni	36.93%	41.40%	11.52%	1.25%	8.89%
Chuquisaca	26.23%	31.95%	12.67%	2.52%	26.62%
Cochabamba	21.05%	40.45%	18.75%	3.73%	16.02%
La Paz	13.85%	31.33%	10.52%	30.58%	13.72%
Oruro	18.24%	33.27%	20.31%	11.71%	16.47%
Pando	50.72%	33.09%	6.96%	0.43%	8.80%
Potosi	22.58%	30.65%	19.48%	6.29%	21.00%
Santa Cruz	26.98%	40.52%	13.01%	4.35%	15.15%
Tarija	30.29%	42.34%	13.79%	1.76%	11.82%
Source: Constituency-Level Election Archive

=== Congressional ballot ===
On 6 August 1993, the National Congress convened to elect the president. Gonzalo Sánchez de Lozada was the only candidate voted on, and was supported by his MNR-MRTKL alliance as well as the UCS and MBL. All others parties abstained from voting. Gonzalo Sánchez de Lozada was elected president while Víctor Hugo Cárdenas became Bolivia's first indigenous vice president.

Candidate	Party	Votes	%
Gonzalo Sánchez de Lozada	Revolutionary Nationalist Movement	97	100.00
Total		97	100.00
Total votes		97	–
Registered voters/turnout		157	61.78
Source: Morales

== See also ==
- Bolivian National Congress, 1993–1997

== Bibliography ==
- Gisbert, Carlos D. Mesa (2003). Presidentes de Bolivia: entre urnas y fusiles : el poder ejecutivo, los ministros de estado (in Spanish). Editorial Gisbert.
