= 1964 Bolivian general election =

General elections were held in Bolivia on 31 May 1964. Víctor Paz Estenssoro of the Revolutionary Nationalist Movement (MNR) was the only candidate for president, and was re-elected with 98% of the vote. The MNR retained its large majority in Congress.

== Results ==
Party	Presidential candidate	Votes	%	Seats					
Party	Presidential candidate	Votes	%	Chamber			Senate		
Party	Presidential candidate	Votes	%	Elected	Total	+/–	Elected	Total	+/–
Revolutionary Nationalist Movement	Víctor Paz Estenssoro	1,114,717	97.85	36	57	–7	9	22	–7
Anti-Communist Bolivian Front	No candidate	12,245	1.07	0	0	New	0	0	New
National Civic Union	No candidate	11,142	0.98	1	1	New	0	0	New
Bolivian Socialist Falange	No candidate	613	0.05	0	3	–1	0	0	0
Social Christian Party	No candidate	228	0.02	0	1	0	0	0	0
Authentic Revolutionary Party	No candidate	92	0.01	0	2	–1	0	0	0
Communist Party	No candidate	74	0.01	0	0	0	0	0	0
Revolutionary Party of the Nationalist Left	No candidate	23	0.00	0	9	New	0	5	New
Revolutionary Workers' Party	No candidate	16	0.00	0	0	0	0	0	0
Bolivian Civic Action	No candidate	7	0.00	0	0	0	0	0	0
Total		1,139,157	100	37	73	+1	9	27	0
Valid votes		1,139,157	87.81						
Invalid/blank votes		158,162	12.19						
Total		1,297,319	100						
Registered voters/turnout		1,411,560	91.91						
Source: Nohlen, Political Handbook of the World 1965

== Aftermath ==
Following the elections, General René Barrientos led a military coup in November 1964, removing Paz from office. The coup led to a series of authoritarian and military regimes that remained in power until 1982.
