= Christian Democratic Party (Bolivia) =

Christian Democratic Party Partido Demócrata Cristiano
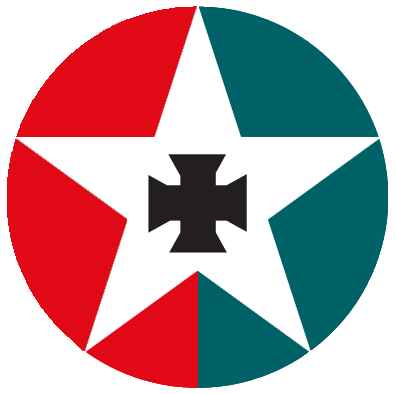
- Abbreviation: PDC
- Leader: Rodrigo Paz
- President: Jose Roberto Castro Peñaranda
- Founders: Remo Di Natale; Benjamín Miguel Harb; Javier Caballero; Emanuel Andrade
- Founded: February 6, 1954; 72 years ago
- Headquarters: La Paz
- Membership (2025): 42,603
- Ideology: Conservatism; Decentralisation; Historical: Third Way
- Political position: Centre-right
- National affiliation: None (since 2025) (Note: The party was formerly part of Creemos (2020–2025), Social Democratic Power (2005–2008), Democratic Revolutionary Front – New Alternative (1980) and Revolutionary Nationalist Movement – Alliance (1979).)
- Regional affiliation: Christian Democrat Organization of America
- Colours: Teal; Red
- Senate: 16 / 36
- Deputies: 49 / 130

Party flag

Website
- Official website

The Christian Democratic Party (Spanish: Partido Demócrata Cristiano, PDC) is a political party in Bolivia. Historically a Third Way party, it has now been described as a centre-right conservative party that is supportive of capitalism and decentralisation.

== History ==
Founded on 6 February 1954 as the Social Christian Party (Spanish: Partido Social Cristiano, PSC), it assumed its present name at a party congress in November 1964. Its intellectual foundations were study centres of the Church's social doctrine, the Bolivian Catholic Action and "Integral Humanism" (a centre for the study of the philosophy of Jacques Maritain). It remains a conventionally "tercerista" party, calling for a third way between capitalism and socialism – a way that would be more humane and truly democratic than either competing sociopolitical system. It was founded by Remo Di Natale, Benjamín Miguel Harb, Javier Caballero, and Emanuel Andrade.

The Christian Democratic Party took part in the 1958 and 1962 congressional elections, and in 1962 Benjamín Miguel Harb became its first deputy. It boycotted the 1964 and 1966 presidential votes.

In 1967, the party took part in the Government of the president of René Barrientos Ortuño, being given responsibility for the Ministry of Labour and Social Security. This was a major misjudgment by the PDC leadership. When military forces carried out bloody raids against mining camps, the Christian Democratic Party was forced to withdraw in anger and embarrassment, with severe internal divisions resulting. The party's youth organization had been discontented with the third-road philosophy for some time, and the mine camp invasions helped to crystallize their rebellion; they favored revolutionary socialism as a solution to Bolivia's dilemmas. In the late 1960s, the youth wing seceded to form the Revolutionary PDC which later became the Revolutionary Left Movement (MIR). Several discontented members of the party, including Jose Luis Roca Garcia, also left to join General Alfredo Ovando Candía's short-lived nationalist revolutionary government in 1969–1970.

Under the dictatorship of President Hugo Banzer Suárez the Christian Democrats fought for human rights, fundamental freedoms and the holding of elections, but its president Benjamín Miguel Harb was exiled in 1974 and its organizing secretary Felix Vargas forced to leave the country shortly afterwards.

The PDC took part in 1978 general elections, running former Defense Minister General René Bernal Escalante, a leader of the right-wing faction which supported the Hugo Banzer Suárez regime. After the 1978 election, René Bernal Escalante split from the PDC and founded the Christian Democratic Union.

For the elections held on 1 July 1979, the party joined the Revolutionary Nationalist Movement-Alliance with four other parties — the Revolutionary Nationalist Movement (MNR), the Authentic Revolutionary Party (PRA), the Marxist Leninist Communist Party (PCML) and the Tupaj Katari Revolutionary Movement (MRTK). The Alliance ran a MNR's leader Víctor Paz Estenssoro as its presidential candidate and a PDC's leader Luis Ossio Sanjines as its vice-presidential candidate. In 1979 the Christian Democratic Party won nine seats in the Chamber of Deputies and three in the Senate.

In 1980 the PDC took part in an electoral coalition Democratic Revolutionary Front-New Alternative backing ex-President Luis Adolfo Siles Salinas, which polled few votes; the leader of the PDC Benjamín Miguel Harb ran as vice-presidential candidate.

Soon after the restoration of democratic government, in November 1982, Christian Democrats took a seat in the Hernán Siles Zuazo Government, but withdrew from the coalition in October 1984.

The PDC took part in 1985 general elections, running Luis Ossio Sanjines as its presidential candidate and Jaime Ponce García as vice-presidential candidate, and won three seats in the Chamber of Deputies. Although winning no legislative seats as an ally of the Nationalist Democratic Action in May 1989, Luis Ossio Sanjines, was elected vice-president of the Republic as a result of its adherence to the Nationalist Democratic Action – Revolutionary Left Movement pact (Patriotic Agreement) in August. The PDC campaigned as a member of the Patriotic Agreement in 1993 elections. The Christian Democratic Party was one of the founding components of Social and Democratic Power (PODEMOS), for which it provided its electoral registration. Following the 2005 election, this alliance led the parliamentary opposition to President Evo Morales.

The party joined Creemos for the 2020 Bolivian general election.

For the 2025 Bolivian general election, the PDC nominated senator from Tarija Rodrigo Paz as its presidential candidate. In a major upset, Paz advanced to the second round of voting, where he defeated former President Jorge Quiroga, becoming Bolivia's first President to belong to the PDC. The party also won 16 seats in the Senate and 49 seats in the Chamber of Deputies. The electoral results gave the PDC the largest parliamentary bloc, allowing it to form a government.

== Election results ==
=== Presidential elections ===
Election	Presidential nominee	Votes	%	Votes	%	Result
Election	Presidential nominee	First round		Second round		Result
1978	René Bernal Escalante	167,131	8.63%			Lost ✗
1979	Víctor Paz Estenssoro (MNR)	527,184	35.87%	64 (Note: After no candidate won more than 50% of the vote in the general election, the National Congress was required to elect the president in an indirect second round.)	44.44%	Lost ✗
1980	Luis Adolfo Siles Salinas (OID)	39,401	3.01%			Lost ✗
1985	Luis Ossio	24,079	1.60%			Lost ✗
1989	Hugo Banzer (ADN)	357,298	25.24%			Lost ✗
1993	Hugo Banzer (ADN)	346,865	21.05%			Lost ✗
1997	Hugo Banzer (ADN)	484,705	22.26%	118	79.73%	Elected ✓
2002	Did not contest					
2005	Jorge Quiroga (PODEMOS)	821,745	28.59%			Lost ✗
2009	Did not contest					
2014	Jorge Quiroga	467,311	9.04%			Lost ✗
2019	Chi Hyun Chung	539,081	8.78%			Annulled ✗
2020	Luis Fernando Camacho (Creemos)	862,186	14.00%			Lost ✗
2025	Rodrigo Paz	1,717,532	32.06%	3,506,458	54.89%	Elected ✓

=== Chamber of Deputies and Senate elections ===
Election	Party leader	Votes	%	Chamber seats	+/-	Position	Senate seats	+/-	Position	Status
1958	Benjamín Miguel Harb	2,888	0.66%	0 / 68	New	▲4th	0 / 18	New	▲4th	Extra-parliamentary
1960	Did not contest			0 / 68	0	—N/a	0 / 18	0	—N/a	Extra-parliamentary
1962	Benjamín Miguel Harb	19,825	1.90%	1 / 72	▲1	▲4th	0 / 27	0	▲2nd	Opposition
1964	Benjamín Miguel Harb	228	0.02%	1 / 73	0	4th	0 / 27	0	2nd	Opposition
1966	Boycotted			0 / 102	▼1	—N/a	0 / 27	0	—N/a	Extra-parliamentary
1979	Luis Ossio	As part of MNRA		9 / 117	▲9	▲4th	3 / 27	▲3	▲3rd	Snap election
1980	Luis Ossio	As part of FDR–NA		5 / 130	▼4	▼5th	0 / 27	▼3	▼5th	Military junta (1980-1982)
1980	Luis Ossio	As part of FDR–NA		5 / 130	▼4	▼5th	0 / 27	▼3	▼5th	Coalition (1982-1984)
1980	Luis Ossio	As part of FDR–NA		5 / 130	▼4	▼5th	0 / 27	▼3	▼5th	Opposition (1984-1985)
1985	Luis Ossio	24,079	1.60%	3 / 130	▼2	▼8th	0 / 27	0	▼4th	Support
1989	Luis Ossio	In coalition with ADN		0 / 130	▼3	▲6th	0 / 27	0	▼5th	Extra-parliamentary
1993 (Note: The amount of seats won by PDC among those won by the coalition is uncertain.)		As part of AP		0 / 130	0	▼9th	0 / 27	0	5th	Extra-parliamentary
1997		In coalition with ADN and NFR		0 / 130	0	▲8th	0 / 27	0	▼6th	Extra-parliamentary
2002	Did not contest			0 / 130	0	—N/a	0 / 27	0	—N/a	Extra-parliamentary
2005		As part of PODEMOS		43 / 130	▲43	▲2nd	13 / 27	▲13	▲2nd	Opposition
2009	Did not contest			0 / 130	▼43	—N/a	0 / 27	▼13	—N/a	Extra-parliamentary
2014	Jorge Quiroga	454,233	9.06%	10 / 130	▲10	▲3rd	2 / 36	▲2	▲3rd	Opposition
2019		522,582	8.80%	9 / 130	▼1	3rd	0 / 36	▼2	▼4th	Annulled
2020		As part of Creemos		16 / 130	▲7	3rd	4 / 36	▲4	▲4th	Opposition
2025	Roberto Castro Peñaranda	1,683,891	32.15%	47 / 130	▲29	▲1st	16 / 36	▲12	▲1st	Government
