= 1951 Bolivian general election =

- 6 May 1951
- Registered: 204,649
- Presidential election
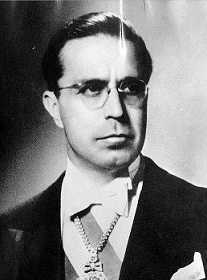

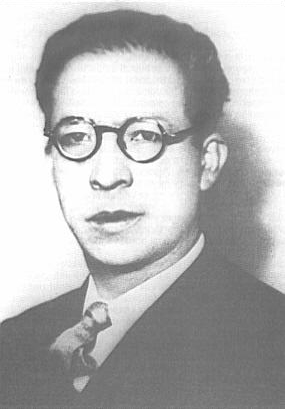

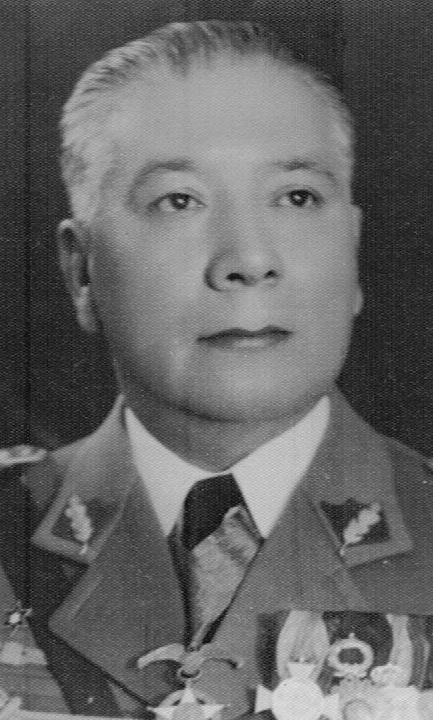

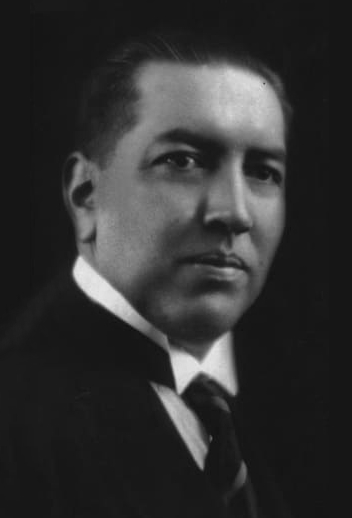
Nominee	Víctor Paz Estenssoro	Gabriel Gosálvez	Bernardino Bilbao Rioja
Party	MNR	PURS	FSB
Popular vote	54,129	40,381	13,259
Percentage	42.91%	32.01%	10.51%
Nominee	Guillermo Gutiérrez Vea Murguía	Tomás Manuel Elío
Party	ACB	Liberal
Popular vote	6,654	6,530
Percentage	5.27%	5.17%
President before election
Mamerto Urriolagoitía
PURS
Elected President
Election results annulled
President Urriolagoitía enacts a self-coup.
Brigadier General Hugo Ballivián becomes de facto president

General elections were held in Bolivia on 6 May 1951. Víctor Paz Estenssoro of the opposition Revolutionary Nationalist Movement (MNR) received the most votes in the presidential election, but as he did not obtain an absolute majority, the National Congress was constitutionally obliged to elect a President on 6 August from the three candidates who received the most public votes. However, on 16 May a military junta assumed responsibility for the Government with Brigadier General Hugo Ballivián as president.

The National Congress was ultimately dissolved by Supreme Decree of 7 June 1951, which annulled the results of the elections. Paz Estenssoro went into exile until 1952 when the Bolivian National Revolution enabled him to take office as president.

== Electoral system ==
Until 1956, Bolivia did not have universal suffrage. Rather, the country operated under the "qualified vote" system in which deputies elected in parish and provincial boards then voted in general elections. Under this system, ballots for president and vice president were separate resulting in different vote totals for each.

== Campaign ==
The Republican Socialist Unity Party (PURS) and the Social Democratic Party (PSD) formed the Social Democratic Action alliance to contest the election, with Gabriel Gosalvez of PURS running for president and Roberto Arce of the PSD running for vice-president.

== Results ==
=== President ===
Candidate	Party	Votes	%
Víctor Paz Estenssoro	Revolutionary Nationalist Movement	54,129	42.92
Gabriel Gosálvez	Republican Socialist Unity Party	40,381	32.02
Bernardino Bilbao Rioja	Bolivian Socialist Falange	13,259	10.51
Guillermo Gutiérrez Vea Murguía	Bolivian Civic Action	6,654	5.28
Tomás Manuel Elío	Liberal Party	6,530	5.18
José Antonio Arze	Revolutionary Left Party	5,170	4.10
Total		126,123	100.00
Registered voters/turnout		204,649	–
Source: Nohlen

=== Vice-President ===
Candidate	Party	Votes	%
Hernán Siles Zuazo	Revolutionary Nationalist Movement	52,602	43.25
Roberto Arce	Social Democratic Party	38,202	31.41
Alfredo Flores	Bolivian Socialist Falange	12,397	10.19
Julio Salmón	Bolivian Civic Action	6,778	5.57
Bailón Mercado	Liberal Party	6,558	5.39
Abelardo Villalpando Retamozo	Revolutionary Left Party	5,093	4.19
Total		121,630	100.00
Registered voters/turnout		204,649	–
Source: OEP

== Bibliography ==
- Gisbert, Carlos D. Mesa (2003). Presidentes de Bolivia: entre urnas y fusiles : el poder ejecutivo, los ministros de estado (in Spanish). Editorial Gisbert.
