= Revolutionary Nationalist Movement – Alliance =

The Revolutionary Nationalist Movement–Alliance (Spanish: Movimiento Nacionalista Revolucionario-Alianza, MNRA) was a centrist electoral political alliance in Bolivia. The MNRA was formed in 1979 by

- the Revolutionary Nationalist Movement, MNR;
- the Tupaj Katari Revolutionary Movement-Chila, MRTK-Chila (faction led by Macabeo Chila);
- the Communist Party of Bolivia (Marxist–Leninist), PCML;
- the Christian Democratic Party, PDC;
- the Authentic Revolutionary Party, PRA (historical faction led by Walter Guevara Arce).

In 1979 presented as its presidential candidate Víctor Paz Estenssoro (MNR) and Luis Ossio Sanjines (PDC) as vice-presidential candidate and in 1980 presented Víctor Paz Estenssoro (MNR) and Ñuflo Chávez Ortiz (MNR).
