= 1958 Bolivian legislative election =

Parliamentary elections were held in Bolivia on 20 June 1958. The Revolutionary Nationalist Movement (MNR) received 85% of the vote, and retained its large majorities in both houses of Congress.

== Results ==
Party	Votes	%	Seats					
Party	Votes	%	Chamber			Senate		
Party	Votes	%	Elected	Total	+/–	Elected	Total	+/–
Revolutionary Nationalist Movement	371,450	85.40	32	65	+4	6	18	0
Bolivian Socialist Falange	53,264	12.25	2	3	–4	0	0	0
Communist Party	5,343	1.23	0	0	0	0	0	0
Social Christian Party	2,888	0.66	0	0	New	0	0	New
Revolutionary Workers' Party	1,994	0.46	0	0	0	0	0	0
Total	434,939	100	34	68	0	6	18	0
Valid votes	434,939	97.96						
Invalid/blank votes	9,053	2.04						
Total	443,992	100						
Source: Nohlen, Political Handbook of the World
