= Christian Democratic Union (Bolivia) =

Political party in Bolivia

The Christian Democratic Union (Spanish: Unidad Democrática Cristiana, UDC) was a right-wing Christian-democratic political party in Bolivia.

In January 1979 the right-wing faction split from the Christian Democratic Party and founded the Christian Democratic Union. Led by René Bernal Escalante.

In 1979 the Christian Democratic Union took part in an electoral coalition Popular Alliance for National Integration backing René Bernal Escalante.

In 1985 Christian Democratic Union allied with the Revolutionary Nationalist Movement and its candidate Víctor Paz Estenssoro.
