= Julio Garrett =

Bolivian politician and lawyer (1925–2018)

Julio Garrett Ayllón
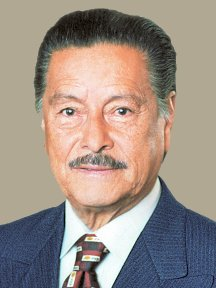

Ambassador to Bolivia to Argentina
- In office 1995–1997

33rd Vice President of Bolivia
- In office August 6, 1985 – August 6, 1989
- President: Víctor Paz Estenssoro
- Preceded by: Jaime Paz Zamora (1984)
- Succeeded by: Luis Ossio

President of the Senate of Bolivia
- In office 1982–1985
- Preceded by: Wálter Guevara
- Succeeded by: Gonzalo Sánchez de Lozada

Foreign Minister of Bolivia
- In office 19 November 1979 – 7 April 1980
- President: Lidia Gueiler Tejada
- Preceded by: Guillermo Bedregal Gutiérrez
- Succeeded by: Gastón Araoz Levy

Ambassador of Bolivia to the Soviet Union
- In office 1969–1973
- Preceded by: Office created
- Succeeded by: ?

Personal details
- Born: May 22, 1925 Sucre, Bolivia
- Died: March 19, 2018 (aged 92) Sucre, Bolivia

Julio Garrett Ayllón (May 22, 1925 – March 19, 2018) was a Bolivian politician and lawyer who served as the 33rd vice president of Bolivia from 1985 to 1989 during the presidency of Víctor Paz Estenssoro.

== Early life and education ==
Garrett was born in Sucre, Bolivia on May 22, 1925. He studied law at the University of Saint Francis Xavier in Sucre and the Rio Branco Institute in Brazil. He then studied international relations in Paris before returning to Bolivia, where he chaired the department of sociology at Oruro Technical University.

== Politics ==
Garrett was first elected to the Senate of Bolivia, representing Oruro, in 1966. A proponent of bilateral relations with socialist and communist nations, Garrett was appointed as Bolivia's first Ambassador to the Soviet Union from 1969 until 1973. In December 1973, Garrett joined the Revolutionary Nationalist Movement (MNR) political party. Just one month later, Garrett, along with former President Víctor Paz Estenssoro, another member of the MNR, were forced into exile in January 1974. Garrett remained in exile in Paraguay and Argentina for five years, until his return to Bolivia in 1979.

Julio Garrett Ayllón was elected to the Senate in 1979 soon after his return from exile. He was soon appointed Foreign Minister of Bolivia, a position he held briefly from 1979 until 1980. He won re-election to the Senate in 1980, but was once again forced into exile from 1980 until 1982 during the dictatorship of President Luis García Meza Tejada.

Garrett returned to Bolivia in 1982 following the end of the García Meza dictatorship and the restoration of democracy. He was elected President of the Senate of Bolivia from 1982 until 1985.

In 1985, Garrett was elected Vice President of Bolivia as the running mate of President Víctor Paz Estenssoro. Garrett, who served as vice president from 1985 to 1989, established the Universidad Andina Simón Bolívar in Sucre during his tenure. Garrett was re-elected to the Senate in 1989, but his election was later invalidated by the Court of Elections. He was appointed to the Andean Parliament, the deliberative body of the Andean Community, in 1992.

Garrett was elected to the national Senate for a fifth term, representing Chuquisaca Department, in 1993. He held the Senate seat from 1993 to 1995. He then served as the ambassador of Bolivia to Argentina from 1995 until 1997.

== Death ==
Julio Garrett Ayllón died in Sucre on March 19, 2018, at the age of 92.

Political offices
Preceded by Guillermo Bedregal Gutiérrez	Foreign Minister of Bolivia; 1979–1980	Succeeded by Gastón Araoz Levy
Preceded by Jaime Paz Zamora	Vice President of Bolivia; 1985–1989	Succeeded by Luis Ossio
