= Ñuflo Chávez Ortiz =

Bolivian lawyer and politician

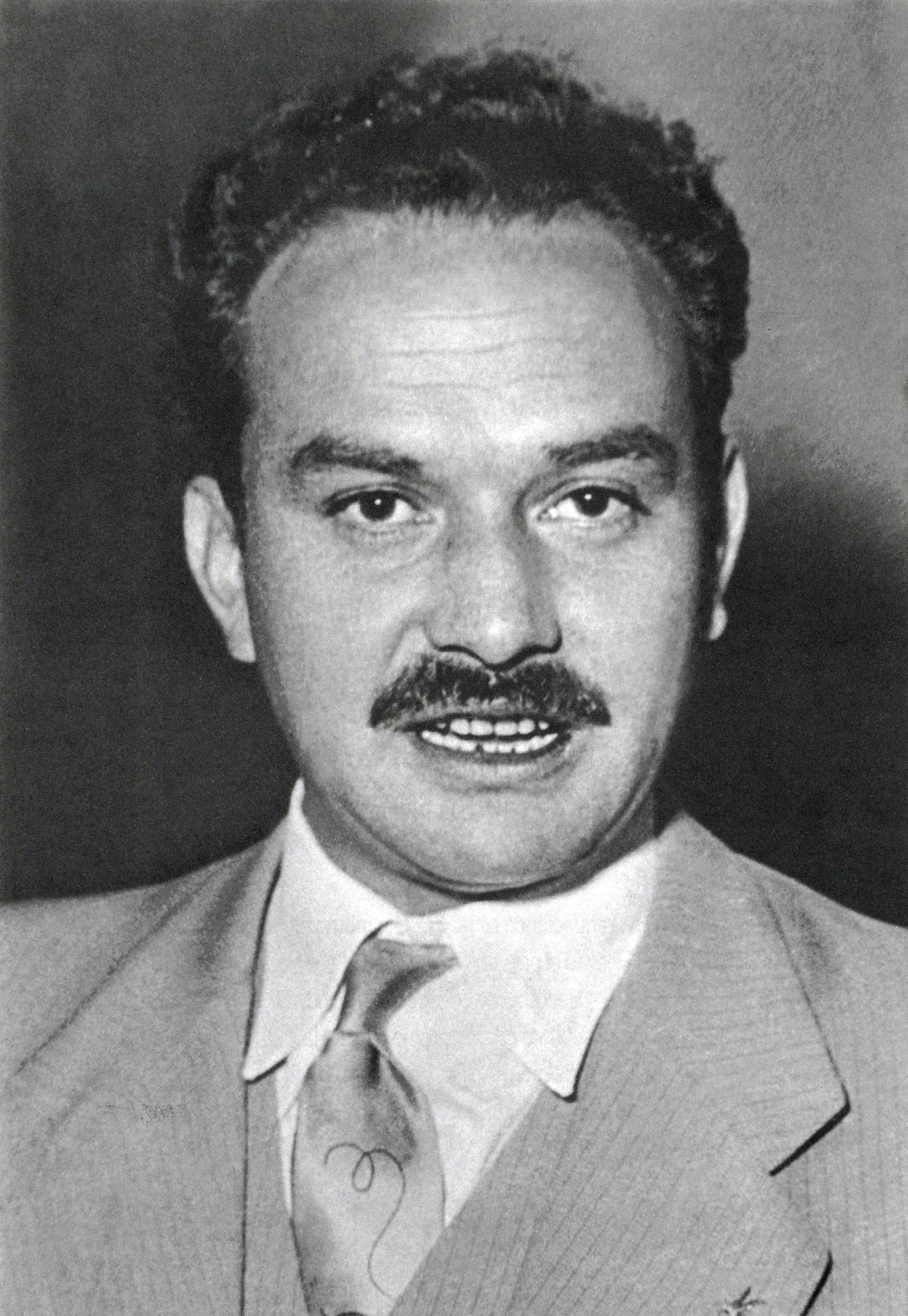

28th Vice President of Bolivia
- In office 6 August 1956 – 24 June 1957
- President: Hernán Siles Zuazo
- Preceded by: Hernán Siles Zuazo
- Succeeded by: Juan Lechín (1960)

Personal details
- Born: 3 October 1923 Santa Cruz, Bolivia
- Died: 2 July 1996 (aged 72) Bolivia

Ñuflo Chávez Ortiz (3 October 1923 – 2 July 1996) was a Bolivian lawyer and politician. He was 28th vice president of Bolivia during the first Government of Hernán Siles Zuazo since August 1956 till he resigned in 1957. He was one of the founders of MNR (National Revolutionary Movement), along with Víctor Paz Estenssoro, Wálter Guevara Arze, Carlos Montenegro, Germán Monroy Block and Lidia Gueiler Tejada, amongst others.

== Early and Academic life ==
Ñuflo Chávez was born in Santa Cruz de la Sierra on 3 October 1923 to Castulo Chávez Eguez, a Supreme Court magistrate and politician. He grew up in Santa Cruz de la Sierra and Sucre, Bolivia's Capital city and location of the Supreme Court of Justice. He attended law school at the Higher University of San Andrés and University of San Francisco Xavier. Later in life, he served as a professor in several Bolivian and Peruvian universities.

== Public life ==
Since a very young age, he participated in the political life of his country, joining the ranks of MNR (Nationalist Revolutionary Movement) in 1945. He stood out for his participation in the 1949 Civil War, becoming the General Secretary of his party in his home-town.

He actively participated in the 1952 Bolivian National Revolution. He was appointed minister of agriculture and peasant affairs in 1952 till 1955. He participated in the creation of the Bolivian Labour league Central Obrera Boliviana and authored the Bolivian Land Reform. He was elected vice-president of the Republic of Bolivia in 1956 but resigned in 1957, due to discrepancies he held with the president, around his monetary stabilization measures. Ñuflo Chávez was the youngest vice-president of the country, taking office at the age of 33 years.

He headed the Mining and Oil Ministry in 1960 during the second MNR (Nationalist Revolutionary Movement) government. He also served as a senator between 1962 and 1964. After the 1964 coup, staged by General René Barrientos Ortuño, Chávez had to leave in exile to Peru. He held residence in this neighbouring country for a number of years, teaching economy in San Marcos University.

He returned to Bolivia in 1978. He ran for Vice-President of Bolivia, once again, as candidate of MNR (Nationalist Revolutionary Movement) in 1980, along with Victor Paz Estenssoro who ran for president, losing those elections. In 1985, he joined once more the Senate and in 1986, he served as Bolivian ambassador to Peru, after what he retired from public life.

He died in poverty on 2 July 1996, being 72 years old.

== Literary work ==
- El Siglo del Estaño (The Century of Tin)
- Fundiciones de Estaño en Bolivia (Bolivian Tin Foundries)
- Cinco Ensayos y un Anhelo (Five Essays and a Yearning)
- Carta a los Trabajadores de mi Patria (Open Letter to the Workers of my Homeland)
- Sistema Económico Capitalista (Capitalist-Economic System)
- Pensamiento Económico: Introducción a la Ciencia Política (Economic thought process: An introduction to Political Science)
- Introducción a la Economía Política (Introduction to Economic-Politics)
- Recuerdos de un Revolucionario. (Memories of a Revolutionary)

Political offices
Preceded by Hernán Siles Zuazo	Vice President of Bolivia; 1956–1957	Succeeded by Vacant
