= Jaime Paz Zamora =

President of Bolivia from 1989 to 1993

Jaime Paz Zamora OCA OSP gcYC
- Official portrait, 1989

60th President of Bolivia
- In office 6 August 1989 – 6 August 1993
- Vice President: Luis Ossio
- Preceded by: Víctor Paz Estenssoro
- Succeeded by: Gonzalo Sánchez de Lozada

32nd Vice President of Bolivia
- In office 10 October 1982 – 14 December 1984
- President: Hernán Siles Zuazo
- Preceded by: Luis Adolfo Siles Salinas (1969)
- Succeeded by: Julio Garrett Ayllón (1985)

Personal details
- Born: 15 April 1939 (age 87) Cochabamba, Bolivia
- Party: Revolutionary Left Movement (1971–present) (Note: Lost registration in 2006.); Democratic and Popular Union (1977–1984); Patriotic Accord (1989–1997); MIR-FRI (2002–2005)
- Other political affiliations: Christian Democratic Party (2019)
- Spouse: Carmen Pereira Carballo (divorced)
- Children: 2, including Rodrigo

Jaime Paz Zamora (born 15 April 1939) is a Bolivian former politician who served as the 60th president of Bolivia from 1989 to 1993. He also served as the 32nd vice president of Bolivia from October 1982 to December 1984 during the presidency of Hernán Siles Zuazo. He is the nephew of former president Víctor Paz Estenssoro and father of current president Rodrigo Paz.

== Political career ==
=== Foundation of the MIR and alliance with Siles Zuazo ===
Jaime Paz Zamora studied Political Sciences at the Catholic University of Leuven in Belgium and became an ardent supporter of left-wing/progressive causes in the turbulent 1960s. Exiled by dictator Hugo Banzer in 1971, he co-founded in Chile the Revolutionary Left Movement (Movimiento de Izquierda Revolucionaria, MIR), originally a member of the Socialist International.

Soon, the MIR attracted the support of a large portion of the Marxist intelligentsia, especially university students. Upon returning to Bolivia in 1978, Paz's MIR cemented an alliance with the Movimiento Nacionalista Revolucionario de Izquierda of former President Hernán Siles. The result was the formation of the Unidad Democrática y Popular (UDP).

It was a mutually beneficial pact, since Siles offered everything the MIR lacked (experience and legitimacy with the working class stemming from the 1952 Revolution) while Paz, in turn, provided Siles what he did not have: the support of the university students and younger intellectuals.

=== The inconclusive 1978 and 1979 elections ===
The UDP participated in the June 1978 elections, with Siles at the head of the ticket and, by all accounts won a plurality. The vote was annulled, however, due to the discovery of massive fraud on behalf of the government endorsed candidate, General Juan Pereda. New elections were conducted in 1979. They, too, turned out to be a fiasco, as the UDP's Hernán Siles, with Paz as his vice-presidential running mate, finished first at the ballot box, but without attaining the 50% majority necessary for direct election. Thus, it was left to Congress to determine the next Chief Executive, as stipulated in the Bolivian Constitution. Surprisingly (or perhaps not, given the lack of democratic practice in Bolivia at that time) Congress could not agree on any candidate, no matter how many votes were taken. Eventually, Congress proclaimed as temporary President the head of the Senate, Dr. Wálter Guevara, pending the calling of yet a new round of elections in 1980.

=== The 1980 elections and vice presidency (1982–1985) ===
Ominously, the ultra-right wing of the Bolivian military began to intimate that it would never stand for the installation in the Palacio Quemado of the "extremist" Siles and Paz, but the 1980 campaign continued unabated. In April, the small rented plane in which Paz and a delegation of UDP politicians were traveling crashed in the Altiplano near La Paz, with the resulting death of all on board except the vice-presidential candidate. The plane had belonged to a company owned by Colonel Luis Arce, who would surface as Minister of Interior in the upcoming (and quite ruthless) military dictatorship of Luis Garcia Meza. No one doubts that it was an assassination attempt. In any case, Paz recovered from his burns and resumed campaigning, buoyed by the increasing support received in the aftermath of the "accident". The winner of this third vote in three years was, yet again, the Siles Zuazo-Paz Zamora formula. The two would have been sworn in, were it not for the July 17, 1980, coup of General Luis García Meza, which brutally interrupted the democratic process.

Paz fled to exile, but returned in 1982, when the military's experiment had run its course and the Bolivian economy was on the verge of collapse. With the reputation of the armed forces badly damaged by the excesses of the 1980–82 dictatorship, the only way out was a hasty retreat. In October 1982, the results of the 1980 elections following a congressional vote, and Siles was sworn in, with the MIR's Jaime Paz as his vice-president. The economic situation was dire indeed, and soon a galloping hyperinflationary process developed. Siles had great difficulty in controlling the situation. In all fairness, he received scant support from the political parties or members of congress, most of whom were eager to flex their newly acquired political muscles after so many years of authoritarianism. The unions, led by the old firebrand Juan Lechín paralyzed the government with constant strikes. At this point, the MIR (led by Paz) disassociated itself from the regime (1984), deserting the sinking ship when Siles' popularity sank to an all-time low. The 1982-85 hyperinflation would end up being the fourth largest ever recorded in the world.

=== Ideological revision (1985–1989) ===
By 1985, the government's impotence prompted Congress to call early elections, citing the fact that Siles had been originally elected five years before. Having broken with Siles, the MIR this time ran on its own, led by the ubiquitous Paz as its presidential candidate. Paz finished a respectable third, and the MNR's Víctor Paz Estenssoro was elected president (1985–89). During the 1985–1989 period, the MIR underwent major ideological transformations, with Paz and Oscar Eid advocating a break with Marxist notions and with any call for class-based struggle. These were the days of Perestroika, and the handwriting seemed to be on the wall (so to speak) for the Eastern European totalitarianisms. The MIR's programmatic shift entailed some major defections (most notable of which was that of Antonio Araníbar), but at least the party emerged more united and cohesive than it had been. It also had increased its electoral appeal considerably.

=== The 1989 election and the "Patriotic Accord" ===
Paz once more ran for president in May 1989. He finished third, although not far behind the top two vote-getters, Gonzalo Sánchez de Lozada and former dictator Hugo Banzer. As usual, no candidate received the 50% necessary for direct election, so Congress began deliberations to choose the next Head of State. Paz had vowed to never cooperate with Banzer, who had exiled and persecuted the MIR in the 1970s. But Banzer had broken acrimoniously with the MNR of the first-place finisher Sánchez de Lozada; when the opportunity for an alliance with Banzer materialized, Paz took it. It was a move that would cost him, and the MIR, everything in the years to come. On August 5, 1989, he was elected president by Congress—thanks to the political support received from General Banzer. This seemingly unlikely MIR-ADN (Banzer) entente was officially referred to as the "Patriotic Accord", with both leaders announcing the forgiveness of past enmities for the betterment of Bolivia and the consolidation of the as yet fragile democratic process. Many citizens were admired, others revolted.

=== Presidency (1989–1993) ===
The administration of Jaime Paz was rather successful. Limited by his alliance with Banzer (and perhaps by his own new convictions), the President "refrained" from attempting major transformations. He opposed the complete eradication of the coca leaf, as proposed by the U.S. administration of George H. W. Bush while cooperating with the main thrust of the so-called war on drugs. He advocated the potential medicinal and industrial use of coca, but achieved very little in the way of concrete results. His repeated pre-electoral statements about "rolling back" the neoliberal policies of his predecessor, Dr. Paz Estenssoro, came to nothing too, as the bulk of the privatization and de-statization reforms remained in place. Perhaps the high point of the Paz Zamora years on the domestic front had a lot to do with the president himself; it "centered" on the final qualification of Bolivia for the Soccer World Cup in 1993. The education, medical and general services were improved. On the other hand, corruption allegations disrupted his term; these would eventually lead to the jailing of his chief aide and MIR co-founder, Oscar Eid, for drug trafficking connections. He served his full four-year prison sentence.

In foreign policy, Paz did successfully negotiate the cession of a sovereign port on the Peruvian coast, although without territorial continuity from Bolivian territory its benefits proved rather limited. In 1990 and in 1992 his presidency restored non-diplomatic and unofficial relationships between the Republic of Bolivia and the Republic of China (Taiwan) through representative and commercial offices in La Paz (opened in 1990) and in Taipei (opened in 1992). Vice-president Sajines personally met with then-Taiwanese president Lee Teng Hui and expressed that his visit would increase the economic and technical cooperation between the Republic of China (Taiwan) and the Republic of Bolivia, and improve the friendship between the Bolivian and Taiwanese peoples.

=== Post-presidency ===
The MIR, and Paz, emerged from the 1989–93 considerably damaged, especially after Eid's incarceration. As per the stipulations of the "Patriotic Accord", the MIR supported Banzer in the 1993 presidential elections, but failed to have him elected in Congress, with the MNR's Gonzalo Sánchez de Lozada winning instead. Paz again ran for office in 1997 and in 2002, both times finishing fourth. All the while, the MIR's presence in Congress was diluted to a fraction of what it once was. Paz's latest participation in an election occurred in the 2005 Tarija Prefectural (the equivalent of a U.S. governorship) contest. Jaime Paz this time lost to the MNR's candidate, a man by the name of Cossío, who had been former President of the Bolivian Congress. This seems to have brought a rather sad end to a career marked by great expectations, many corruption scandals, never proved to be right and a share of electoral defeats. Perhaps Paz sealed his own fate when he signed the 1989 accord with General Banzer. The short-term benefits (the presidency) may not have been worth the long-term losses, especially as regards to legitimacy.

In October 2025, his son, Rodrigo Paz Pereira, won the presidential election, becoming new president of Bolivia. On 8 November 2025, Jaime Paz Zamora attended the swearing-in ceremony of his son in the Plurinational Legislative Assembly.

Party political offices
Preceded by Edil Sandoval Morón	Democratic and Popular Union nominee for Vice President of Bolivia; 1979, 1980	Alliance dissolved
New political party	Revolutionary Left Movement nominee for President of Bolivia; 1985, 1989, 1997, 2002	Succeeded by Hormando Vaca Díez; Withdrew
Preceded by Jorge Quiroga	Christian Democratic Party nominee for President of Bolivia; Withdrew; 2019	Succeeded by Chi Hyun Chung
Political offices
Vacant Title last held by Luis Adolfo Siles Salinas	Vice President of Bolivia; 1982–1984	Vacant Title next held by Julio Garrett Ayllón
Preceded by Víctor Paz Estenssoro	President of Bolivia; 1989–1993	Succeeded by Gonzalo Sánchez de Lozada
