= Banner of Gold =

The Banner of Gold (Spanish: Bandera de Oro) is a state decoration in Bolivia. It is the highest decoration awarded by the Senate of Bolivia, awarded to Bolivian and international individuals and institutions as a recognition of their contributions to human values and service to society.

In November 2008, the award was presented to the folkloric musical group Los Kjarkas and that same year former Senator Benjamín Miguel Harb received it.

In March 2009, Sōka Gakkai International was awarded the Banner of Gold. In the same month, the Senate awarded the decoration to the governments of Cuba and Venezuela, in recognition of their contributions in education and health sectors in Bolivia (such as the programmes Yo, sí puedo and Misión Milagro).
