= Social Democratic Power =

Bolivian political party

Social Democratic Power Poder Democrático Social
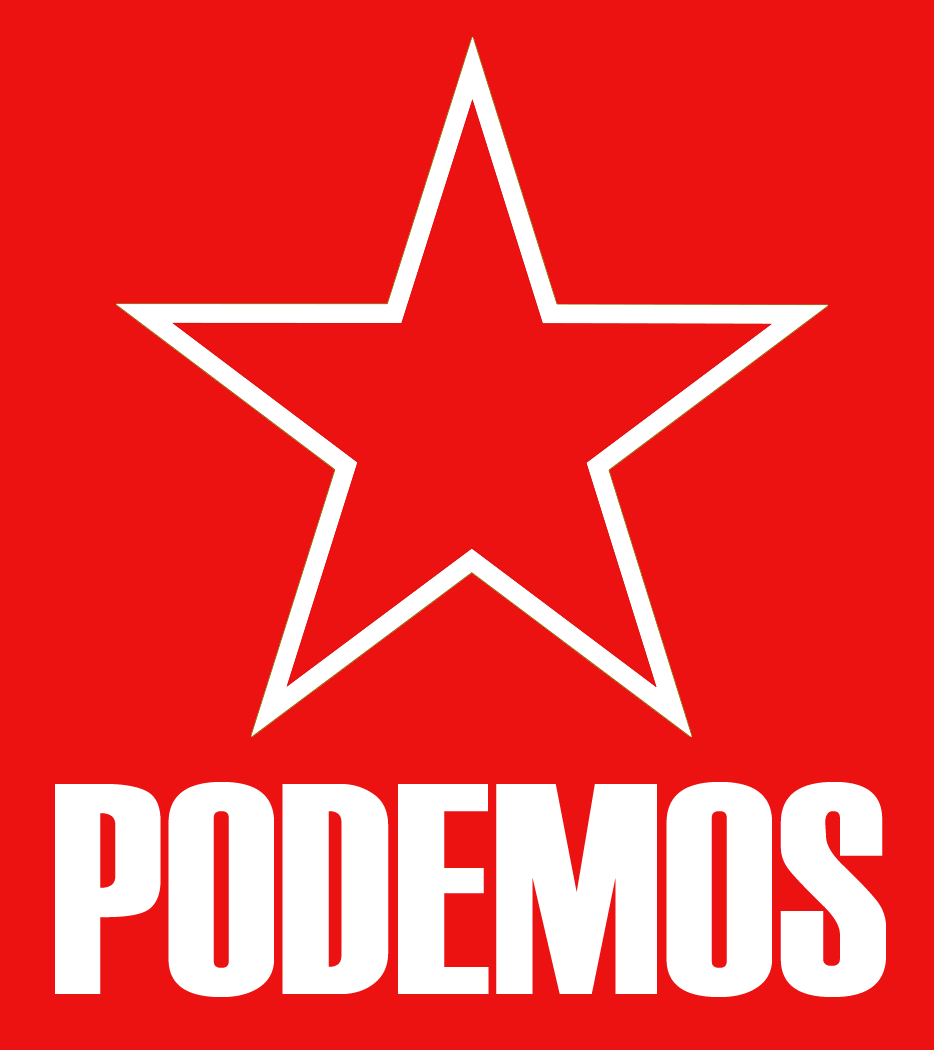
- Abbreviation: PODEMOS
- President: Jorge Quiroga
- Founded: 2005
- Dissolved: 2008
- Headquarters: La Paz
- Ideology: Nationalism; Economic liberalism Conservatism
- Political position: Right-wing
- International affiliation: International Democrat Union
- Regional affiliation: Union of Latin American Parties
- Colours: Red

The Social Democratic Power (Spanish: Poder Democrático Social, PODEMOS) was a Bolivian political alliance led by former President Jorge Quiroga and composed of the Nationalist Democratic Action (ADN) and the Christian Democratic Party (PDC).

It was established prior to the 2005 general elections, winning 28,59% of the votes and became the official opposition to the government of left-wing President Evo Morales and his Movement for Socialism (MAS).

The ADN withdrew from the alliance in 2006 and Quiroga eventually decided not to stand in the 2009 general election. It was delisted from the register of political parties in 2008 due to bureaucratic reasons and was dissolved in 2009.

Former President of the Senate Óscar Ortiz was part of the alliance, but later left it to establish Popular Consensus, which endorsed Samuel Doria Medina in the 2009 election.
