= National Civic Union (Bolivia) =

Bolivian political party

The National Civic Union (Spanish: Unión Cívica Nacional, UCN) was a small centrist political party in Bolivia.

The National Civic Union was founded in 1964. This party of recent origin was allegedly financed by the government of Víctor Paz Estenssoro to provide a token opposition, because other opposition parties boycotted the election on 31 May 1964.

The National Civic Union presented any candidates for the 10 Senate and 36 Chamber of Deputies seats up for election, but it garnered only a negligible vote.
