= Anti-Communist Bolivian Front =

Bolivian political party in 1964

The Anti-Communist Bolivian Front (Spanish: Frente Boliviano Anticomunista, FBA) was a small right-wing political party in Bolivia.

The Anti-Communist Bolivian Front was formed in 1964. This party of recent origin was allegedly financed by the government of Víctor Paz Estenssoro to provide a token opposition, because other opposition parties boycotted the election on 31 May 1964.

The Anti-Communist Bolivian Front presented many candidates for the 10 Senate and 36 Chamber of Deputies seats up for election, but it garnered only a negligible vote.

After the coup d'état on 4 November 1964 the Anti-Communist Bolivian Front disappeared.
