= Left-wing Revolutionary Nationalist Movement – 1 =

Left-wing Revolutionary Nationalist Movement - 1 Movimiento Nacionalista Revolucionario de Izquierda - 1
- Leader: Francisco Figueroa
- Colours: pink, brown

The Left-wing Revolutionary Nationalist Movement – 1 (Spanish: Movimiento Nacionalista Revolucionario de Izquierda-1, abbreviated MNRI-1) was a political party in Bolivia, that emerged as a splinter-group of the Left-wing Revolutionary Nationalist Movement (MNRI) ahead of the 1985 elections. MNRI-1 was formed by a peasant sector. The presidential candidate of MNRI-1 was Francisco Figueroa and their candidate for vice president was Marcos Chuquimia. The Figueroa-Chuquimia ticket obtained 11,696 votes (0.78% of the national vote).

MNRI-1 disappeared shortly after the elections. In December 1984 it had changed name to Revolutionary Alliance Movement (Movimiento de la Alianza Revolucionaria, MAR). MAR proclaimed itself as the sole genuine left-wing party in the country, denouncing the Democratic and Popular Union as 'bourgeois'.
