= Benjamín Miguel Harb =

Bolivian politician (1926–2008)

Benjamín Miguel Harb (October 18 1926 - December 10 2008) was a Bolivian politician and lawyer.

Miguel Harb obtained a licenciatura in philosophy. He also obtained a post-graduate degree in international politics from the International University, Rome, Italy.

In 1954 he took part in founding the Christian Democratic Party (PDC). In 1962 he became a parliamentarian, elected as a PDC candidate. He would lead the party as its president between 1969 and 1978.

He became the president of the National Social Security Fund in 1966. Between 1969 and 1971 he was the dean at the Faculty of Law, UMSA, La Paz. He was a docente at the Catholic University of Bolivia 1974-1975.

He was detained in January 1974, after having criticized the economic policies of the military dictator Hugo Banzer. In May 1974, three months after he had been conditionally released from captivity, he was forcefully expelled from Bolivia and deported to Paraguay.

Miguel Harb was the vice-presidential candidate of Luis Adolfo Siles Salinas in the 1979 elections.

Miguel Harb served as a senator 1979 to 1980. He was again a parliamentarian between 1982 and 1989. Between 1982 and 1983 he was the mayor of La Paz. 1983 to 1984 he was the Minister Secretary of the Presidency.

He served as an expert at the United Nations in the Commission of Crime Prevention and Penal Justice between 1987 and 1993.

Miguel Harb returned to parliament in 1993, elected on behalf of the ADN-PDC alliance. He was re-elected to the Chamber of Deputies in 1997, through the proportional representation vote in La Paz as a Christian Democratic Party candidate. His alternate was Fernando R. Rojas Alaiza.

Miguel Harb died in December 2008 due to heart failure. Following his death the Senate of Bolivia decided unanimously to grant him its highest honour, the Banner of Gold. The municipal council of La Paz decided to suspend all activities for three days in his honour.
