= Patriotic Accord =

Political alliance in Bolivia

Patriotic Accord Acuerdo Patriótico
- Abbreviation: AP
- Leader: Hugo Banzer; Jaime Paz Zamora
- Founded: 1989
- Dissolved: 1993
- Merger of: Nationalist Democratic Action; Revolutionary Left Movement

The Patriotic Accord (Spanish: Acuerdo Patriótico; AP) was an electoral and political alliance in Bolivia. Formed in 1989, it primarily consisted of Nationalist Democratic Action and the Revolutionary Left Movement, alongside other minor parties. The alliance was led by Hugo Banzer and Jaime Paz Zamora. In the 1993 Bolivian general election it received 21.1% of the vote.
