= Juan Lechín =

Bolivian trade unionist and politician (1914–2001)

Juan Lechín OCA
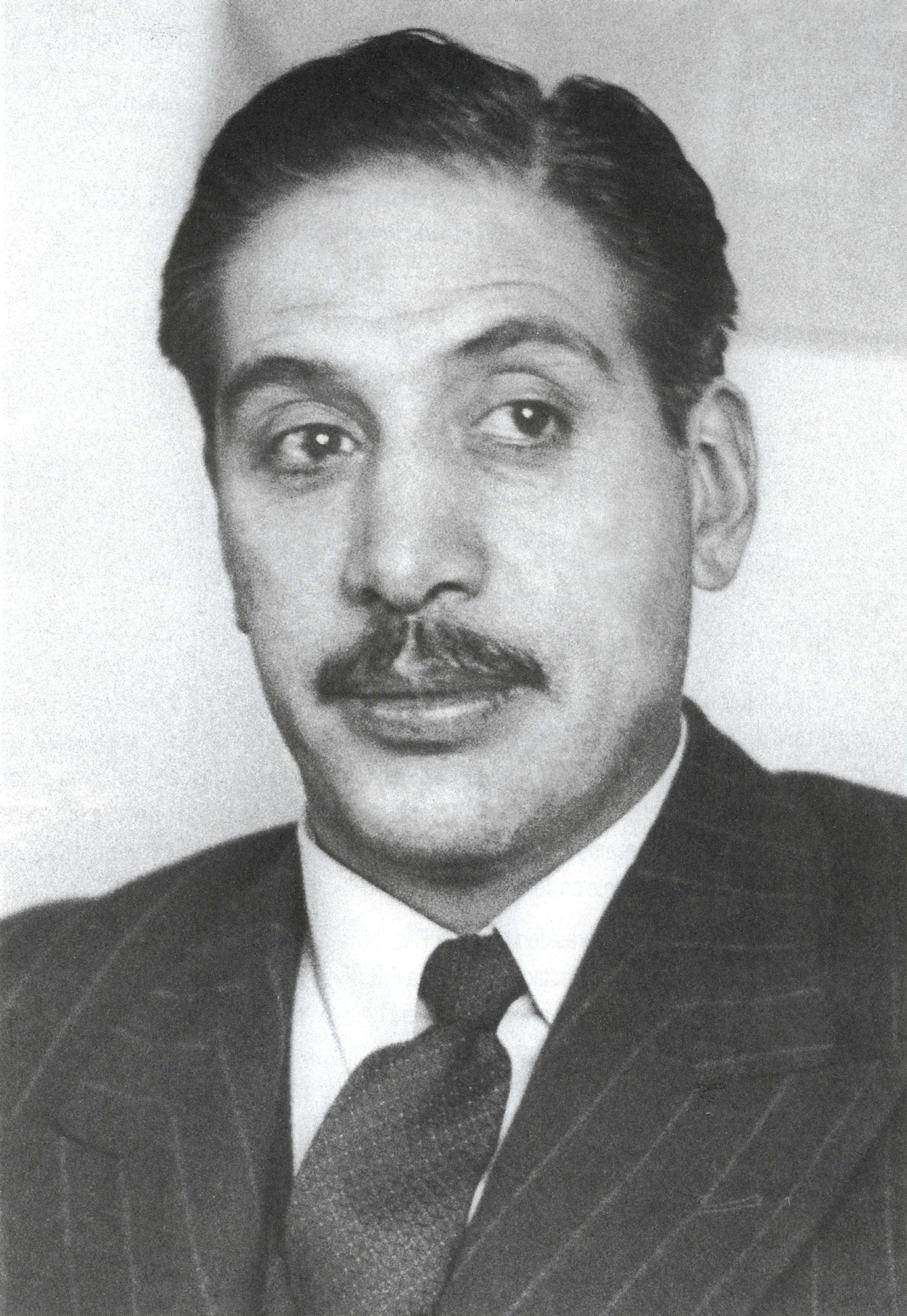
- Portrait of Lechín, c. 1960–1964

Executive Secretary of the Bolivian Workers' Center
- In office 18 July 1952 – 18 July 1987
- Preceded by: Office established
- Succeeded by: Simón Reyes
Other offices
29th Vice President of Bolivia
In office 6 August 1960 – 6 August 1964
President	Víctor Paz Estenssoro
Preceded by	Ñuflo Chávez (1957)
Succeeded by	René Barrientos
Minister of Mining and Petroleum
In office 12 April 1952 – 8 October 1954
President	Víctor Paz Estenssoro
Preceded by	Office established
Succeeded by	Mario Torres

Personal details
- Born: Juan Lechín Oquendo; 18 May 1914 Coro Coro, La Paz, Bolivia
- Died: 27 August 2001 (aged 87) La Paz, Bolivia
- Party: Revolutionary Party of the Nationalist Left (1963–1989)
- Other political affiliations: Revolutionary Nationalist Movement (before 1963)
- Spouse: Coca Weise
- Children: Juan Claudio
- Relatives: Juan Lechín Suárez (half-brother)
- Occupation: Politician; trade unionist

Juan Lechín Oquendo (Note: In this Spanish name, the first or paternal surname is Lechín and the second or maternal family name is Oquendo.) (18 May 1914 – 27 August 2001) was a Bolivian politician and trade unionist who served as executive secretary of the Bolivian Workers' Center from 1952 to 1987. He also served as minister of mining from 1952 to 1954 and as the 29th vice president of Bolivia from 1960 to 1964.

Born in Coro Coro, Lechín was radicalized by his experience as a laborer in the Catavi mine and combatant in the Chaco War. He founded the Syndical Federation of Bolivian Mineworkers in 1944 and the Bolivian Workers' Center in 1952, leading both organizations for decades as executive secretary. He fought in the Bolivian National Revolution and served as minister of mining under Víctor Paz Estenssoro from 1952 to 1954.

Lechín led the radical left wing of the Revolutionary Nationalist Movement, opposed to the more conservative bent of Hernán Siles Zuazo. In 1960, he was elected vice president alongside Paz Estenssoro, but broke with the president and founded the Revolutionary Party of the Nationalist Left in 1963. He backed a coup d'état led by René Barrientos in 1964 but was forced into exile the following year. Upon his return, Lechín was elected president of the Popular Assembly in 1971, which attempted radical reforms to the government structure.

Expelled again in 1972, Lechín remained in exile throughout the dictatorship of Hugo Banzer and returned during the democratic transition. He ran for president in the 1980 election but dropped out and was deported by the Luis García Meza regime. Following the return to democracy in 1982, Lechín led a vigorous opposition that crippled the Siles administration and challenged the neoliberalism of Paz Estenssoro. Amid the decline of the labor movement, Lechín resigned his trade union roles in 1987 and retired from public life. He died in 2001.

== Early life ==
Lechín was born to a Syrian immigrant father and a Bolivian-Lebanese mother in Corocoro, a city in the Department of La Paz. He worked in the Catavi and Siglo XX tin mines, both of which were owned by the mining tycoon Simón Iturri Patiño. While working as a machinist in the mines, he was made aware of the desperate conditions of the vast majority of the highland workers.

== Career and labor activism ==
In the 1940s he became involved in the nascent labor movement and joined the Revolutionary Workers' Party (POR), a Trotskyist political party.

In 1944, Lechín led a congress of miners in Huanuni, Oruro, that led to the formation of the FSTMB. Lechín was elected the union's Executive Secretary. At this point, he became affiliated with the Revolutionary Nationalist Movement (MNR), though he maintained good relations with the Trotskyist POR.

Following the 1952 Bolivian National Revolution, Lechín was chosen as Minister of Mines and Petroleum (1952-1956). He also led the founding congress of the Central Obrera Boliviana (COB), an umbrella federation of labor unions, and was elected its Executive Secretary. Since he had played a vital role in the Revolution, and had advocated the permanent extension of weapons to the workers' militias to guarantee regime stability against the possibility of an oligarchic/military backlash, he became extremely popular with the poorer sectors of society. Indeed, he was the most charismatic and popular MNR leader other than Víctor Paz Estenssoro. In addition, he was of far more radical political persuasion (Marxist-inspired) than the rest of the government leadership. This inevitably led to growing intra-party tensions and disagreements over labor issues and personal ambitions. He was elected to the Senate of Bolivia from 1956 to 1960.

In frank disagreement with what he saw as the increasingly conservative policies of president Hernán Siles Zuazo, by the late 1950s Lechín had begun to form a left-wing opposition within the ruling party. To reduce these tensions and prevent fragmentation, Paz was persuaded to return from retirement and lead the MNR in the 1960 presidential elections. The conciliatory Paz chose Lechín as his vice-presidential candidate, apparently with a promise that Lechín would be the presidential candidate in 1964. Lechín took the office of Vice President after the elections. However, he was "exiled" as ambassador to Italy from December 1962 to November 1963.

Instead, Lechín's intransigence on political issues eventually convinced Paz not only to renege on his promise but also to expel vice-president Lechín from the MNR at its 1964 convention. At that point, Lechín formed the Revolutionary Party of the National Left (PRIN).

=== Repeated exile ===
Rather surprisingly, Juan Lechín—the firebrand of the left—supported the 1964 military coup that toppled the MNR from power. Soon thereafter, however, he was forced into exile. He returned in 1971 and was elected as head of the Popular Assembly, a revolutionary congress endorsed by the reform-minded general Juan José Torres. Once more Lechín's role was polarizing, as he attempted to create a parallel (union and Assembly-based, quite reminiscent of soviets) alternative to the established order. After the Torres's overthrow later that year, Lechín was exiled once again and did not return until the democratic opening of 1978. By then the years had caught up with him and he had lost much luster and electoral appeal on a nationwide basis. He remained extremely popular with the miners, however, and once more he was elected to lead them and to chair the powerful COB. In 1980 he was the PRIN candidate for President and fared rather poorly at the polls, but in any case another military coup (this time led by Luis Garcia Meza) forced him into exile a third time.

=== Transition to democracy ===
When democracy was restored in 1982, Lechín and the other leaders of the FSTMB and COB returned to the political arena. In his restored position as top labor leader in the country, he strongly criticized the economic policies of president Hernán Siles Zuazo (1982–85), coming close to toppling his beleaguered regime with crippling strikes and other non-cooperation measures. Lechín also vigorously opposed the neoliberal administration of Víctor Paz Estenssoro, who served his fourth term from 1985 to 1989.

The closure of most of the country's tin mines by Paz Estenssoro (due to declining production and the collapse of world prices) led to considerable in-fighting in the unions. In 1987, Lechín—now aged 73—retired from the leadership of the FSTMB and was voted out as head of the COB. He was replaced in the FSTMB by Filemón Escobar and by Genaro Flores in the COB.

Juan Lechín Oquendo died in August 2001, at the age of 87.

== Legacy ==
A controversial but undeniably important historical figure, Lechín was reviled by many and followed almost blindly by others. A major criticism used against him is that he tended to de-stabilize precisely those regimes that were friendliest to the interests of the working class (Paz Estenssoro, Torres, Siles Zuazo between 1982 and 1985), while being quite deferential to the most hardline right-wing governments (Barrientos, Banzer, Garcia Mesa), at least until he could get safely out of the country.

== Notes ==
Political offices
Preceded by Vacant	Vice President of Bolivia; 1960–1964	Succeeded by René Barrientos Ortuño
