= 1960 Bolivian general election =

General elections were held in Bolivia on 5 June 1960. Víctor Paz Estenssoro of the Revolutionary Nationalist Movement (MNR) was elected President with 76% of the vote, whilst the MNR retained its large majority in Congress.

== Results ==
Party	Presidential candidate	Votes	%	Seats					
Party	Presidential candidate	Votes	%	Chamber			Senate		
Party	Presidential candidate	Votes	%	Elected	Total	+/–	Elected	Total	+/–
Revolutionary Nationalist Movement	Víctor Paz Estenssoro	735,619	76.10	32	51	–14	6	18	0
Authentic Revolutionary Party	Wálter Guevara	139,713	14.45	1	14	New	0	0	New
Bolivian Socialist Falange	Mario Gutiérrez	78,963	8.17	1	3	0	0	0	0
Communist Party	Víctor Paz Estenssoro	10,934	1.13	0	0	0	0	0	0
Revolutionary Workers' Party	Hugo Gonzales Moscoso	1,420	0.15	0	0	0	0	0	0
Total		966,649	100	34	68	0	6	18	0
Valid votes		966,649	97.87						
Invalid/blank votes		21,081	1.62						
Total		987,730	100						
Registered voters/turnout		1,300,000	75.98						
Source: Nohlen
