= Plurinational Legislative Assembly =

Bicameral legislature of Bolivia

Coordinates: 16°29′46″S 68°07′59″W

Plurinational Legislative Assembly Asamblea Legislativa Plurinacional

Type
- Type: Bicameral
- Houses: Chamber of Senators, Chamber of Deputies

History
- Founded: 1825 unicameral, 1831 bicameral

Leadership
- President of the Plurinational Legislative Assembly (ex oficio as Vice President): Edmand Lara, PDC since 8 November 2025
- President of the Senate: Diego Ávila, PDC since 6 November 2025
- President of the Chamber of Deputies: Roberto Castro Salazar, PDC since 6 November 2025

Structure
- Seats: 166; 36 Senators; 130 Deputies
- Chamber of Senators political groups: Government (23): PDC (16) (Note: First The People (1); Independent (15)); Unity (7) (Note: National Unity Front (3); Creemos (1); Revolutionary Nationalist Movement (1); Independent (2)); Supported by (13): Libre (12) (Note: Social Democratic Movement (2); Integration Column (1); Independent (9)); APB Súmate (1) (Note: APB Súmate (1))
- Chamber of Deputies political groups: Government (75): PDC (49) (Note: Christian Democratic Party (2); Movimiento al Socialismo (1); Sovereign for La Paz (1); Democratic Way to Change (1); New Patriotic Generation (1); Independent (43)); Unity (26) (Note: National Unity Front (5); Creemos (3); Movimiento Vida (1); Together (1); Independent (16)); Supported by (44): Libre (39) (Note: Revolutionary Left Front (4); Social Democratic Movement (3); Independent (32)); APB Súmate (5) (Note: APB Súmate (2); Independent (3)); Opposition (11): AP (8) (Note: Third System Movement (2); Movimiento al Socialismo (1); Independent (5)); MAS-IPSP (2) (Note: Movimiento al Socialismo (1); Independent (1)); Bia Yuqui (1) (Note: Independent (1))

Elections
- Chamber of Senators voting system: Party-list proportional representation
- Chamber of Deputies voting system: Two vote seat linkage compensation mixed electoral system (Mixed-member proportional representation) with DSV
- Last Chamber of Senators election: 17 August 2025
- Last Chamber of Deputies election: 17 August 2025

Meeting place
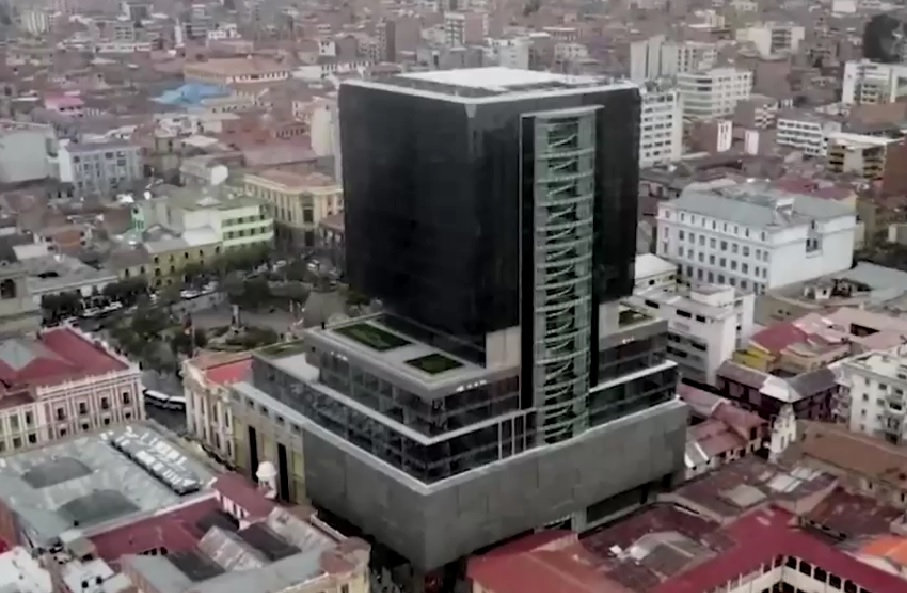
- New headquarters of the Plurinational Legislative Assembly; La Paz, Bolivia

Website
- https://web.senado.gob.bo/ http://www.diputados.bo

The Plurinational Legislative Assembly (Spanish: Asamblea Legislativa Plurinacional; ALP), formerly known as the National Congress (Spanish: Congreso Nacional), is the legislative branch of the national government of Bolivia. It is a bicameral legislature, including a lower chamber, the Chamber of Deputies, and an upper chamber, the Senate. They both meet in La Paz, the seat of government.

The vice president of Bolivia acts ex officio as the president of the Plurinational Legislative Assembly. The legislature has a total 350 members: 36 senators, 130 deputies, 9 supranational representatives, and their corresponding substitutes.

Each of the country's nine departments returns four senators elected by proportional representation (using the D'Hondt method). (From 1985 to 2009, the Senate had 27 seats: three seats per department: two from the party or formula that receives the most votes, with the third senator representing the second-placed party.) Senators are elected from party lists to serve five-year terms, and the minimum age to hold a Senate seat is 35 years.

The Chamber of Deputies comprises 130 seats, elected using a seat linkage based mixed compensatory system (for mixed-member proportional representation): 70 deputies are elected to represent single-member electoral districts, 7 of which are Indigenous or Campesino seats elected by the usos y costumbres of minority groups, 60 are elected from party lists on a departmental basis. Deputies also serve five-year terms, and must be aged at least 25 on the day of the election. Party lists are required to alternate between men and women, and in the single-member districts, men are required to run with a female alternate, and vice versa. At least 50% of the deputies from single-member districts are required to be women.

Both the Chamber of Senators, and the proportional part of the Chamber of Deputies is elected based on the vote for the presidential candidates, while the deputies from the single-member districts are elected separately.

== Buildings ==
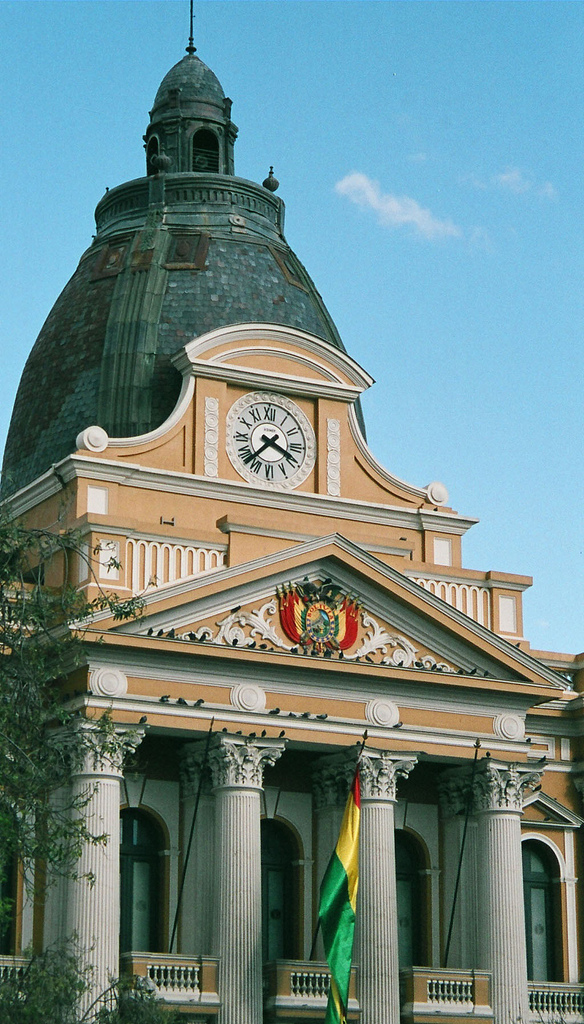
Government Palace of Bolivia in downtown La Paz.

The two chambers of Congress meet in the legislative palace located on Plaza Murillo, La Paz's main city-centre square. Plaza Murillo is also flanked by the presidential palace (informally known as the Palacio Quemado – the "Burnt Palace" – on account of repeated attempts to raze it to the ground in the 19th century) and the cathedral of Nuestra Señora de La Paz. Prior to becoming the seat of the legislature in 1904, the congress building had, at different times, housed a convent and a university.

The Vice-President, in his capacity as President of Congress, has an imposing suite of offices on Calle Mercado in central La Paz. The building, designed by Emilio Villanueva, was erected during the 1920s and was originally intended to serve as the headquarters of Bolivia's central bank (Banco de la Nación Boliviana). Under Jaime Paz Zamora's 1989–1993 presidency, the building was reassigned to the vice-presidency, but the vice-presidential staff did not relocate entirely until major reconstruction and renovation work, starting in 1997, had been carried out. The Library of Congress and the National Congressional Archive are also located on the premises.

== See also ==
- President of the Chamber of Senators of Bolivia
- President of the Chamber of Deputies of Bolivia
- Politics of Bolivia
- List of legislatures by country
