= Bolivian Civic Action =

Bolivian political party

The Bolivian Civic Action (Spanish: Acción Cívica Boliviana, ACB) was a small conservative political party in Bolivia.

The Bolivian Civic Action was founded in 1951 under the patronage of Carlos Víctor Aramayo, proprietor of a powerful mining company and of the newspaper La Razón.

In the 1951 elections the ACB's presidential candidate was Guillermo Gutiérrez Vea Murguía; he polled 6,654 votes (05.28%) in the election.

In the 1964 elections the ACB's polled barely 7 votes.

In the 1970s the Bolivian Civic Action went out of existence.
