= Luis Ossio =

Bolivian politician

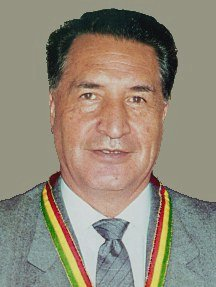
- Luis Ossio

34th Vice President of Bolivia
- In office August 6, 1989 – August 6, 1993
- President: Jaime Paz Zamora
- Preceded by: Julio Garrett Ayllón
- Succeeded by: Víctor Hugo Cárdenas

Personal details
- Born: Luis Ossio Sanjinés; 1930 Potosí, Bolivia
- Died: September 27, 2016 (aged 86)
- Party: Christian Democratic Party

Luis Ossio Sanjinés (1930 – September 27, 2016) served as the 34th vice president of Bolivia from 1989 to 1993, during the presidency of Jaime Paz Zamora. He belonged to the Christian Democratic Party (in Spanish: Partido Demócrata Cristiano (PDC)).

Ossio died at the age of 86 on September 27, 2016.

Political offices
Preceded by Julio Garrett Ayllón	Vice President of Bolivia; 1989–1993	Succeeded by Víctor Hugo Cárdenas
