= Víctor Paz Estenssoro =

President of Bolivia variously in the 20th century

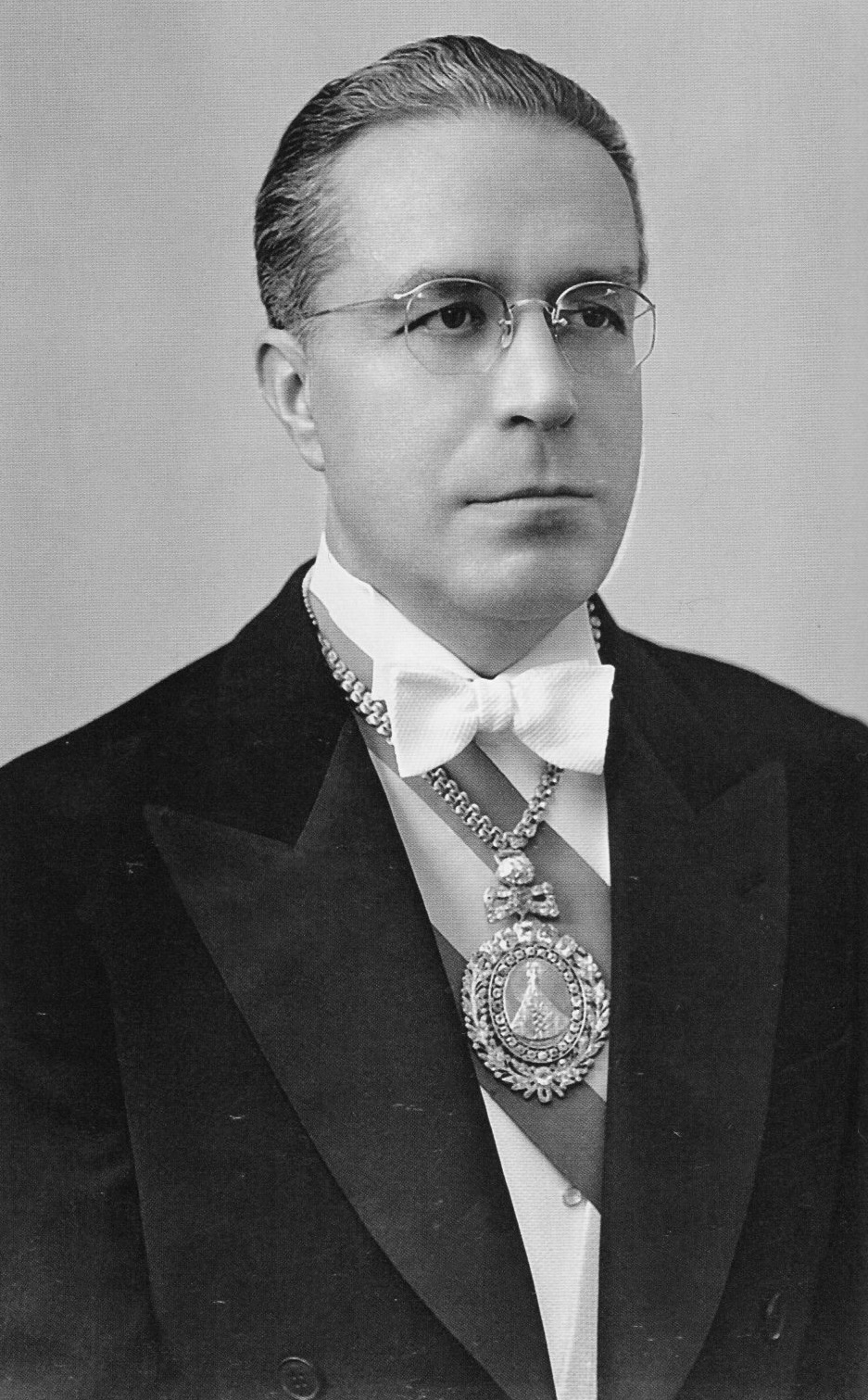
- Official photograph, 1964

45th President of Bolivia
- In office 6 August 1985 – 6 August 1989
- Vice President: Julio Garrett Ayllón
- Preceded by: Hernán Siles Zuazo
- Succeeded by: Jaime Paz Zamora
- In office 6 August 1960 – 4 November 1964
- Vice President: Juan Lechín (1960–1964); René Barrientos (1964)
- Preceded by: Hernán Siles Zuazo
- Succeeded by: René Barrientos
- In office 15 April 1952 – 6 August 1956
- Vice President: Hernán Siles Zuazo
- Preceded by: Hernán Siles Zuazo (interim)
- Succeeded by: Hernán Siles Zuazo

Minister of Finance and Statistics
- In office 31 December 1944 – 21 July 1946
- President: Gualberto Villarroel
- Preceded by: Jorge Zarco Kramer
- Succeeded by: Luis Gonsálvez Indaburo
- In office 20 December 1943 – 5 April 1944
- President: Gualberto Villarroel
- Preceded by: Germán Chávez
- Succeeded by: Jorge Zarco Kramer

Minister of Economy
- In office 12 June 1941 – 17 June 1941
- President: Enrique Peñaranda
- Preceded by: Office established
- Succeeded by: Alberto Crespo Gutiérrez

Personal details
- Born: Ángel Víctor Paz Estenssoro; 2 October 1907 Tarija, Bolivia
- Died: 7 June 2001 (aged 93) Tarija, Bolivia
- Party: Revolutionary Nationalist Movement (1942–2001)
- Other political affiliations: Independent Socialist (1938–1942)
- Spouse(s): Carmela Cerruto (died 1953) María Teresa Cortés (died 2020)
- Children: Miriam; Ramiro
- Parent(s): Domingo Paz Rojas; Carlota Estenssoro
- Relatives: Jaime Paz Zamora (second nephew); Rodrigo Paz Pereira (great nephew)
- Education: Higher University of San Andrés
- Awards: Order of the Condor of the Andes; Order of Merit of the Federal Republic of Germany; Order of Isabella the Catholic

Military service
- Allegiance: Bolivia
- Branch/service: Bolivian Army
- Years of service: 1934–1935
- Rank: Sergeant
- Battles/wars: Chaco War

Ángel Víctor Paz Estenssoro (2 October 1907 – 7 June 2001) was a Bolivian politician who served as the 45th president of Bolivia for three nonconsecutive and four total terms from 1952 to 1956, 1960 to 1964 and 1985 to 1989. He ran for president eight times (1947, 1951, 1960, 1964, 1978, 1979, 1980 and 1985) and was victorious in 1951, 1960, 1964 and 1985. His 1951 victory was annulled by a military junta led by Hugo Ballivián, and his 1964 victory was interrupted by the 1964 Bolivian coup d'état.

Paz Estenssoro's nephew Jaime Paz Zamora and grand-nephew Rodrigo Paz would go on to be the 60th and 68th presidents of Bolivia, respectively.

== Early life and education ==
Paz Estenssoro was born 2 October 1907 to a landowning family in Tarija. His father was a banker. He spent his childhood in Tarija and Oruro. He studied economics and law at the Higher University of San Andrés in La Paz before receiving a law degree in 1927. He started working at the Ministry of Finance in 1932 and then fought in the Chaco War, obtaining the rank of artillery sergeant, before starting a teaching career in 1939.

== Political career ==
=== Founding of the MNR and early political years (1941–1952) ===
In 1941 Víctor Paz Estenssoro co-founded (along with Hernán Siles Zuazo and others) the Movimiento Nacionalista Revolucionario (Revolutionary Nationalist Movement, MNR), originally a reformist revolutionary movement and later a centrist party. Paz became finance minister in the cabinet of Colonel Gualberto Villarroel (1943–1946), but was forced out of that government and went into exile in Argentina as a result of pressure emanating from Washington. The United States was at the time involved in World War II, and suspected some members of the MNR leadership of harboring pro-fascist sympathies. Paz Estenssoro nonetheless ran for president in 1947, earning 3rd place, and again in 1951, when the MNR won the electoral contest, despite suffrage at the time being limited to a small, propertied segment of the population. The elections, however, were unilaterally annulled by the ultra-conservative government of Mamerto Urriolagoitía, and the MNR at that point went underground, coming to power after a popular national revolution the next year.

=== The 1952 Revolution, First government (1952–1956) ===
Among the structural reforms adopted by the Paz Estenssoro government was the extension of universal suffrage to all adult citizens (natives and illiterates included), the nationalization of the largest tin-mining concerns, and an extensive program of land distribution (agrarian reform). Much of the military, which had historically been aligned with Bolivia’s economic elites prior to the Revolution, was dismantled and re-organized as a virtual arm of the MNR party. Some observers have compared the MNR's centralization of power to Mexico’s Partido Revolucionario Institucional (Institutional Revolutionary Party, PRI). The crucial difference between the MNR and PRI was the decidedly de-centralised structure of the country's new military power (i.e., armed workers and peasants), which was largely overseen by the left-wing minority bloc in the MNR, headed by the Bolivian Workers' Center (COB) leader, Juan Lechín.

=== Temporary retirement and polarization of the MNR (1956–1960) ===
Paz Estenssoro was not allowed to run for another consecutive term, and Hernán Siles was elected, serving as President from 1956 until 1960. During the Siles administration, the MNR began to polarize and fragment, with a conservative wing led by Wálter Guevara and an increasingly assertive left-leaning faction commanded by the charismatic COB leader Lechín. To prevent the fracturing of his party, Paz returned from London (where he had been serving as Bolivian ambassador) and ran for re-election in 1960, winning with an ample majority of the votes. His choice as vice-presidential running mate was Juan Lechín, who became an increasingly influential and independent political figure, an action that prompted the defection from the MNR of Wálter Guevara, who felt he had been stepped over.

=== Second and third governments (1960–1964) ===
The second Paz Estenssoro administration experienced internal dissent, political violence, and the departure of several original leaders. Of great importance during this period was the thorny issue of disarming the miners and workers' militias who had combatted in the 1952 Revolution and who had been for the most allowed to keep their weapons since. They had served as a useful counterbalance to the possibility of a conservative or military reassertion against the Revolution, but by 1960 were serving the interests of the party's radical left vice-president Lechín. Of Marxist political persuasion, the latter opposed the disarming of the militias and the reconstitution of the traditional military, urged the passing of more far-reaching reforms. Paz Estenssoro disagreed and, continuing the policies started by Siles, increasingly leaned on the "new" armed forces for support. This produced the inevitable final rift, and Lechín was expelled from the party prior to the 1964 elections.

Facing increasing political challenges and opposition, and considering himself the only man who could keep the MNR coalition together, in 1964 Paz decided to amend the constitution to allow himself to run for re-election. Traditionally, attempts such as these (known as "prorroguismo") have been strongly condemned by the Bolivian political elites, many of whose members may have been waiting for their turn to occupy the presidential palace for years. This was no exception, and Paz's move ended up being his undoing. To symbolize Paz's steady rightward drift, he chose the charismatic commander of the Bolivian Air Force, General René Barrientos, as his running mate. Paz's increased reliance on the armed forces was to some extent influenced by Washington's constant demands that the military be fully reconstituted and equipped to fight possible Cuban-style Communist insurgencies. In any case, the choice of Barrientos was a controversial decision that some critics viewed as politically risky, as Paz did not seem to have noticed the deep resentment of the outwardly loyal commanders of the "new, revolutionary" military toward the MNR's manipulation of the armed forces for political ends.

=== The 1964 coup d'état and exile ===
On 4 November 1964, the MNR government was overthrown in a military coup led by vice-president Barrientos and Alfredo Ovando, commander of the army. Paz flew to a long exile in Lima, Peru, bitter toward his removal and critical of the direction of subsequent governments. It was not until 1982 (with minor and very temporary exceptions) that military rule ended. By this time Paz and Siles had split, with Siles supporting more leftist policies. Wálter Guevara, for his part, had supported Barrientos and served in his administration. In 1969 Barrientos died in a helicopter crash and new, populist military governments of progressive bend gained power in Bolivia (1970–1971).

=== Support for Banzer and erosion of support (1971–1978) ===
When the policies of the left-leaning Torres military government, which faced opposition from conservative sectors, Torres was overthrown in a bloody coup d'état led by then-Colonel Hugo Banzer with the MNR's full support. This too was a move that would cost Paz and his party dearly in the years to come, especially in future elections. Paz was apparently under the impression that Banzer would only rule temporarily before calling elections and, since the MNR was still the largest party in the country by some distance, this would allow Paz to return to the presidency. However, Banzer broke with the MNR in 1974, exiled Paz, and proceeded to rule only with military support until 1978.

During this time, Paz became a history teacher at the University of California, Los Angeles and the University of New Mexico.

=== The turmoil of 1978–1985 ===
While Paz had tarnished his image by associating himself with the military government of Hugo Banzer, which was widely criticized for human rights abuses, Hernán Siles was turning steadily to the left and gaining adherents at Paz's expense. When at long last elections were called in 1978, it was apparently Siles who won it (there were vast irregularities and the elections were annulled), with Paz getting only third place. It was a major decline from what the MNR had been used to obtaining in the 1950s and early 1960s. Elections were rescheduled for 1979, and when they took place Siles won again but this time Paz got second place. The elections again proved inconclusive, however, in as much as none of the candidates polled the required 50% of the vote to win direct election, and thus the outcome was to be decided by Congress. Partisan intransigences prevailed and the latter could not agree on any of the candidates, eventually settling on naming as provisional President the head of the senate, Wálter Guevara, then in alliance with Paz's MNR. He was charged with calling elections again in 1980. Those elections reconfirmed Siles' victory and Paz's second place, but the military intervened rather than allow Siles (now associated with parties deemed to be from the "far left") to take office. General Luis García Meza grabbed the reins of power in the bloody coup d'état of 17 July 1980, and Paz once more flew to exile. In 1982, the beleaguered military finally left the Palacio Quemado and confirmed the results of the 1980 elections, making Siles president.

Paz's MNR opposed Siles on every front, as his administration plunged the country into a hyperinflationary spiral. In fact, this was Bolivia's most serious economic crisis in its history, one largely prompted by the collapse of international tin prices and the onset of the Latin American debt crisis. The gravity of the situation prompted the National Congress to prevail upon Siles to call early elections in 1985. Paz again came second (this time to former dictator Hugo Banzer) but was elected president by Congress since, as usual, none of the parties had attained the 50% threshold for direct election. It was in fact the first time an opposition party gained power peacefully in a free election, even though there had long been multi-party competition in elections.

=== Fourth presidency (1985–1989) ===
The now-nearly octogenarian Paz began his fourth (and final) term as President in 1985. The economic situation was indeed dire, but Paz and his aides had a radical neo-liberal plan. Through Decree 21060 important economic reforms designed to curb galloping hyperinflation (inherited from Hernán Siles) were instituted, the labor unions were repressed in order to reestablish government authority, and 30,000 miners were expunged from state payrolls to reduce the size of the government. Up until the economic restructuring was announced, Paz and his planning team had not informed the rest of his cabinet or the public of the reforms, which they anticipated would prompt significant public protest. One member of Paz's economic team compared their approach to the bombing of Hiroshima with nuclear weapons. The reforms were in many ways the opposite of what Paz had represented to his voters. As a result, the policies were met with protest. In the months following the announcement of Decree 21060, a curfew was imposed on citizens, travel throughout the country restricted, universities and opposition meetings were raided, and hundreds of union leaders were kidnapped and taken to prison camps in the Amazon until strikes were called off.

The readjustment policies—conducted to a large extent by Paz Estenssoro's vigorous Minister of Planning, Gonzalo Sánchez de Lozada, who was later to serve as President of Bolivia—came to be known as the New Economic Policy (NEP). The latter restructured the bulk of the hitherto-statist Bolivian economy and transformed it into a neo-liberal, privatization-oriented one, and successfully contained hyperinflation. Despite economic stabilization, Bolivia continued to face widespread poverty, and opposition to liberal economic reforms grew, culminating in the election of socialist Evo Morales in 2005.

Paz finished his term and finally retired from politics upon leaving office in 1989.

== Personal life and death ==
Paz married twice. He had two children by his first wife, Carmela Cerruto, and three by his second spouse, Maria Teresa Cortez. He married Cortez, a former airline hostess, in 1955.

In his later years, Paz resided in Tarija and suffered a hip fracture and Parkinson's disease. He died on 7 June 2001 after suffering complications from surgery to repair a blood clot in his right leg that included its amputation.

== Sources ==
- Book Rags
- (in Spanish) Bolivian government profile of Paz Estenssoro
- Biography by CIDOB (in Spanish)

Political offices
New office	Minister of Economy; 1941	Succeeded by Alberto Crespo Gutiérrez
Preceded by Germán Chávez	Minister of Finance and Statistics; 1943–1944	Succeeded by Jorge Zarco Kramer
Preceded by Jorge Zarco Kramer	Minister of Finance and Statistics; 1944–1946	Vacant Title next held by Luis Gonsálvez Indaburo
Preceded by Hernán Siles Zuazo	President of Bolivia; 1952–1956	Succeeded by Hernán Siles Zuazo
Preceded by Hernán Siles Zuazo	President of Bolivia; 1960–1964	Vacant Government Junta Title next held by René Barrientos
Preceded by Hernán Siles Zuazo	President of Bolivia; 1985–1989	Succeeded by Jaime Paz Zamora
Party political offices
New political party	National Chief of the Revolutionary Nationalist Movement; 1942–1990	Succeeded by Gonzalo Sánchez de Lozada
New political party	Revolutionary Nationalist Movement nominee for President of Bolivia; 1947, 1951	Succeeded by Hernán Siles Zuazo
Preceded by Hernán Siles Zuazo	Revolutionary Nationalist Movement nominee for President of Bolivia; 1960, 1964, 1985	Succeeded by Gonzalo Sánchez de Lozada
New political alliance	Democratic Alliance of National Revolution nominee for President of Bolivia; 1978	Alliance dissolved
New political alliance	Revolutionary Nationalist Movement–Alliance nominee for President of Bolivia; 1979, 1980	Alliance dissolved
