= Revolutionary Nationalist Movement =

Revolutionary Nationalist Movement Movimiento Nacionalista Revolucionario
- National Chief: Johnny Torres Terzo
- Founder: Víctor Paz Estenssoro; Hernán Siles Zuazo; Carlos Montenegro; Wálter Guevara; José Cuadros Quiroga
- Founded: 7 June 1942; 84 years ago
- Preceded by: Independent Socialist Party
- Headquarters: Casa Rosada, Nicolás Acosta 574, San Pedro, La Paz
- Membership (2025): 78,775
- Ideology: Current: Liberal conservatism Federalism; Conservatism; Liberalism; Historical: Social democracy Left-wing nationalism Economic nationalism Left-wing populism Statism; Reformism; Revolutionary nationalism
- Political position: Current: Centre-right to right-wing Historical: Centre-left to left-wing
- National affiliation: Nationalist Popular Front (1971–1974); Nationalist Union of the People (1978); Revolutionary Nationalist Movement – Alliance (1979); Plan Progress for Bolivia – National Convergence (2009–2013); Libre 21 (2020)
- Continental affiliation: COPPPAL
- Colours: Pink
- Chamber of Deputies: 2 / 130
- Senate: 1 / 36

Party flag
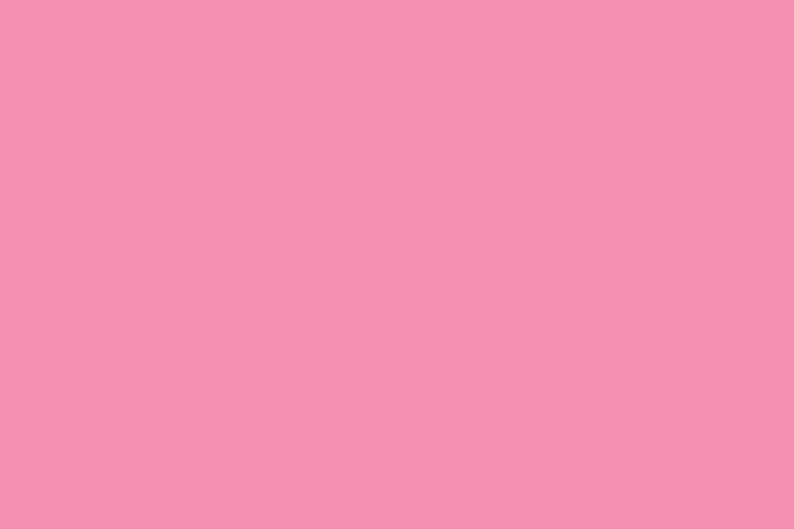

Website
- www.mnr.org.bo

The Revolutionary Nationalist Movement (Spanish: Movimiento Nacionalista Revolucionario, MNR) is a centre-right, conservative political party in Bolivia. It was the leading force behind the Bolivian National Revolution from 1952 to 1964. It influenced much of the country's history since 1941.

== Origins ==
The Revolutionary Nationalist Movement was begun in 1941 by future presidents Víctor Paz Estenssoro and Hernán Siles Zuazo. It soon attracted some of the brightest members of the Bolivian intelligentsia. Among the party's most prominent supporters were Humberto Guzmán Fricke, Juan Lechín, Carlos Montenegro, Walter Guevara Arze, Javier del Granado, Augusto Céspedes, Lydia Gueiler, Guillermo Bedregal, and Gonzalo Sánchez de Lozada, a number of whom later became presidents of Bolivia.

At the time of its establishment it was a leftist/reformist party, along the lines of similar Latin American parties such as the Brazilian Labour Party, the Socialist Party of Chile, the National Liberation Party in Costa Rica, Dominican Revolutionary Party, the Guatemalan Revolutionary Action Party, the Mexican Institutional Revolutionary Party, the American Popular Revolutionary Alliance in Peru, Democratic Action in Venezuela. The MNR first came to power in 1943, as supporters of the reformist military regime of Gualberto Villarroel.

== Bolivian National Revolution ==
The Revolutionary Nationalist Movement led the leftist Bolivian National Revolution of 1952 and ruled the country until 1964 when it was overthrown by the military coup of René Barrientos. During the presidencies of Paz Estenssoro (1952–56 and 1960–64) and Hernán Siles Zuazo (1956–60) were the top leaders of the Revolutionary period, establishing the universal vote, nationalizing the tin mines, and instituting an extensive agrarian reform. During this time many of the old elitist parties which had previously dominated Bolivian politics either disappeared or faded into irrelevance. This left the MNR in the center of the Bolivian political spectrum.

Siles and Paz split in the 1960s over Paz's ambitions and personal control of the party. Filled with many strong personalities, the party had in fact begun to fragment along political and personal lines since the late 1950s, with Wálter Guevara being the first to leave and the popular Juan Lechín being expelled in 1964. Siles went on to form the Revolutionary Nationalist Leftwing Movement (MNRI) and Lechín the Revolutionary Party of the Nationalist Left (PRIN).

== Further splits and return to democracy ==
Falling from power only deepened the intra-party squabbles. With the main body of the MNR firmly behind Paz Estenssoro, the old leader made what can be seen as a major mistake in 1971, when he supported the coup d'état of Hugo Banzer Suárez. He apparently believed that Banzer would only rule for a year or two before calling elections that the MNR would almost certainly win. If so, he badly miscalculated; Banzer exiled Paz in 1975. The main body supported Paz in exile, while a faction continued to back Banzer.

Paz' support of the Banzer dictatorship was a move that was to cost his party dearly at the polls in subsequent years. While Paz seemed to be moving steadily to the right, Siles Zuazo broke off to found the left-leaning Left-wing Revolutionary Nationalist Movement (MNRI) in 1971. Indeed, Siles was the post-MNR politician who was best able to capitalize on the remaining legitimacy and respect that MNR had as a result of the 1952 Revolution. Paz Estenssoro led the MNR-proper in the Bolivian general elections of 1978, 1979, and 1980 elections, finishing third, second, and second, respectively.

Led by Sánchez de Lozada, the MNR won the 1993 elections and Sanchez was confirmed as president by parliament. He continued the policies of the NEP. The party placed second in 1997 elections, with the presidential candidate Juan Carlos Durán (at the time, the Bolivian constitution prohibited direct re-election of a sitting president) losing to the former dictator Banzer.

=== 21st century ===
At the legislative elections 2002 MNR in alliance with Free Bolivia Movement, won 26.9% of the popular vote and 36 out of 130 seats in the Chamber of Deputies and 11 out of 27 in the Senate. Following these elections, because no presidential candidate had received a majority, the Congress chose the President, and they again elected Sánchez de Lozada. After the 2002 elections, the party ruled in a coalition with the Revolutionary Left Movement. In 2003 Sanchez was forced to resign, and his successor, independent candidate Carlos Mesa took over in hopes of promoting national unity in the face of nationwide protests. Mesa soon resigned and presidential elections were scheduled for December 2005. In these elections MNR received only 6.5% of the popular vote and won 7 out of 130 seats in the Chamber of Deputies and 1 out of 27 seats in the Senate. Its candidate in the presidential elections was Michiaki Nagatani, whose poor performance demonstrated a steep decline in the fortunes of the party as the Bolivian political scene began to be dominated by Evo Morales.

For the 2009 elections, the MNR was a component of the Plan Progress for Bolivia – National Convergence. The party's future is uncertain as it is no longer represented in the parliament and its last government has been tarnished by serious accusations of corruption, economic mismanagement and armed suppression of protesters.

The Revolutionary Nationalist Movement currently is led by Luis Eduardo Siles.

== Electoral history ==
=== Presidential elections ===
Election	Party candidate	Votes	%	Result
1947	Víctor Paz Estenssoro	5,194	5.56%	Lost ✗
1951	Víctor Paz Estenssoro	54,129	42.9%	Annulled ✗
1956	Hernán Siles Zuazo	787,792	84.4%	Elected ✓
1960	Víctor Paz Estenssoro	735,619	76.1%	Elected ✓
1964	Víctor Paz Estenssoro	1,114,717	97.9%	Elected ✓
1966	Víctor Andrade	88,099	8.7%	Lost ✗
1978	Víctor Paz Estenssoro	213,622	11.0%	Lost ✗
1979	Víctor Paz Estenssoro	527,184	35.9%	Lost ✗
1980	Víctor Paz Estenssoro	263,706	20.2%	Lost ✗
1985	Víctor Paz Estenssoro	456,704	30.4%	Elected ✓
1989	Gonzalo Sánchez de Lozada	363,113	25.6%	Lost ✗
1993	Gonzalo Sánchez de Lozada	585,837	35.6%	Elected ✓
1997	Juan Carlos Durán	396,235	18.2%	Lost ✗
2002	Gonzalo Sánchez de Lozada	624,126	22.5%	Elected ✓
2005	Michiaki Nagatani Morishita	185,859	6.5%	Lost ✗
2009	Endorsing Manfred Reyes Villa	1,212,795	26.5%	Lost ✗
2014	Endorsing Samuel Doria Medina	1,253,288	24.2%	Lost ✗
2019	Virginio Lema	42,334	0.7%	Lost ✗

=== Chamber of Deputies and Senate elections ===
Election	Votes	%	Chamber seats	+/–	Position	Senate seats	+/–	Position
1942			5 / 110	▲5	▲7th	0 / 27		
1944			56 / 137	▲51	▲1st	0 / 27		
1947			4 / 111	▼52	▼4th	1 / 27	▲1	▲4th
1949			9 / 111	▲5	▲3rd	1 / 27	Steady	▼5th
1956	787,792	84.4%	61 / 68	▲52	▲1st	18 / 18	▲17	▲1st
1960	735,619	76.1%	51 / 68	▼10	1st	18 / 18	Steady	1st
1962	886,572	84.7%	64 / 72	▲13	1st	27 / 27	▲16	1st
1964	1,114,717	97.9%	57 / 73	▼7	1st	22 / 27	▼5	1st
1966	88,099	8.7%	0 / 120	▼57	▼3rd	0 / 27	▼22	▼3rd
1979	527,184	35.9%	48 / 117	▲48	▲1st	16 / 27	▲16	▲1st
1980	263,706	20.2%	34 / 130	▼14	▼2nd	10 / 27	▼6	▼2nd
1985	456,704	30.4%	43 / 130	▲9	▲1st	16 / 27	▲6	▲1st
1989	363,113	25.6%	40 / 130	▼3	1st	9 / 27	▼7	1st
1993	585,837	35.6%	52 / 130	▲12	1st	17 / 27	▲8	1st
1997	396,235	18.2%	26 / 130	▼26	▼2nd	5 / 27	▼12	▼2nd
2002	624,126	22.5%	36 / 130	▲10	▲1st	11 / 27	▲6	▲1st
2005	185,859	6.47%	7 / 130	▼29	▼4th	1 / 27	▼10	▼4th
