= Katarism =

Bolivian political movement

Katarism (Spanish: Katarismo) is a political movement in Bolivia, named after the 18th-century indigenous leader Túpac Katari.

== Origins ==
The katarist movement began in the early 1970s, recovering a political identity of the Aymara people. The movement was centered on two key understandings, that the colonial legacy continued in the Latin American republics after independence and that the indigenous population constituted the demographic (and thus essentially, the political) majority in Bolivia. Katarism stresses that the indigenous peoples of Bolivia suffer both from class oppression (in the Marxist, economic sense) and ethnic oppression.

The agrarian reform of 1953 had enabled a group of Aymara youth to begin university studies in La Paz in the 1960s. In the city, this group faced prejudices, and katarist thoughts began to emerge among the students. The movement was inspired by the rhetoric of the national revolution as well as by Fausto Reinaga, writer and founder of the Indian Party of Bolivia. The group formed the Julian Apansa University Movement (MUJA), which organized around cultural demands, including bilingual education. Its most prominent leader was Jenaro Flores Santos (who in 1965 returned to the countryside to lead peasants). Another prominent figure was Raimundo Tambo.

== Emergence ==
At the 1971 Sixth National Peasant Congress, the congress of the National Peasants Confederation, the katarists emerged as a major faction against the pro-government forces. The 1973 Tolata massacre (in which at least 13 Quechua peasants were killed) radicalized the katarist movement. Following the massacre, the katarists issued the 1973 Tiwanaku Manifesto, which viewed Quechua people as economically exploited and culturally and politically oppressed. In this vision, peasant class consciousness and Aymara and Quechua ethnic consciousness were complementary because capitalism and colonialism were the root of exploitation.

== Political recognition ==
Katarism made its political breakthrough in the late 1970s through the leading role katarists played in CSUTCB. The katarists pushed the CSUTCB to become more indigenized. Eventually, the katarists split into two groups. The first, a more reformist strain, was led by Victor Hugo Cardenas, who later served as vice president under Gonzalo Sanchez de Lozada, heading efforts to institutionalize a neoliberal, state-led multiculturalism. A second strain articulated a path of Aymara nationalism. A political wing of the movement, the Tupaj Katari Revolutionary Movement (MRTK) was launched. This radical stream of katarism has been represented by Felipe Quispe (aka El Mallku), who took part in founding the Tupac Katari Guerrilla Army in the 1980s. This group later became the MIP (Pachakuti Indigenous Movement), outspoken critics of the neoliberal Washington Consensus which coalesced around ethnic-based solidarity. Quispe advocated the creation of a new sovereign country, the Republic of Quillasuyo, named after the southern region of the Inca Empire where the Incas conquered the Aymara. The former Vice President of Bolivia under Evo Morales, Álvaro García Linera, was a member of this group.

== Decline ==
Katarist organizations were weakened during the 1980s. In this context NGOs began to appropriate katarist symbols. Populist parties, such as CONDEPA, also began to integrate katarist symbols in their discourse. After the Revolutionary Nationalist Movement (MNR) had incorporated katarist themes in its 1993 election campaign and elected katarist Víctor Hugo Cárdenas as vice president, other mainstream parties followed suit (most notably the Revolutionary Left Movement). Jenaro Flores Santos ran as the vice presidential candidate of United Left. By 2000 katarist parties disappeared. In the late 1990s, two new indigenist parties Movimiento al Socialismo and Pachakuti Indigenous Movement which gained far more support than their katarist predecessors.

Elections results of Katarist parties
Party	1978		1979		1980		1985		1989		1993	
Party	Votes	%	Votes	%	Votes	%	Votes	%	Votes	%	Votes	%
MITKA	12,207	0.63	28,344	1.93	15,852	1.21	—N/a					
MITKA-1	—N/a				17,023	1.30	—N/a					
MRTKL	—N/a						31,678	2.11	22,983	1.62	—N/a	
FULKA	—N/a								16,416	1.16	—N/a	
Pachakuti Axis	—N/a										18,176	1.10
MKN	—N/a										12,627	0.77
Total	12,207	0.63	28,344	1.93	33,002	2.52	31,678	2.11	39,399	2.78	30,803	1.87

== See also ==
- LAVAUD, Jean-Pierre. Le courant Tupac Katari en Bolivie. Document de Travail n° 24 1982. Centre national de la recherche scientifique (in French).

== Works cited ==
- Canessa, Andrew (2000). "Contesting Hybridity: Evangelistas and Kataristas in Highland Bolivia". Journal of Latin American Studies. 32 (1): 115–144.
- Sanjinés C., Javier. Mestizaje Upside-Down: Aesthetic Politics in Modern Bolivia. Illuminations. Pittsburgh: University of Pittsburgh Press, 2004.
- Schelling, Vivian. Through the Kaleidoscope: The Experience of Modernity in Latin America. Critical studies in Latin American and Iberian cultures. London [u.a.]: Verso, 2001.
- Stern, Steve J. Resistance, Rebellion, and Consciousness in the Andean Peasant World, 18th to 20th Centuries. Madison, Wis: University of Wisconsin Press, 1987.
- Van Cott, Donna Lee. From Movements to Parties in Latin America: The Evolution of Ethnic Politics. Cambridge: Cambridge University Press, 2007.
