= Movimiento al Socialismo =

Political party in Bolivia

Movement Toward Socialism Movimiento al Socialismo
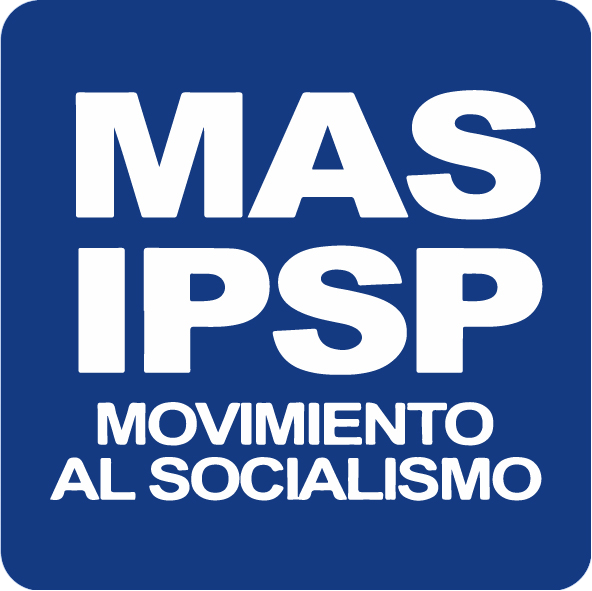
- Abbreviation: MAS-IPSP
- President: Grover García
- Vice President: Julia Ramos
- Founder: Filemon Escobar
- Founded: 22 July 1997; 29 years ago
- Split from: Assembly for the Sovereignty of the Peoples
- Headquarters: Benedicto Vincenti Nº 960, Sopocachi, La Paz
- Membership (Feb 2025): 1,082,645
- Ideology: Democratic socialism; Left-wing populism; Indigenismo; Left-wing nationalism; Progressivism
- Political position: Left-wing
- Regional affiliation: São Paulo Forum
- International affiliation: Progressive Alliance
- Colors: Blue
- Senate: 0 / 36
- Deputies: 2 / 130
- Governorships: 1 / 9
- Mayors: 12 / 340
- Andean Parliament: 0 / 5

Party flag

Website
- mas-ipsp.org/hoy/

The Movement Toward Socialism – Political Instrument for the Sovereignty of the Peoples (Spanish: Movimiento al Socialismo – Instrumento Político por la Soberanía de los Pueblos; MAS or MAS-IPSP) (Note: A pun on más; Spanish for "more".) is a socialist political party in Bolivia. Its followers are known as Masistas.

In the December 2005 election, MAS-IPSP won the first majority victory ever won by a single Bolivian party since Bolivia's return to democracy, electing Evo Morales as president. The party went on to win the next four general elections by a majority, ruling until 2025, when their support collapsed during that year's election. MAS–IPSP also dominated the municipal elections during this period.

MAS-IPSP evolved out of the movement to defend the interests of coca growers and is rooted in indigenous mobilization. Morales has articulated the goals of his party and popular organizations as the need to achieve plurinational unity, and to develop a new hydrocarbon law which guarantees 50% of revenue to Bolivia, although political leaders of MAS-IPSP in later years showed interest in complete nationalization of the fossil fuel industries, as well as the country's lithium deposits.

During Arce's government, the party was divided into two internal factions: the "Arcistas" (Renovator Bloc), which defends Luis Arce's management and seeks the renovation of the party leadership, which is chaired by Grover García, and the "Evistas", which defends Morales's leadership and seeks his re-election in the 2025 Bolivian general election. On 4 October 2023, President Luis Arce and Vice President David Choquehuanca were expelled from the party by a decision of the board chaired by Evo Morales. However, the Arcista faction did not recognize the expulsion.

By February 2025, Morales left MAS due to the party prohibiting him from running for president in the 2025 general election; initially joining the Front for Victory party, he and his supporters later went on to found a new party, EVO Pueblo.

Mainly due to internal conflicts and high dissatisfaction towards the Arce government due to a crisis leading to shortage of goods, the party faced a near-total collapse of support in the 2025 general election, winning 3.1% of the vote (slightly above the minimun percentage necessary to maintain the party's national status). The presidential candidate, Eduardo del Castillo, was placed sixth in the first round. In the legislative elections, the party maintained only 2 of 75 seats in the Chamber of Deputies, while being eliminated in the Senate.

== History ==
=== Origins ===
The roots of MAS-IPSP can be traced to the closures of the Bolivian Mining Corporation and shut-down of various mines during the 1980s. Thousands of former miners became coca farmers as their means of survival, but also encountered new hardships in their new profession. The growth of the coca farmer community resulted in a sharp numerical growth of organizations such as Unified Syndical Confederation of Peasant Workers of Bolivia (CSUTCB) and Syndicalist Confederation of Intercultural Communities of Bolivia (CSCIB). The movement built alliances with the Confederation of Indigenous Peoples of Eastern Bolivia (CIDOB) and mobilized joint protests in a 1992 campaign titled "500 years of resistance of the indigenous peoples", culminating in a march to La Paz where a protest was held on 12 October 1992 (Columbus Day). The 1992 campaign marked the emergence of a 'peasant-Indigenous' movement.

However, CSUTCB was wary of building a political party to contest state power. The experiences of the 1980s, when the CSUTCB leadership had been divided over electoral candidatures (of leaders such as Genaro Flores and Víctor Hugo Cárdenas) had been negative. Rather the organization began discussing the possibility of launching a 'political instrument', a structure in which the trade unions would enter as collective members. The idea would be to combine social and political struggles, to have one branch in the social movements and one political branch. According to Lino Villca there were also discussions about forming an armed wing of the movement.

Carlos Burgoa Maya traces the initiative for a political instrument to the Third Congress of the CSUTCB (26 June–3 July 1987, Cochabamba) in which several proposals were merged into a document proposing an "Assembly of Nationalities" including traditional authorities to forge "political instruments of the nationalities." In the COB's 9th Congress (May 1992, Sucre), a thesis for worker-indigenous unity in "constructing a political instrument" was approved. Numerous prominent future leaders of the MAS, including Evo Morales, Félix Patzi, and David Choquehuanca met on 7 November 1992 in a gathering organized by CSUTCB, CSCB, CIDOB, FNMCB (Bartolina Sisa), and the COB, which decided to call for withdrawal from existing parties and to consolidate as an independent political force. The August–September 1994 cocalero march also endorsed the creation of a political instrument.

The creation of a political instrument received the backing of the sixth CSUTCB congress in 1994, and in March 1995 CSUTCB convened a congress titled 'Land, Territory and Political Instrument' in Santa Cruz de la Sierra. Present at the congress were CSUTCB, CSCB, the Bartolina Sisa National Federation of Peasant Women of Bolivia and CIDOB. The congress resulted in the foundation of the Assembly for the Sovereignty of the Peoples (ASP), under the leadership of the Cochabamba peasant leader Alejo Véliz as the main leader and Evo Morales in second position. From 1996 onwards, Evo Morales was a rising star in the ASP leadership. Soon he became a competitor of Veliz. Internal conflict emerged between the followers of Morales and Veliz — evistas and alejistas. ASP wanted to contest the 1997 national elections, but never obtained the registration of a political party at the CNE. Instead, the group contested the election of the lists of the United Left. Veliz was candidate for the presidency and for parliament (on the proportional representation list). However, many trade unions decided not to support Veliz's candidature, accusing him of having manipulated the candidate lists of the United Left. Four ASP members of the Chamber of Deputies were elected from the Chapare Province (the entire United Left group): Evo Morales, Román Loayza Caero, Félix Sanchéz Veizaga and Néstor Guzmán Villarroel.

=== Foundation and local elections ===
After the 1997 elections a split occurred in ASP and Evo Morales was expelled from the organization. In 1998 the supporters of Evo Morales founded the Political Instrument for the Sovereignty of the Peoples (IPSP). Notably, the majority of the grassroots supporters of ASP sided with Morales in the split. One of the prominent ASP leaders who sided with Morales was Román Loayza Caero, leader of CSUTCB.

At the time of its foundation, an IPSP flag was adopted. It was brown and green, with a sun in the middle.

In order to contest the 1999 municipal election (because the National Electoral Court of Bolivia declined to recognize the party), IPSP borrowed the registration (and party name) of an inactive spliter faction of the falangist Bolivian Socialist Falange, Movimiento al Socialismo – Unzaguista (MAS). The decision to go for elections as MAS was taken in Cochabamba in 1998. IPSP decided to adopt the name, banner and colours (cobalt blue, black, and white) of MAS. In January 1999, the organization adopted the name MAS-IPSP. This move provoked a split between IPSP and the new CSUTCB leader, Felipe Quispe. Quispe stated that he was unable to accept to contest the elections under a name tainted by a fascist past and that the falangist profile meant a negation of indigenous identity. In the 1999 elections Quispe aligned himself with Veliz's group, which had decided to contest elections through the Communist Party of Bolivia. In the Cochabamba region the verbal confrontations between the two sides were often tense, and the Veliz group launched the slogan "MAS is Unzaguist, falangist, heil heil Hitler". MAS-IPSP itself however stressed that the adaptation of the name MAS was a mere formality, and the membership cards issued by the organization carried the slogan "legally MAS, legitimately IPSP".

MAS-IPSP got 65,425 votes (3.3% of the nationwide votes) and won 81 local council seats (4.8% of the seats in the country) in 1999. According to a study by Xavier Albó and Victor Quispe, the vast majority of the MAS-IPSP councilors elected in the 1999 municipal election were indigenous. In the Cochabamba Department MAS-IPSP obtained 39% of the votes winning seven mayoral posts. The MAS vote in Cochabamba was almost completely confined to the Chapare, Carrasco and Ayopaya provinces. In the capital of the Department (Cochabamba) the MAS mayoral candidate only got 0.88% (less than the Communist Party candidate, Alejo Veliz who got 1.1%). The mayoral post of Cochabamba was won by Manfred Reyes Villa of the New Republican Force, who got 51.2% of the votes in the city.

=== Years of struggle ===
During the years of 1998–2002, the grassroot base of MAS-IPSP was consolidated, as a result of increasing repression against the coca growers' movement. MAS-IPSP represented, along with the smaller Pachakuti Indigenous Movement (MIP, Felipe Quispe's new party), the anti-system opposition in the country. Whilst Bolivian politics had seen several political parties contesting on populist platforms during the past decades, MAS-IPSP and MIP differed from these parties through its strong connections to the peasant organizations. However, the fact that MIP had been accorded registration as a political party by the National Electoral Court (in spite of falling short of having the 10,000 members required for registration) angered MAS-IPSP followers. Both within MAS-IPSP and amongst political analysts the smooth registration of MIP was described as a move by the political establishment to divide the indigenous vote and to spoil the chances of a possible MAS-IPSP/MIP alliance. By this time IPSP had been denied registration by the National Electoral Court four times, citing minor details.

The period of 2000–2002 was characterized by a series of social struggles that contributed to the radicalization of the Bolivian polity; the Cochabamba Water War, Aymara uprisings in 2000 and 2001 and the coca growers' struggle in Chapare. While social movements are by no means new in Bolivia, a country with a long history of revolution due to political and class struggle, this protest cycle marked a renewal of militancy and growing successful organizational planning which had not been witnessed before.

In January 2002, Morales was expelled from the parliament after being accused of masterminding violent confrontations between police and coca growers in Sacaba. The expulsion of Morales from the parliament contributed to the political popularity of MAS-IPSP.

Ahead of the 2002 national elections, MAS-IPSP sought to expand its influence outside its peasant base. Evo Morales stood as presidential candidate and Antonio Peredo as vice-presidential candidate. By launching Peredo for the vice-presidency, MAS-IPSP attempted to gain influence amongst the urban middle classes. MAS-IPSP also made an appeal for the supporters of the Marxist left groups to join the campaign and present themselves as MAS-IPSP candidates. Prominent MAS-IPSP leaders recruited for the 2002 election campaign included Gustavo Torrico, Manuel Morales Dávila and Jorge Alvaro.

In their election campaign, MAS-IPSP championed 'national sovereignty', denouncing U.S. interventions in Bolivian affairs. The political elite and proponents of neoliberal policies were denounced as 'traitors' supported by the United States. The appeal of MAS-IPSP was also aided by the intervention of US ambassador Manuel Rocha, who threatened Bolivians that US economic aid to Bolivia would be cut if Morales won. Morales has credited ambassador Rocha for the success of MAS, stating that "[e]very statement [Rocha] made against us helped us to grow and awaken the conscience of the people." Anti-US sentiment was further exacerbated when the new ambassador, David Greenlee, made it clear that he would not approve of any president other than Gonzalo Sánchez de Lozada (Goni).

The electoral advance of MAS-IPSP was aided by the implosion of the political party Conscience of Fatherland (CONDEPA). CONDEPA was a populist party which was based in the urban poor, often Aymaras who had migrated to the urban centres of Bolivia. The party had lost much of its popular legitimacy as it was coopted by Hugo Banzer's government, and the party had suffered the death of its main leader just before the 2002 elections. In the polls CONDEPA lost all of their 22 parliamentary seats.

Whilst Gonzalo Sánchez de Lozada was re-elected as President of Bolivia by Congress, Evo Morales came in second place with just 1.5% fewer votes than Sánchez de Lozada. MAS-IPSP got 14.6% of the valid uninominal vote, which gave the movement 27 out of 130 seats in the Chamber of Deputies and eight out of 27 seats in the Senate. The election result shocked both political analysts as well as MAS-IPSP itself. Out of the elected MAS-IPSP legislators, ten identified themselves as indigenous or peasants, twelve as leftwing intellectuals or labour leaders.

The fifth national congress of MAS-IPSP was held in Oruro 13–14 December 2003.

=== In government (2005–2025) ===
In the 2005 general election, Evo Morales was again the presidential candidate of MAS-IPSP. He won a clear majority with 53.7% of the valid presidential vote—the first since the restoration of democracy that a presidential candidate had won without the need for a runoff. MAS-IPSP obtained 43.5% of the valid uninominal vote, which gave it 72 out of 130 seats in the Chamber of Deputies and 12 out of 27 seats in the Senate. In the 2005 prefect elections, MAS campaigned for all nine departmental prefectures (governorships), but only won three: Chuquisaca (43%), Oruro (41.0%), and Potosí (42.7%).

Since taking office, the MAS-IPSP government has emphasized modernization of the country, promoting industrialization, increased state intervention in the economy, social and cultural inclusion, and redistribution of revenue from natural resources through various social service programs.

When the first MAS-IPSP cabinet was formed, it had Andrés Soliz Rada as Minister for Hydrocarbons, David Choquehuanca as Foreign Minister, Casimira Rodríguez as Justice Minister, Salvador Ric Reira as Minister for Public Works and Services, Hugo Salvatierra as Rural Development Minister, Álex Gálvez Mamami as Labour Minister, Abel Mamami as Water Minister, Félix Patzi as Education Minister, Félipe Caceres as Vice Minister of Social Defense, Alicia Muñoz as Minister of Government, Juan Ramón Quintana as Minister of the Presidency, Carlos Villegas as Minister of Economic Planning and Walter Villarroel as Mining Minister. Two MAS-IPSP heavyweights, Santos Ramírez and Edmundo Novillo (since elected governor of Cochabamba in April 2010 local elections), became the president of the Senate and the House of Deputies respectively.

The 2006 elections to the Constituent Assembly further consolidated the position of MAS-IPSP as the dominant force in Bolivian politics. After the elections Román Loayza Caero became the head of the MAS-IPSP faction in the Constituent Assembly.

In 2007 MAS-IPSP was able to register itself as MAS-IPSP at the CNE.

On 10 August 2008 a vote of confidence referendum was held regarding the posts of president Morales, vice-president Garcia Linera and different prefects. Morales and Garcia Linera got their mandate affirmed by a wide majority, reaching 83% of the votes in La Paz and 71% of the votes in Cochabamba in their favour. But they also obtained significant support in the 'Media Luna' departments (Santa Cruz 41%, Beni 44%, Pando 53% and Tarija 50%), indicating the consolidation of MAS-IPSP as a national political force.

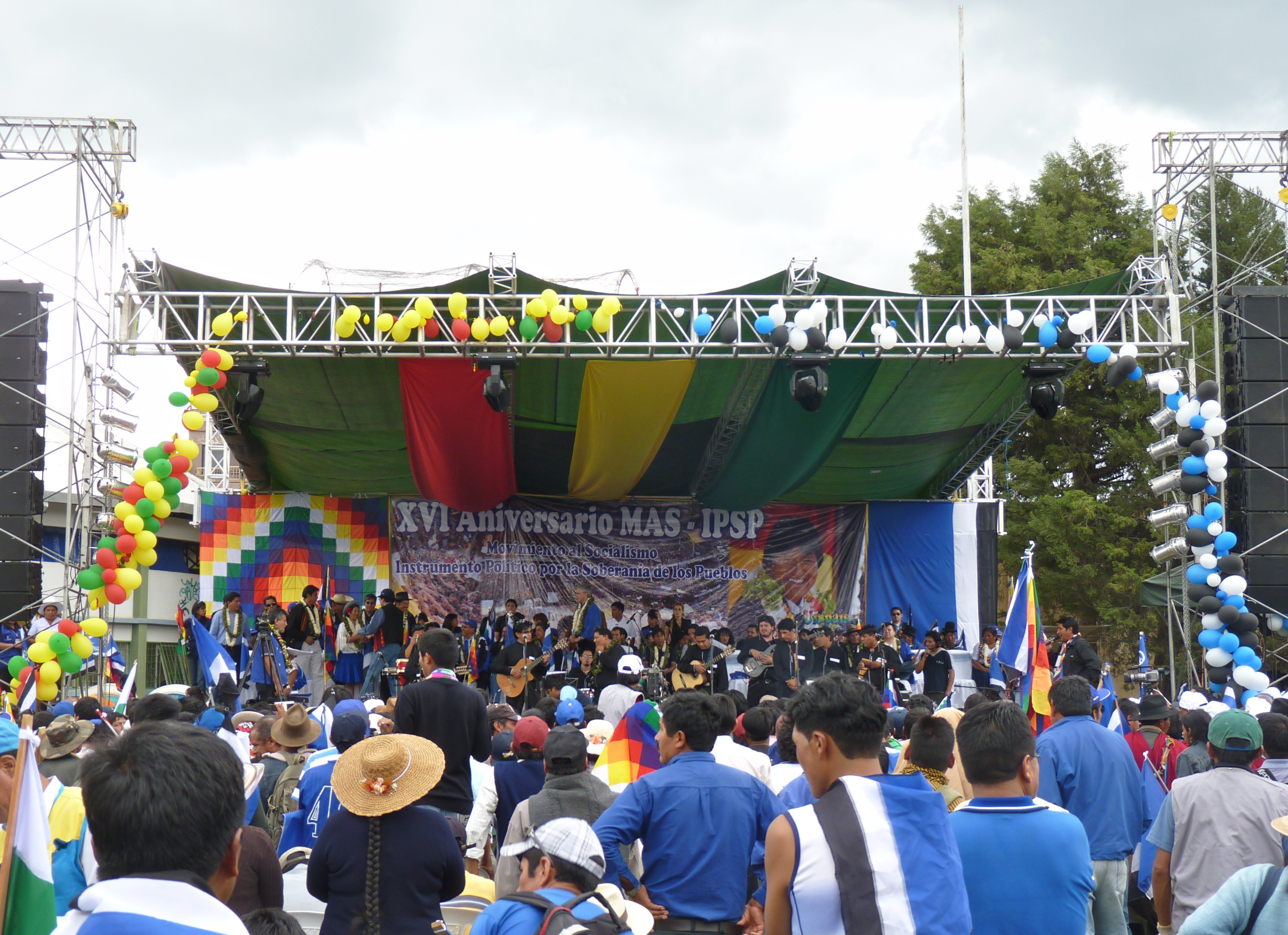
MAS-IPSP partisans celebrate the 16th anniversary of the party's founding in Sacaba, Cochabamba.

In the 2010 regional elections, MAS-IPSP won the post of governor in six departements (La Paz, Oruro, Potosí, Pando, Chuquisaca and Cochabamba) and finished second in the remaining three (Santa Cruz, Tarija and Beni). In Chuquisaca MAS-IPSP had launched 29-year-old Estaban Urquizu as its candidate for governor. Urquizu won with 53.9% of the votes, becoming the youngest governor in Bolivian history. In La Paz Department MAS-IPSP dropped its candidate Félix Patzi shortly before the elections, after Patzi was arrested for drunk driving.

The election was also marked by candidatures of MAS-IPSP dissidents. MAS-IPSP co-founder Lino Villca had founded the Movement for Sovereignty (MPS), which contested the elections. Other former MAS-IPSP activists involved in founding the MPS include Óscar Chirinos, Miguel Machaca, and Rufo Calle.

In the municipal elections in 2015, it was the only party to contest leadership of all 339 municipalities. In all, the mayors of 227 municipalities belong to the party, as do 1,144 of the country's 2,022 municipal council members.

The 2020 general election had a record voter turnout of 88.4% and ended in a landslide win for MAS which took 55.1% of the votes.

There was a deep internal divisions within the party between the supporters of president Luis Arce and former president Evo Morales. In September 2024, clashes between pro-Arce and pro-Morales factions in La Paz ended with 40 people injured. On November 26, 2024, Groover García was recognized as president of the MAS recognized by him (TSE), leaving Evo Morales out of the presidency of the MAS and without power within the MAS. In February 2025, Evo Morales presented his formal resignation from Movimiento al Socialismo (MAS). He was running for president in the August 17 elections with the Front for Victory (FPV).

In the August 2025 general election, MAS presidential candidate Eduardo del Castillo won just 3.16% of the vote, meaning the end of two decades of Movimiento al Socialismo (MAS) dominance. Arce was expelled from the party soon after the election.

== Ideology ==
Morales has defined socialism in terms of communitarianism, stating in a 2003 interview that in the "ayllu people live in community, with values such as solidarity and reciprocity". Regarding the question of national identity, MAS-IPSP borrows discourse from the katarista tradition and from the indigenous peoples' movement in eastern Bolivia, criticizing the modern nation state as a failed construct of "internal colonialism" and inherently racist. Thus the movement seeks to construct a plurinational state based on autonomies of the indigenous peoples. In the MAS-IPSP discourse "nation" and "people" are often equated, whilst the oligarchy is portrayed as anti-national.

The katarista discourse was not a feature of the ideological profile of the IPSP at the time of its foundation. IPSP surged as a movement of the peasantry, amongst colonizers and coca growers. The katarista discourse was absorbed later, largely borrowed from Felipe Quispe's rhetoric from the struggles of 2000. However, unlike Quispe, the MAS-IPSP never went as far as to create an exclusively indigenous political profile, and Morales maintained that an alliance with non-indigenous actors and the middle classes was a necessity. The seventh congress of MAS-IPSP, held in January 2009, approved a document titled "Communitarian socialism to liberate Bolivia from the colonial state", envisioning the path of a "cultural and democratic revolution" in Bolivia.

In a 2005 programme MAS set out its main and national objective:

The main and national objective of the MAS economic program is to improve the conditions and quality of life of all Bolivians. A process of changing the development pattern will begin due to the failure and negative balances left by State Capitalism and Neoliberalism. The productive, dignified and sovereign State will be built based on the current characteristics of the country: structural heterogeneity, regional asymmetry, political, economic and social exclusion, and high levels of poverty and human degradation.

A 2006 development plan called for buen vivir (Living well) as an alternative to capitalist development, stating that

The development around Living Well is based on the ability to recover the link with nature and with social memory, which in agrarian communities is centered on the land, in nomadic communities in the forest and in urban communities in the neighborhood and the city, in order to discard the deliberate procedure of separating societies from their cultural roots, through monocultural domination. Planning seeks to organize development and strengthen the principle of intrinsic relationship between Bolivian cultures and nature as a nexus that generates visions about the world; of interpretations of the work; of identities about time and its myths; construction of territoriality and power. The solid links of Bolivian cultures with nature are a heritage of all and constitute an enormous comparative advantage in relation to a capitalist development model, whose basic development equation, associated with the predation of natural resources with short-term profits, is in crisis. Our proposal for a new development, whose roots are rooted in cultural plurality, in the encounter and in the complementarity of knowledge, has the objective of putting an end to the myth of linear progress that seeks to divide cultures into “modern” and “backward”; between “primitive” and “advanced”. This developmental trap entails the annihilation of other temporalities, other memories, other contributions to the construction of interhuman relationships and other relationships with time and space. In such a way that one of the horizons of this Strategy is to contribute to the preservation of other meanings about the relationship between humanity and nature.

A later development plan from 2010 stated that:

The beginning of the 21st century is a time of great opportunities for our country. The capitalist model of accumulation and the consumption patterns of "western civilization" have entered into crisis. Against this backdrop, Bolivia emerges with a new political and philosophical proposal, the Democratic and Cultural Revolution, which is aimed at forging a just, diverse, inclusive, balanced and harmonious world with nature for the "Living Well" of all peoples worldwide. In this context, the government of President Evo Morales has brought to international forums a series of proposals to innovate diplomatic relations between States, to seek integration and trade between peoples and, above all, to promote a new type of relationship between human beings and the environment. Thus, in early 2009, he proposed to the United Nations Assembly the "10 Commandments to Save the Planet, Humanity and Life", a document that was taken as the basis for the UN to declare April 22 as "Mother Earth Day". It is undeniable, then, that our country has inscribed its leadership in the international arena. For this reason, our Government Program proposes to give continuity to the international relations policies that the Foreign Ministry has been developing and that are part of the National Development Plan.

According to Blade Nzimande in 2007, MAS-IPSP does not have an ideological centre, and the different constituent movements belong to slightly different trends of thought. He also argued that Marxists, social-democrats, and anarchists can be found within the MAS-IPSP fold. In the words of Álvaro García Linera, the political character of MAS-IPSP has evolved through the combination of "an eclectic indianism and the critical and self-critical traditions of the intellectual left-wing that began to Indianize Marxism from the 1980s and onwards". According to García Linera, a "flexible indianism" enabled MAS-IPSP to gather support from a variety of sectors. Bolivian writer and economist Roberto Laserna argues that there are three main factions within the party: the indigenistas, the old leftists, and the [left-wing] populists. García Linera once described MAS-IPSP as "centre-left", stating that the goal of the movement is the establishment of a form of "Andean capitalism" which Linera Which characterized as a stage in the transition to socialism in Bolivia. In the findings of Latinobarómetro surveys until 2002, a sample of 27 MAS voters identified themselves as 2.7 on a scale between 0 and 10 (in which 0 represented the far-left and 10 represented the far-right).

According to Marta Harnecker and Federico Fuentes, MAS-IPSP represents a "new indigenous nationalism" based on two sets of historical memories, that of the peasant movement (represented through CSUTCB) and that of the indigenous movement (represented through CIDOB), and combines elements of indigenismo, nationalism and "miners' Marxism".

According to Carlos Toranzo Roca, the politics of MAS-IPSP is largely a continuation of the traditional Latin American populism which in Bolivia is rooted in the 1952 revolution. According to him, a key element of this feature is clientelistic relations of distribution combined with anti-imperialist and nationalist discourse.

The party has also been described by a number of observers as centre-left. Towards the 2020 general elections, the party, under the influence of candidate Luis Arce, was said to have adopted centre-left strategies, abandoning the party's historical radical strategies. After Arce assumed the presidency of Bolivia, an internal division arose between the so-called "arcistas" (those who respond to the current president) who are said to constitute a more centre-left profile and the "evistas" (attached to the former president) who are said to be closer to the far-left. Some time later the Arcista faction took the party's presidency and became the main faction of the party.

A 2021 statute noted that the MAS-IPSP is governed by the following principles: Anti-imperialism, Anti-capitalism, Anti-colonialism, Complementarity, Historical memory, Pluralism, Exercise of Plurinationality, Plurinational Identity, Internal Democracy, Internal Discipline, Equality and gender equity, Depatriarchalization, Unity, Solidarity, and Respect for natural leadership.

In its program for 2025–2030, MAS-IPSP sets out its position in these terms:

The political project of social organizations, through the MAS-IPSP and the anti-systemic forces currently in the process of articulation, has a historic character and is the work of the united struggle of the Bolivian people. The electoral victory of 2005, the impetus of the Democratic Cultural Revolution, the nationalization of hydrocarbons, the recovery of natural resources and privatized companies, the Constituent Assembly, the approval via referendum of the new CPE (Central Constitution), and the creation of the Plurinational State and the achievements they include—all this and more—is the result of a long accumulation of forces, that is, the result of the struggle of indigenous peasants, the labor movement, and popular sectors that have suffered cruel massacres at the hands of dictatorships and neoliberal governments since the 1960s. Given the circumstances of the international and national context, the unity of popular, revolutionary, and democratic forces is not only necessary but urgent. This unity must be cohered into a program that, while being self-critical and reflecting what has been done well, must have a popular, democratic, and anti-fascist national character, responding to the essence and roots of the political project engendered by the people: decolonizing, anti-imperialist, anti-capitalist, and anti-patriarchal. This is the essence of its national and social liberation.

== Organization ==
IPSP was founded as a 'political instrument', an organization distinct from the traditional political parties. Hervé do Alto defines the organization as both a political party and a federation of social movements at the same time. As such, MAS-IPSP tends to follow a bottom-up, decentralized structure, with regional and local branches having a large amount of input on party decisions.

=== Leadership ===
The National Leadership (Dirección Nacional, DN) of MAS-IPSP is composed of representatives of the constituent organizations affiliated with MAS-IPSP. It is more of a loosely coordinated body rather than a party leadership in the traditional sense. Notably MAS-IPSP has not been institutionally consolidated in the way the Workers' Party (PT) in Brazil has developed, which also emerged as a political vehicle of social movements. Clause 42 of the Organic Bylaws of MAS-IPSP stipulated that candidates in national and local elections should be elected through direct vote at assemblies. The majority of the MAS-IPSP candidatures in the 1999 and 2002 elections were selected through this method. However some candidates in the 2002 and 2005 elections were directly appointed by Morales.

=== Member organizations ===
The founding member organizations of MAS-IPSP are CSUTCB, CSCB, and the Bartolina Sisa federation. At the sixth MAS-IPSP congress, held in November 2006, four new organizations were admitted as members of MAS-IPSP: Confederación Nacional de Maestros Rurales, Confederación de Gremiales de Bolivia, Confederación Nacional de Rentistas y Jubilados and Confederación Nacional de la Micro y Pequeña Empresa (Conamype).

The seventh congress of MAS-IPSP was held 10–12 January 2009. At this congress two organizations were included as new members of MAS-IPSP; the National Federation of Mining Cooperatives (Fencomin, which claims a membership of around 40,000) and the Regional Workers Centre (COR) from El Alto. The Bolivian Workers' Center (COB) and the National Council of Ayllus and Markas of Qullasuyu (CONAMAQ) are not part of MAS-IPSP, but are supportive of the government.

=== Coalition organizations ===
The MAS-IPSP ran a joint electoral slate with the Fearless Movement (MSM) in the 2009 national elections. Shortly afterward, Evo Morales publicly broke with the MSM and its representatives in the Plurinational Legislative Assembly then formed an independent bloc.

The three founding organizations of the MAS-IPSP are joined by CONAMAQ and the Confederation of Indigenous Peoples of Bolivia (CIDOB) in the Pact of Unity; this group has included other organizations in the past.

A larger alliance, the National Coordinator for Change (CONALCAM) was formed during the Bolivian Constituent Assembly and includes MAS-IPSP executive and legislative politicians as well as social movement organizations.

=== Publication ===
MAS-IPSP publishes Soberanía.

== Election results ==
=== Presidential elections ===
Election	Presidential nominee	Votes	%	Votes	%	Result
Election	Presidential nominee	First round		Second round		Result
2002	Evo Morales	581,884	20.9%	43 (Note: After no candidate won more than 50% of the vote in the 2002 Bolivian general election, the National Congress was required to elect the president in an indirect second round.)	33.86%	Lost ✗
2005	Evo Morales	1,544,374	53.7%			Elected ✓
2009	Evo Morales	2,943,209	64.2%			Elected ✓
2014	Evo Morales	3,173,304	61.4%			Elected ✓
2019	Evo Morales	2,889,359	47.1%			Annulled ✗
2020	Luis Arce	3,393,978	55.1%			Elected ✓
2025	Eduardo del Castillo	163,878	3.2%			Lost ✗

=== Chamber of Deputies and Senate elections ===
Election	Party leader	Votes	%	Chamber seats	±	Position	Senate seats	±	Position	Status
2002	Evo Morales	581,884	20.9%	27 / 130	New	▲2nd	8 / 27	New	▲2nd	Opposition
2005	Evo Morales	1,544,374	53.7%	72 / 130	▲45	▲1st	12 / 27	▲4	▲1st	Majority
2009	Evo Morales	2,943,209	64.2%	88 / 130	▲16	1st	26 / 36	▲14	1st	Supermajority
2014	Evo Morales	3,173,304	61.4%	88 / 130	Steady	1st	25 / 36	▼1	1st	Supermajority
2019	Evo Morales	2,889,359	47.1%	67 / 130	▼21	1st	21 / 36	▼4	1st	Annulled
2020	Evo Morales	3,393,978	55.1%	75 / 130	▲8	1st	21 / 36	Steady	1st	Supermajority
2025	Eduardo del Castillo	159,979	3.2%	2 / 130	▼74	▼6th	0 / 36	▼21	▼6th	Opposition
