= David Cortés (politician) =

Bolivian politician (1955–2015)

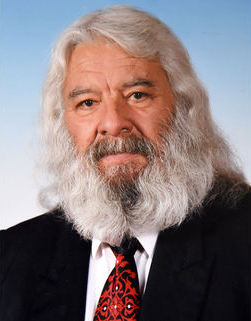
- Official portrait, 2014

Member of the Chamber of Deputies from Potosí circumscription 37
- In office 19 January 2010 – 18 January 2015
- Substitute: Elizabeth Soto (2010–2012) (Note: Expelled from office.)
- Preceded by: César Navarro
- Succeeded by: Gonzalo Barrientos (Note: Redistribution; circumscription 33.)
- Constituency: Potosí

Personal details
- Born: Ángel David Cortés Villegas; 1 March 1955 Potosí, Bolivia
- Died: 30 October 2015 (aged 60) La Paz, Bolivia
- Party: Social Alliance
- Other political affiliations: Communist
- Education: Marshal Sucre Normal School; Tomás Frías University
- Occupation: Educator; politician; trade unionist

Ángel David Cortés Villegas (1 March 1955 – 30 October 2015) was a Bolivian educator, politician, and trade unionist who served as a member of the Chamber of Deputies from Potosí, representing circumscription 37 from 2010 to 2015.

Cortés graduated as a teacher from the Marshal Sucre Normal School and obtained a master's in educational management from Tomás Frías University. His opposition to the repressive military governments of the day brought him into the ranks of the Communist Party of Bolivia, an organization with which he fought for the rights of educators and mineworkers.

Throughout his career, Cortés served as an advisor to Potosí's largest trade unions, helmed multiple teachers' unions, and directed La Palca's Óscar Alfaro School. In 2005, he was appointed to serve as Potosí's senior official for culture and human development, a position that brought him to local notability for his tradition of dressing as Santa Claus during the Christmas season. When Potosí Mayor René Joaquino sought the presidency in 2009, Cortés was nominated to run for a seat in the Chamber of Deputies, a position he attained, thanks in large part to his popularity in the city.

== Early life and career ==
David Cortés was born on 1 March 1955 in Potosí to David Cortés Rivera and Aurelia Villegas. Cortés was raised in the small mining community of Catavi, completing primary education at the Marshal Sucre School before moving to Sucre in 1968, where he graduated from secondary at the Junín National School. He pursued simultaneous degrees in medicine and education, completing six semesters of medical school and graduating from the Marshal Sucre Normal School. He subsequently attended Tomás Frías University, graduating with a degree in educational administration with a master's in educational management. While in university, Cortés enjoyed a twelve-year career in professional football, playing as a goalkeeper for River Plate and Independiente Petrolero.

In his adolescence, Cortés was a witness to the San Juan massacre, in which striking mineworkers were brutally gunned down by the Armed Forces. The military government's violent repression of workers motivated Cortés to involve himself in the labor movement. His left-wing activism against the dictatorships of the 1970s and '80s led him to join the Communist Party of Bolivia (PCB). He became one of its leaders in the public sphere, representing the education and mining sectors. In 1980, he became a founding member of the National Confederation of Student Teachers and served as its executive secretary. That year, following the coup d'état of Luis García Meza, Cortés was arrested and conscripted into the Army's 10th Division in Tupiza for three years. Barred from political activity, he briefly returned to football, playing for Potosí's 1º de Mayo club.

Following his release, Cortés returned to education. He briefly worked as a professor at the Siglo XX National University before settling in La Palca. There, he first taught at the Óscar Alfaro School and later directed it for eighteen years between 1985 and 2003. During this time, Cortés served as executive secretary of the Federation of Education Workers of Potosí in addition to working as an advisor to the Departmental Workers' Center and serving as a member of the Potosí Civic Committee. In 2003, Cortés was appointed to serve as district director of urban education of Potosí, a position he exercised for two years. Shortly thereafter, Potosí Mayor René Joaquino invited Cortés to work in the Mayor's Office as the municipal government's senior official for culture and human development. Cortés held the position for four years between 2005 and 2009. During this time, he became well known in the city for his tradition of dressing as Santa Claus during the Christmas season, sharing merriment, and distributing gifts to children, for which he was dubbed the "Santa Claus of Potosí".

== Chamber of Deputies ==
=== Election ===
Cortés's popularity in the city led him to be put forward as a candidate for a seat in the Chamber of Deputies on behalf of Joaquino's Social Alliance (AS). In the 2009 general election, the AS nominated him to run in circumscription 37, encompassing the municipality of Potosí. Cortés's popularity, coupled with Joaquino's established political presence in the area, landed him the victory in the election.

=== Tenure ===
While in the Chamber of Deputies, Cortés served as a leading member of the Parliamentary Network for Children and Adolescents, a legislative body committed to the rights and welfare of the country's youth. In that vein, he continued his longstanding tradition of celebrating Christmas as Santa Claus. Throughout all five years of his term, Cortés served as the fourth secretary on the lower chamber's directorate, during which time he presented a total of twelve bills for consideration, of which four went on to be enacted into law. Around halfway through his term, Cortés distanced himself from the AS and aligned himself with the ruling Movement for Socialism, regularly voting in favor of the party's political projects from then on.

Upon the conclusion of his tenure, Cortés did not seek reelection and retired from politics. He died in La Paz in October 2015, less than a year after leaving office. Following a brief memorial at the Legislative Assembly, his remains were interred in La Paz's Jardín Cemetery.

=== Commission assignments ===
- Chamber of Deputies Directorate (Fourth Secretary: 2010–2015)

== Electoral history ==
Electoral history of David Cortés
Year	Office	Party	Votes			Result	Ref.
Year	Office	Party	Total	%	P.	Result	Ref.
2009	Deputy	Social Alliance	21,121	48.23%	1st	Won	
Source: Plurinational Electoral Organ | Electoral Atlas

Chamber of Deputies of Bolivia
Preceded by César Navarro	Member of the Chamber of Deputies from Potosí circumscription 37; 2010–2015	Succeeded by Gonzalo Barrientos
Preceded by Roxana Sandoval	Fourth Secretary of the Chamber of Deputies; 2010–2015	Succeeded by Ginna Torrez
