= Assembly for the Sovereignty of the Peoples =

Political party in Bolivia

The Assembly for the Sovereignty of the Peoples (Spanish: Asamblea por la Soberanía de los Pueblos, ASP) was a political organization in Bolivia. It was formed as a "political instrument" of the popular movements of the country. Alejo Véliz was the national president of ASP.

== History ==
ASP was founded at a congress in Santa Cruz de la Sierra in 1995 titled 'Land, Territory and Political Instrument'. Present at the congress were CSUTCB, CSCB, the Bartolina Sisa National Federation of Peasant Women of Bolivia and CIDOB. The congress had been convened by CSUTCB following a decision at its congress in 1994. The Cochabamba peasant leader Alejo Véliz became the main leader of ASP with Evo Morales in second position.

=== Internal conflict ===
From 1996 onwards, Evo Morales began to rise as a prominent leader inside ASP. Soon he became a competitor of Veliz. Internal conflict emerged between the followers of Morales and Veliz, evistas and alejistas, surged. ASP wanted to contest the 1997 national elections, but never obtained the registration of a political party at the National Electoral Court. Instead the group contested the election of the lists of the United Left. Veliz was a candidate for presidency and for parliament (on the proportional representation list). However, many trade unions decided not to support Veliz's candidature, accusing him of having manipulated the candidate lists of the United Left. Four ASP members of the Chamber of Deputies were elected from the Chapare province (the entire United Left group); Evo Morales, Román Loayza Caero, Félix Sanchéz Veizaga and Néstor Guzmán Villarroel.

After the 1997 elections a split occurred in ASP, and Evo Morales was expelled from the organization. In 1998 the supporters of Evo Morales founded the Political Instrument for the Sovereignty of the Peoples (IPSP). Notably, the majority of the grassroots supporters of ASP sided with Morales in the split. One of the prominent ASP leaders who sided with Morales was Román Loayza Caero, leader of CSUTCB.

== 1999 elections ==
Ahead of the 1999 municipal elections, ASP had still not obtained any registration. Contested the elections on the lists of the Communist Party of Bolivia (PCB). In Cochabamba Alejo Veliz ran for the post of mayor and received 1.1% of the votes in the city.

== 2002 elections ==
Ahead of the 2002 general elections, a sector of ASP led by Hugo Moldiz denounced Veliz and declared their support for the candidacy of Evo Morales.
