= Claudia Fernández Valdivia =

Former second lady of Bolivia

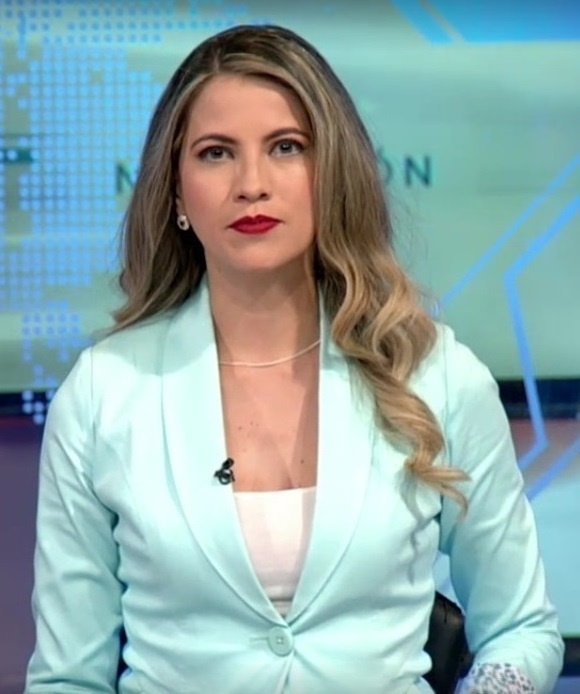

Second Lady of Bolivia
- In role 8 September 2012 – 10 November 2019
- Vice President: Álvaro García Linera
- Preceded by: Elvira Salinas de Mesa (2003)
- Succeeded by: Lidia Gutiérrez

Personal details
- Born: 30 January 1988 (age 38) La Paz, Bolivia
- Spouse: Álvaro García Linera (m. 2012)
- Children: 1
- Education: Loyola University
- Occupation: Commercial engineer, TV presenter

Claudia Fernández Valdivia (born 30 January 1988) is a Bolivian commercial engineer and television presenter. Since September 2012, she has been married to Álvaro García Linera, who was Bolivia's vice president from 2006 to 2019.

== Early years and education ==
Claudia Fernández Valdivia was born in La Paz on 30 January 1988, the daughter of Óscar Fernández (from Chuquisaca) and Gloria Valdivia (from Santa Cruz). Both emigrated to the city for work reasons and stayed to start a family. During her childhood and adolescence she lived in La Paz, completing baccalaureate studies at the Loreto y Humboldt school in 2005. She graduated from Loyola University with a degree in commercial engineering.

== TV career ==
=== Disca y Ve ===
In 2003, Fernández successfully auditioned to become a presenter for the Red ATB music program Disca y Ve. This proved to be a valuable experience for her, working alongside Javier Encinas on a prominent national program.

=== Uno Teens ===
She moved to Red Uno in 2004, as the host of the children's program Uno Teens, a rival of Unitel's Chicostation in the same time slot. "Getting through these three years is an achievement," said Fernández, age 19, in a 4 March 2007 edition of El Diario's supplement Tu Guía.

On 5 June 2009, she said goodbye to her audience and left Uno Teens to work on the network's journalistic programs.

=== Notivisión ===
After years of appearances on Red Uno's various news shows in La Paz, Fernández became the host of the network's main news program, Notivisión, alongside journalist César Galindo. She cited María Duchén and Miriam Claros as role models.

She decided to leave Red Uno on 25 December 2017, an announcement she made on the central edition of Notivisión, to devote herself to the care of her young daughter and spend more time with her family.

In an interview on the program El Mañanero on 26 December, Fernández declared: "They have been 14 years of friendships, shared with so many people. It's difficult" She justified her decision by mentioning her firstborn as the main reason for her retirement: "She is starting to walk and I want to be with her." She also mentioned that while she was retired from television, she would keep in touch with people and interact with the public through social networks, and that she would return.

After more than a year away from the media, Fernández returned to Red Uno on 7 January 2019. She resumed hosting the central edition of Notivisión in La Paz.

== Radio career ==
In 2015, Claudia Fernández made her first foray into radio broadcasting, temporarily sharing the microphone with journalist Mario Espinoza on Radio Compañera 106.3 FM in La Paz, replacing her colleague Juan Carlos Monrroy on the program De 9 a 12.

== Other work ==
In 2009, Fernández was part of Pablo Manzoni's modeling troupe Las Magníficas at the Bolivia Moda fashion event at government headquarters.

== Personal life ==
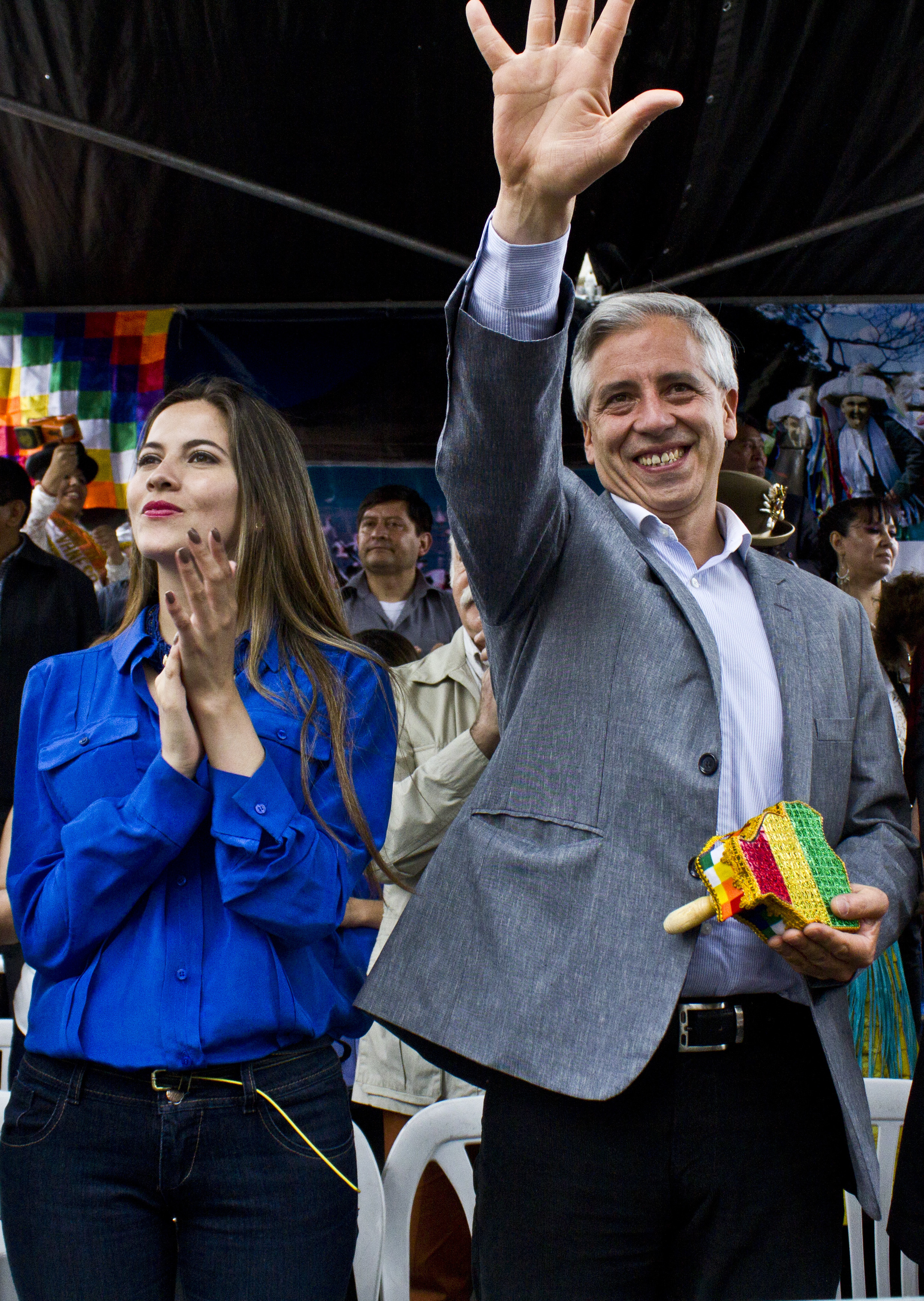
Claudia Fernández and Álvaro García Linera in Buenos Aires in October 2014

In 2011, Fernández began a romantic relationship with the Vice President of Bolivia, Álvaro García Linera, while covering Palacio Quemado as a journalist for Red Uno. On 9 June 2011, on the PAT program Del Cielo al Infierno, García Linera admitted to having a relationship with a commercial engineer, without clearly saying who it was. In a subsequent interview for the magazine Oxígeno, Fernandez said that she once dated García Linera, without going into more detail.

In February 2012, the couple announced that they were engaged. On 8 September 2012, 24-year-old Fernández married 49-year-old García Linera in a ceremony which was broadcast nationally and internationally. The wedding was held with an Aymara rite in the Kalasasaya temple at the archaeological site of Tiwanaku. Among those attending the event were Nobel Peace Prize winners Rigoberta Menchú and Adolfo Pérez Esquivel, as well as government officials, ambassadors, Aymara native authorities, representatives of social organizations, show business personalities, and dozens of other guests. One of the first gifts the bride and groom received came from President Evo Morales, who hung a pink baby carrier on Garcia Linera's neck. According to Morales, this represented good wishes for García Linera's dream of "having a daughter" to come true. The next day, on 9 September, the couple married before the civil notary, and later under Catholic rite in the Basilica of San Francisco, La Paz.

On 17 April 2017, their first daughter was born at the CEMES clinic in La Paz.

Claudia Fernández is a supporter of the football club The Strongest, and a fan of Portuguese footballer Cristiano Ronaldo and actor Ashton Kutcher. Professionally, she admires Patricia Janiot and Claudia Palacios of CNN en Español.

Honorary titles
Vacant Title last held by Elvira Salinas de Mesa	Second Lady of Bolivia; 2012–2019	Vacant Title next held by Lidia Gutiérrez
