= 2009 Bolivian general election =

- 6 December 2009
- Presidential election
- Registered: 5,139,554
- Turnout: 94.54% (▲10.05pp)
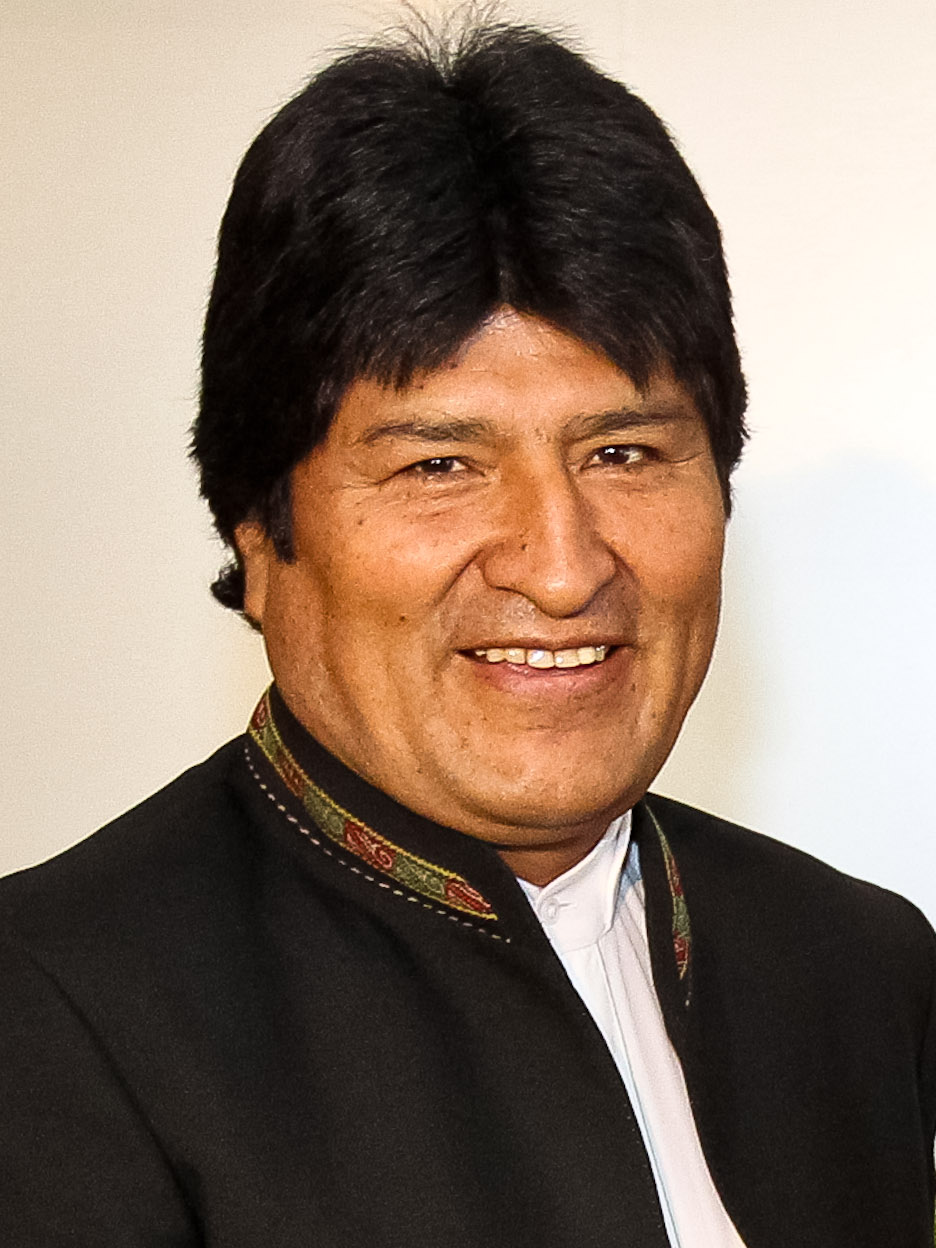

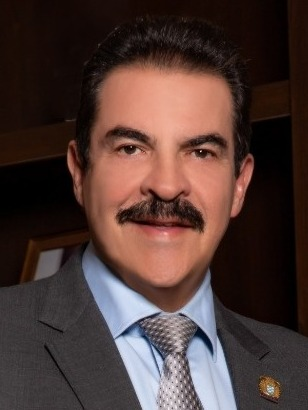

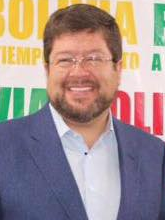
Nominee	Evo Morales	Manfred Reyes Villa	Samuel Doria Medina
Party	MAS-IPSP	PPB-CN	UN
Running mate	Álvaro García Linera	Leopoldo Fernández	Gabriel Helbing
Popular vote	2,943,209	1,212,795	258,971
Percentage	64.22%	24.46%	5.65%
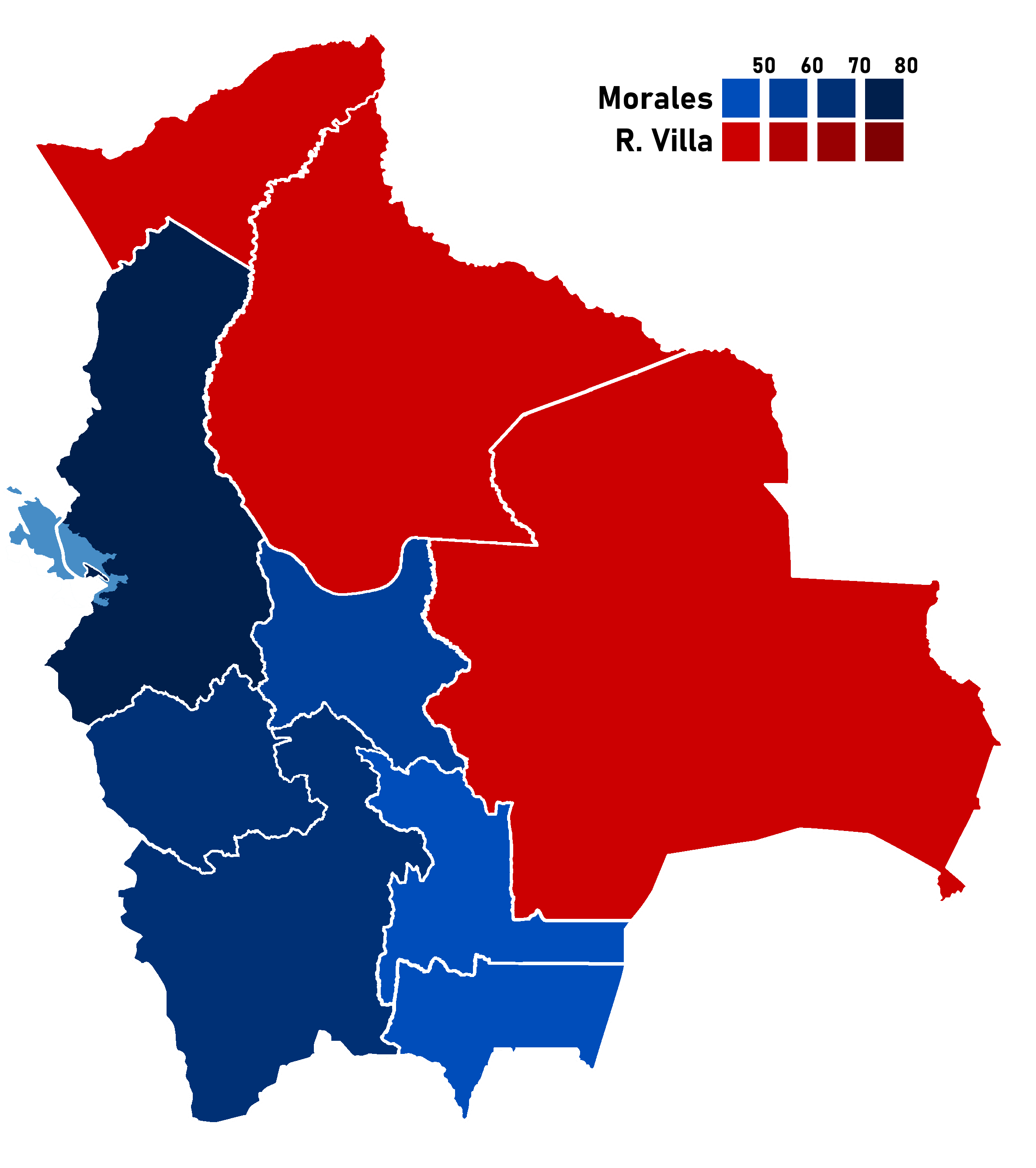
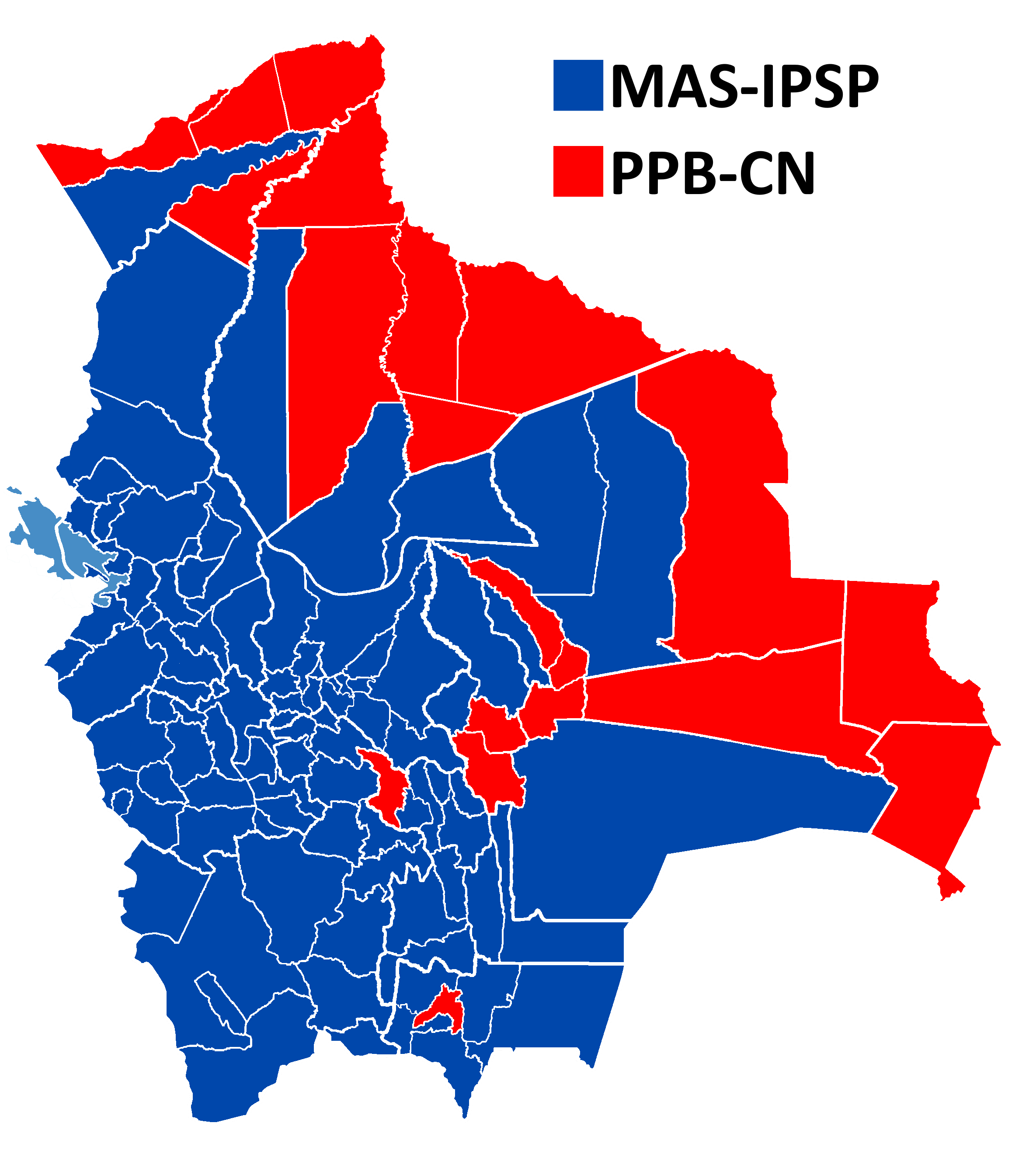
President before election
Evo Morales
MAS-IPSP
Elected President
Evo Morales
MAS-IPSP
- Legislative election
- All 36 seats in the Chamber of Senators; All 130 seats in the Chamber of Deputies
Party	Seats	+/–
Chamber of Senators
MAS-IPSP	26	+14
PPB-CN	10	New
Chamber of Deputies
MAS-IPSP	88	+16
PPB-CN	37	New
UN	3	−5
Social Alliance	2	New
This lists parties that won seats. See the complete results below.

General elections were held in Bolivia on December 6, 2009, following a constitutional referendum held on 25 January 2009. The election was initially expected to be held in 2010. Voters elected:

- President and Vice President of the State.
- 130 members of the Chamber of Deputies.
- 36 members of the Senate.

The five departments which had not already done so all voted to have departmental autonomy. Eleven municipalities voted to have indigenous autonomy, out of twelve holding such referendums. One province voted to have regional autonomy.

== Presidential candidates ==
Under the new constitution, all previous terms will not be considered for term limits. If any candidate fails to win over 50% of the vote and another candidate is within 10%, a second round will be held. It was the first time that an incumbent president ran for reelection. The presidential candidates were:

- Evo Morales (Movement for Socialism): incumbent president, the first of indigenous identity. He is Aymara.
- Manfred Reyes Villa (Plan Progress for Bolivia – National Convergence): former prefect of the Cochabamba Department.
- René Joaquino (Social Alliance): Mayor of Potosí
- Samuel Doria Medina (Frente de Unidad Nacional)
- Alejo Véliz (Pueblos por la Libertad y Soberanía)
- Ana María Flores (Movimiento de Unidad Social Patriótica)
- Rime Choquehuanca (Bolivia Social Demócrata)
- Román Loayza (Gente)

== Opinion polls ==
Polling prior to the election indicated that incumbent Evo Morales enjoyed a 55% approval rating, as well as an 18-point lead over his closest challenger Manfred Reyes Villa. As Morales was expected to cruise to reelection, the local press reported that Villa has already purchased an airplane ticket to the United States for the 7th (the day after the election).

== Results ==
Incumbent President Evo Morales won a convincing victory, with 64% of the vote. His party, Movement for Socialism, won a two-thirds majority in both the Chamber of Deputies and the Senate.

=== President ===
Candidate	Running mate	Party	Votes	%
Evo Morales	Álvaro García Linera	Movement for Socialism	2,943,209	64.22
Manfred Reyes Villa	Leopoldo Fernández	Plan Progress for Bolivia – National Convergence	1,212,795	26.46
Samuel Doria Medina	Gabriel Helbing	National Unity Front	258,971	5.65
René Joaquino Carlos	Carlos Suárez Gonzales	Social Alliance	106,027	2.31
Ana María Flores	Guillermo Núñez	Social Patriotic Unity Movement	23,257	0.51
Román Loayza	Porfirio Mamani	Gente	15,627	0.34
Alejo Véliz	Pablo Valdez	Peoples for Liberty and Sovereignty	12,995	0.28
Rime Choquehuanca	Nora Castro	Social Democratic Bolivia	9,905	0.22
Total			4,582,786	100.00
Valid votes			4,582,786	94.31
Invalid votes			120,364	2.48
Blank votes			156,290	3.22
Total votes			4,859,440	100.00
Registered voters/turnout			5,139,554	94.55
Source: CNE

=== Chamber of Deputies ===
Party	Proportional			Constituency			Indigenous			Total seats	+/–
Party	Votes	%	Seats	Votes	%	Seats	Votes	%	Seats	Total seats	+/–
Movement for Socialism	2,851,996	63.91	33	2,050,547	57.30	49	25,095	77.53	6	88	+16
Plan Progress for Bolivia – National Convergence	1,190,603	26.68	17	962,648	26.90	19	4,902	15.14	1	37	+30
National Unity Front	255,299	5.72	3	260,994	7.29	0	1,049	3.24	0	3	–5
Social Alliance	104,952	2.35	0	140,262	3.92	2	421	1.30	0	2	New
Social Patriotic Unity Movement	21,829	0.49	0	63,007	1.76	0	268	0.83	0	0	New
Gente	15,388	0.34	0	33,159	0.93	0	184	0.57	0	0	New
Peoples for Liberty and Sovereignty	12,635	0.28	0	37,697	1.05	0	190	0.59	0	0	New
Social Democratic Bolivia	9,709	0.22	0	30,054	0.84	0	260	0.80	0	0	New
Total	4,462,411	100.00	53	3,578,368	100.00	70	32,369	100.00	7	130	0
Valid votes	4,462,411	94.26		3,578,368	76.50		32,369	71.82			
Invalid/blank votes	271,928	5.74		1,099,502	23.50		12,700	28.18			
Total votes	4,734,339	100.00		4,677,870	100.00		45,069	100.00			
Registered voters/turnout	4,970,458	95.25		4,948,823	94.52		90,952	49.55			
Source: CNE, Election Passport, Psephos

=== Chamber of Senators ===
Party	Votes	%	Seats	+/–
Movement for Socialism	2,851,996	63.91	26	+14
Plan Progress for Bolivia – National Convergence	1,190,603	26.68	10	+9
National Unity Front	255,299	5.72	0	–1
Social Alliance	104,952	2.35	0	New
Social Patriotic Unity Movement	21,829	0.49	0	New
Gente	15,388	0.34	0	New
Peoples for Liberty and Sovereignty	12,635	0.28	0	New
Social Democratic Bolivia	9,709	0.22	0	New
Total	4,462,411	100.00	36	+9
Valid votes	4,462,411	94.26		
Invalid votes	116,839	2.47		
Blank votes	155,089	3.28		
Total votes	4,734,339	100.00		
Registered voters/turnout	4,970,458	95.25		
Source: CNE

== Autonomy referendums ==
=== Departments ===
The five departments which had not already done so all voted to become autonomous departments. Each will have to produce a statute of autonomy. They were:

- Chuquisaca Department—79% voting yes
- Cochabamba Department—76.8% voting yes
- La Paz Department—79.6% voting yes
- Oruro Department—73.1% voting yes
- Potosí Department—73.9% voting yes

=== Regional autonomy ===
The Gran Chaco Province in Tarija held a referendum on regional autonomy, which was approved by 80.4% of voters.

=== Municipalities ===
The following municipalities voted on whether to become autonomous municipalities according to the Indigenous Originary Campesino Autonomy provisions of the 2009 Constitution. Eleven voted yes:

- Huacaya Municipality (Chuquisaca Department) – 53.7% of voters in favor of autonomy
- Tarabuco Municipality (Chuquisaca Department) – 90.8%
- Mojocoya Municipality (Chuquisaca Department) – 88.3%
- Charazani Municipality (La Paz Department) – 86.6%
- Jesús de Machaca Municipality (La Paz Department) – 56.1%
- Pampa Aullagas Municipality (Oruro Department) – 83.7%
- San Pedro de Totora Municipality (Oruro Department) -- 74.5%
- Chipaya Municipality (Oruro Department) -- 91.9%
- Salinas de Garci Mendoza Municipality (Oruro Department) -- 75.1%
- Chayanta Municipality (Potosí Department) – 60%
- Charagua Municipality (Santa Cruz Department) – 55.7%

One municipality voted no:

- Curahuara de Carangas Municipality
