= Ana María Flores =

Bolivian engineer, businesswoman, ex-senator

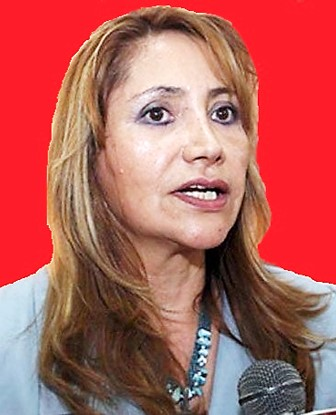
- Flores in 2009

Senator of Bolivia
- In office 6 August 2002 – 23 January 2006
- President: Gonzalo Sánchez de Lozada; Carlos Mesa; Eduardo Rodríguez
- Constituency: La Paz Department

Personal details
- Born: Ana María Flores Sanzetenea; 29 July 1952 (age 73) Sucre, Bolivia
- Party: Revolutionary Nationalist Movement; United Social Patriotic Movement; New Republican Force
- Children: Wendy Calvert, Helga Ibis
- Occupation: Businesswoman, engineer, politician

Ana María Flores Sanzetenea (born 29 July 1952) is a Bolivian engineer, businesswoman, ex-senator, and politician. She is also known for her candidacy for the presidency of Bolivia in the 2009 general election, in which she finished fifth.

== Biography ==
Ana María Flores was born on 29 July 1952 in the city of Sucre, Bolivia. Her primary and secondary schooling took place in her hometown. She continued her higher education, traveling to the United States to study civil engineering at Trinity College. She also married a U.S. citizen. A few years after their marriage, Flores was widowed with two daughters.

During her working life, Flores devoted herself entirely to the business of the mining equipment and construction company Whenhell, of which she was general manager and owner from age 27, from 1979 to 1984. She was also a representative of the companies Renardet Ingenieurs from 1984 to 1992, Santi Consulting from 1990 to 1997, and Iberinsa from 1992 to 1998. Flores was also owner of the investment group Cristal from 1995 until its end in 2002.

== Political life ==
At age 50, Flores was invited by Manfred Reyes Villa's New Republican Force to participate in the elections, where she won the position of senator for La Paz Department in the Plurinational Legislative Assembly. However she left the party after the gas conflict in 2003, during the second government of president Gonzalo Sánchez de Lozada (2002–2003).

During this time, Flores joined the "Transversal Group", a number of senators who had resigned from their respective political parties after the gas conflict. Flores contributed by denouncing several instances of nepotism in the Bolivian congress. She held her senatorial position until 2005.

Four years after leaving office, at age 57, Flores ran for president in the 2009 general election with the United Social Patriotic Movement. She finished fifth with 23,257 votes (0.51% of the general vote).

=== Kidnapping ===
In 2012, at age 60, Flores was kidnapped by a gang in the city of Santa Cruz de la Sierra. According to some Bolivian media, she paid a ransom for her release (she never disclosed the amount of money), thus regaining her freedom. The report of her abduction would become national news.

In March 2015, at age 63, Flores returned to Bolivian politics, but this time participating in regional elections for the position of mayor of the city of La Paz for the Revolutionary Nationalist Movement. She lost in subnational elections held on 29 March.

== See also ==
- Evo Morales
- Manfred Reyes Villa
- Samuel Jorge Doria Medina Auza
- René Joaquino
- Alejo Véliz
- Rime Choquehuanca
