= David Cortés =

David Cortés may refer to:

- David Cortés (politician) (1955–2015), Bolivian politician
- David Cortés (baseball) (born 1973), Mexican baseball player
- David Bonilla Cortés (born 1974), Puerto Rican politician
- David Cortés (Spanish footballer) (born 1979), Spanish footballer
- David Cortés (Colombian footballer) (born 1992), Colombian footballer
