= Túpac Katari Revolutionary Movement =

- Founded: May 1978
- Ideology: Indigenismo
- National affiliation: Revolutionary Nationalist Movement – Alliance (1979)

The Túpac Katari Revolutionary Movement (Túpac Katari Revolutionary Movement) (Spanish: Movimiento Revolucionario Túpac Katari, MRTK) is a left-wing political party in Bolivia.

The Túpac Katari Revolutionary Movement was founded in May 1978 and was constituted as a left-wing national democratic organization for all classes, based mainly on the peasantry and other exploited strata, with the object of establishing a just society, majority rule and self-determination of the people. Led by Juan Condori Uruchi, Clemente Ramos Flores, Daniel Calle M.

The party claims origins in independence movements started under Spanish rule in 1781 (by Túpac Katari in Bolivia and Túpac Amaru II in Peru) and continued as peasant movements in 1946–1952, leading to land reform, universal suffrage and the nationalization of mines between 1952 and 1964, and to the creation of a Túpac Katari Confederation in 1971.

In 1978 the Túpac Katari Revolutionary Movement took part in an electoral coalition Democratic and Popular Union backing Hernán Siles Zuazo.

After the 1978 elections, the MRTK broke with the Democratic and Popular Union and personal rivalries divided it into three factions.

For the 1979 general elections, the fraction that retained the name MRTK, led by Macabeo Chila Prieto, was the component of the Revolutionary Nationalist Movement-Alliance, with the MNR's Víctor Paz Estenssoro as the coalition's presidential candidate. The second fraction was led by Clemente Ramos Flores and joined the Democratic and Popular Union backing Hernán Siles Zuazo. The third and largest was led by Jenaro Flores Santos, who declined to compete and "instructed the party's adherents to vote for the left".

In 1980 the MRTK allied with the Revolutionary Party of the Nationalist Left and its candidate Juan Lechín Oquendo.

The Macabeo Chila Prieto's MRTK took part in 1985 elections, running its leader. He polled 1.08 per cent of the vote.

After the 1985 elections, the Macabeo Chila Prieto's MRTK disappeared.

In 1985 Jenaro Flores Santos registered the Revolutionary Liberation Movement Túpac Katari (Movimiento Revolucionario Túpac Katari de Liberacion, MRTKL). It took part in 1985 elections, running Jenaro Flores Santos. He polled 2.11 per cent of the vote.

Within a year of its formation, divisions emerged within the MRTKL between Jenaro Flores Santos, on the one hand, and Víctor Hugo Cárdenas and Walter Reynaga Vásquez, the party's two deputies of the National Congress, on the other. In a 1988 party congress, Jenaro Flores Santos walked out with some of his supporters and formed the Katarist United Liberation Front (FULKA). Both parties lost support after the internal bickering became public. Jenaro Flores Santos's exit still did not achieve unity in the MRTKL: neither Víctor Hugo Cárdenas nor Walter Reynaga Vásquez would accept the second position in the new party hierarchy. Víctor Hugo Cárdenas eventually edged out his rival.

The MRTKL took part in 1989 elections, running Víctor Hugo Cárdenas. He polled 1.6 per cent of the vote. Although the indigenous candidates attracted large crowds, they found that many campesinos already were committed to the Revolutionary Nationalist Movement, the Revolutionary Left Movement, or other parties that had a better chance of winning.
