= 1999 Bolivian municipal elections =

Municipal elections were held in Bolivia, on December 5, 1999, in all 311 municipalities across the country. The elections marked a milestone in the continuous deterioration of the political influence of the traditional parties. In 23 municipalities the mayors were elected through direct popular vote, in other municipalities the mayors were elected by the respective municipal council.

== Contesting parties ==
Eighteen political parties contested the elections.

=== MIR ===
The Revolutionary Left Movement (MIR) was able to make a minor comeback in these elections, increasing its share of votes to 16% compared to around 9% in the 1993 and 1995 municipal polls. The party emerged as the largest party in 56 municipalities. It achieved its best results in the La Paz and Tarija Departments, winning 24.09% and 24.45% of the votes in respective Department. The weakest region of MIR was the Cochabamba Department, where the party scored 6.92% of the votes.

=== ADN ===
The Nationalist Democratic Action (ADN), the party of then president and former military dictator Hugo Banzer, came third in the polls. It was however able to get 70 mayors elected from its ranks. Notably in municipalities were the mayors were elected by the municipal councils, ADN was able to obtain a high percentage of mayors elected. The foremost stronghold of the party was Pando Department, where the party got 49% of the votes and was able to gain 14 out of 15 mayoral posts.

=== The Left ===
This was the first election contested by Evo Morales' Movement for Socialism (MAS). MAS emerged from the split in the Assembly for the Sovereignty of the Peoples, which had been divided in a factional conflict between Morales and Alejo Veliz. Morales' group obtained the legal registry to compete in the elections by borrowing the registration (and party name) of a falangist splinter faction (MAS-U). Veliz's group decided to contest on the lists of the Communist Party of Bolivia (PCB). Felipe Quispe aligned himself with Veliz's group. In the Cochabamba region the verbal confrontations between the two sides were often tense, the Veliz group launched the slogan "MAS is Unzaguist, falangist, heil heil Hitler".

=== UCS ===
The national vote of the Civic Solidarity Union (UCS) went down from 17.45% nationwide in 1995 to 11.8% in 1999. However, the party was able to consolidate its position in the mayoral election in Santa Cruz de la Sierra, where its candidate Johnny Férnandez was re-elected.

=== CONDEPA ===
At the time of the 1999 elections the Conscience of the Fatherland (CONDEPA) was a party in crisis. The party had suffered the death of its leader Carlos Palenque, and divisions had erupted amongst his successors. Moreover, the influence of the mass media connected to the party had decreased significantly. As the party lost the municipal contest in El Alto in these elections, they lost their last remaining political stronghold in the country.

== Candidates ==
According to a study of Xavier Albó and Víctor Quispe (which included a survey of 1628 local politicians, roughly corresponding to the final election tally), 76% of the surveyed politicians were members of the political party which had nominated them as candidates. The highest number was found in the Nationalist Revolutionary Movement (MNR), 85%, whilst the lowest figure was recorded amongst the candidates of the Without Fear Movement (MSM), 36%.

The Albó/Quispe study also surveyed the ethnic identification of the councilors. The survey included four degrees of (indigenous) as well as a 'non-indigenous' category. 22.4% of surveyed councilors were identified as 'highly' indigenous, 20.6% as 'medium', 19.0% 'discoursive' indigenous, 11.0% as 'discretely' indigenous and 27.0% as 'non-indigenous'. Two parties, the Communist Party of Bolivia (PCB) and the Movement for Socialism (MAS) had the markedly highest number of indigenous (in the two first degree categories), 75.60% for the Communist Party and 75.0% for MAS. Amongst the Communist Party councilors, 62.50% were identified as 'highly' ethnic (the highest number amongst all contesting parties). The percentage of non-indigenous PCB/MAS candidates was only 1.3%. The high number of indigenous councilors of the Communist Party can be explained through the alliance the party had done with Alejo Veliz's group.

The highest percentage of non-indigenous councilors was found in the three mayor parties (MNR, ADN, MIR), which all had a percentage of non-indigenous candidates slightly exceeding 30%.

== Results ==
Party	Votes	%	Seats
Revolutionary Nationalist Movement	408,824	20.42	463
Revolutionary Left Movement	319,399	15.96	319
Nationalist Democratic Action	292,803	14.63	355
Solidarity Civic Unity	237,094	11.84	155
New Republican Force	166,173	8.30	94
Without Fear Movement	116,652	5.83	48
Free Bolivia Movement	89,505	4.47	84
Conscience of Fatherland	80,857	4.04	34
Movement for Socialism	65,425	3.27	80
Socialist Party-1	55,823	2.79	12
VR-9	43,713	2.18	12
Bolivian Socialist Falange	43,364	2.17	3
Revolutionary Left Front	37,833	1.89	17
Communist Party of Bolivia	22,502	1.12	22
Democratic National Katarism	8,216	0.41	0
Christian Democratic Party	7,538	0.38	0
Popular Patriotic Movement	4,607	0.23	0
Revolutionary Liberation Movement Tupaq Katari	1,473	0.07	2
Total	2,001,801	100.00	1,700
Valid votes	2,001,801	94.22	
Invalid/blank votes	122,708	5.78	
Total votes	2,124,509	100.00	
Registered voters/turnout	3,573,851	59.45	
Source: Romero

The elections produced a fragmented verdict in most municipalities. In line with the pattern in the national political scene at the time, building coalitions was often necessary in order to form a municipal government. In terms of percentage of votes, the 'big three' (MNR, ADN, MIR) stood at 51%, a reduction from 59% in the 1987 municipal elections. The share of votes mustered by smaller parties increased compared to the 1995 election, parties with less than 3% of the national votes shared 11.27% of the votes (compared to 6.0% in 1995). A government study of 269 municipalities showed that in 73% of the studied municipalities no single party held absolute majority in the municipal council (slightly down from 75% in the preceding 1995 municipal elections). The fragmentation was highest in the La Paz Department (with 20% of municipal councils with a single party holding absolute majority), whilst in the Pando Department 93% of the municipalities had single-party absolute majorities.

The two parties sharing the national government at the time of the election (ADN and MIR) obtained a combined vote of 38.1%. If one adds their political allies UCS and NFR the vote of the governing bloc exceeded 54% (although NFR was not fully submerged into the ruling alliance). However, national alliances did not play a role in the municipal elections, as the different parties of the governing bloc competed against each other on the local level.

Notably, the three largest parties (MNR, ADN, MIR) got a relatively high number of seats in comparison with their percentage of votes, due to the fact that they obtained many seats in sparsely populated areas in eastern Bolivia (thanks to their wide national organizational coverage). Together they mustered two thirds of the seats in the country. Newer parties like NFR and MSM got a relatively lower number of seats, as their vote was concentrated in urban areas.

As a result of the Quota Law (adopted in 1997) and Law on Political Parties (passed on June 25, 1999), the representation of women in municipal councils increased. 42.11% of the elected councilors were women (an increase compared to 9.77% in the 1995 elections).

However, Albó/Quispe study showed that the 92% of the elected mayors were men. The study also showed that many elected mayors had contested municipal elections before. Regarding ethnicity, the study showed a correlation between the size and wealth of the municipality and the ethnic identity of its mayor. The larger the population and/or the higher the level of wealth of the municipality, the more likely it was that the mayor would be non-indigenous.

=== La Paz Department ===
In La Paz, the media attention of the election campaign came to focus on the Juan del Granado's discourse against corruption and in favour of participatory democracy. In the end del Granado, a known human rights lawyer and parliamentarian, won the election by a very thin margin. In neighbouring El Alto, reducing commuting times between La Paz and El Alto remained high on the agenda, as in previous local elections. The incumbent CONDEPA had launched Remedios Loza, a popular TV figure, as their candidate. However CONDEPA was weakened in the city not only by the impact of the loss of its national leader, but also suffered from impopularity due to corruption and mismanagement in the municipality. The party was routed by the MIR, as the MIR leader José Luis Paredes was elected mayor with 45% of the votes. The electoral intervention of MNR in the city was quite low-key, in spite of the party having a strong local organization. Rather than seeking to get their candidate elected as mayor, the party focused on promoting their leader Goni ahead of the 2002 presidential election. MNR obtained a single seat in the El Alto municipal council.

=== Cochabamba Department ===
Evo Morales' new platform MAS obtained 39% of the votes in the Cochabamba Department, winning seven mayoral posts. The MAS vote in Cochabamba was almost completely confined to the Chapare, Carrasco and Ayopaya provinces. In the capital of the Department (Cochabamba) the MAS mayoral candidate only got 0.88% (less than the Communist Party candidate, Alejo Veliz who got 1.1%). The mayoral post of Cochabamba was won by Manfred Reyes Villa of the New Republican Force, who got 51.2% of the votes in the city.

=== Santa Cruz Department ===
The regional capital Santa Cruz de la Sierra witnessed a fierce electoral battle between the incumbent UCS mayor Johnny Férnandez and Percy Férnandez of MNR, out of which the UCS candidate emerged victorious.

In Charagua ADN, MNR, MIR, MBL and NFR won one seat each.

=== Beni Department ===
In Moxos Province, ADN won three seats and MNR two.
