= EGTK =

EGTK may refer to:

- Oxford Airport, England, ICAO airport code EGTK
- Túpac Katari Guerrilla Army (Ejército Guerrillero Tupac Katari), a guerrilla movement in Bolivia
