= United Left (Bolivia) =

Political Coalition in Bolivia

IU election poster

The United Left (Spanish: Izquierda Unida, abbreviated IU) was a political coalition in Bolivia. IU was launched ahead of the 1989 national elections, as a successor of the United People's Front (FPU). At the time of its founding IU consisted of eight parties, including the Revolutionary Left Movement - Free Bolivia (MIR-BL), the Communist Party of Bolivia (PCB), the Socialist Party-1 (PS-1), the Axis of Patriotic Convergence (ECP), the Movement for Socialist-Unzaguist (MAS-U) and FOM.

The candidate of IU for president in 1989 was the MIR-BL leader Antonio Aranibar. The vice presidential candidate of the coalition was Walter Delgadillo, ex-general secretary of the Central Obrera Boliviana trade union confederation. The Aranibar-Delgadillo ticket obtained 113,509 votes (7.2% of the national vote). IU won ten seats in the Chamber of Deputies but no seats in the Senate. Three IU parliamentarians were elected from Cochabamba Department, Chuquisaca Department and Potosí Department, and one parliamentarian was elected from La Paz Department.

The coalition fell apart ahead of the municipal elections in December 1989, in which the different parties contested separately. IU was later revived, without MIR-BL in its fold.

By 1997 IU was largely moribund. The Jenaro Flores Santos of Katarist United Liberation Front was its vice presidential candidate. However, ahead of the 1997 national elections candidates from the Assembly for the Sovereignty of the Peoples (ASP) of Alejo Véliz and Evo Morales were included on the lists of IU. ASP had unsuccessfully sought registration as a political party prior to the alliance with IU. Véliz was the presidential candidate for IU as well as being a candidate for parliament (on the proportional representation list). Four ASP members were elected to the Chamber of Deputies as IU candidates (all from the Chapare province of Cochabamba Department); Evo Morales, Román Loayza Caero, Félix Sanchéz Veizaga and Néstor Guzmán Villarroel.
