= Gregoria Apaza =

Indigenous Bolivian leader (1751–1782)

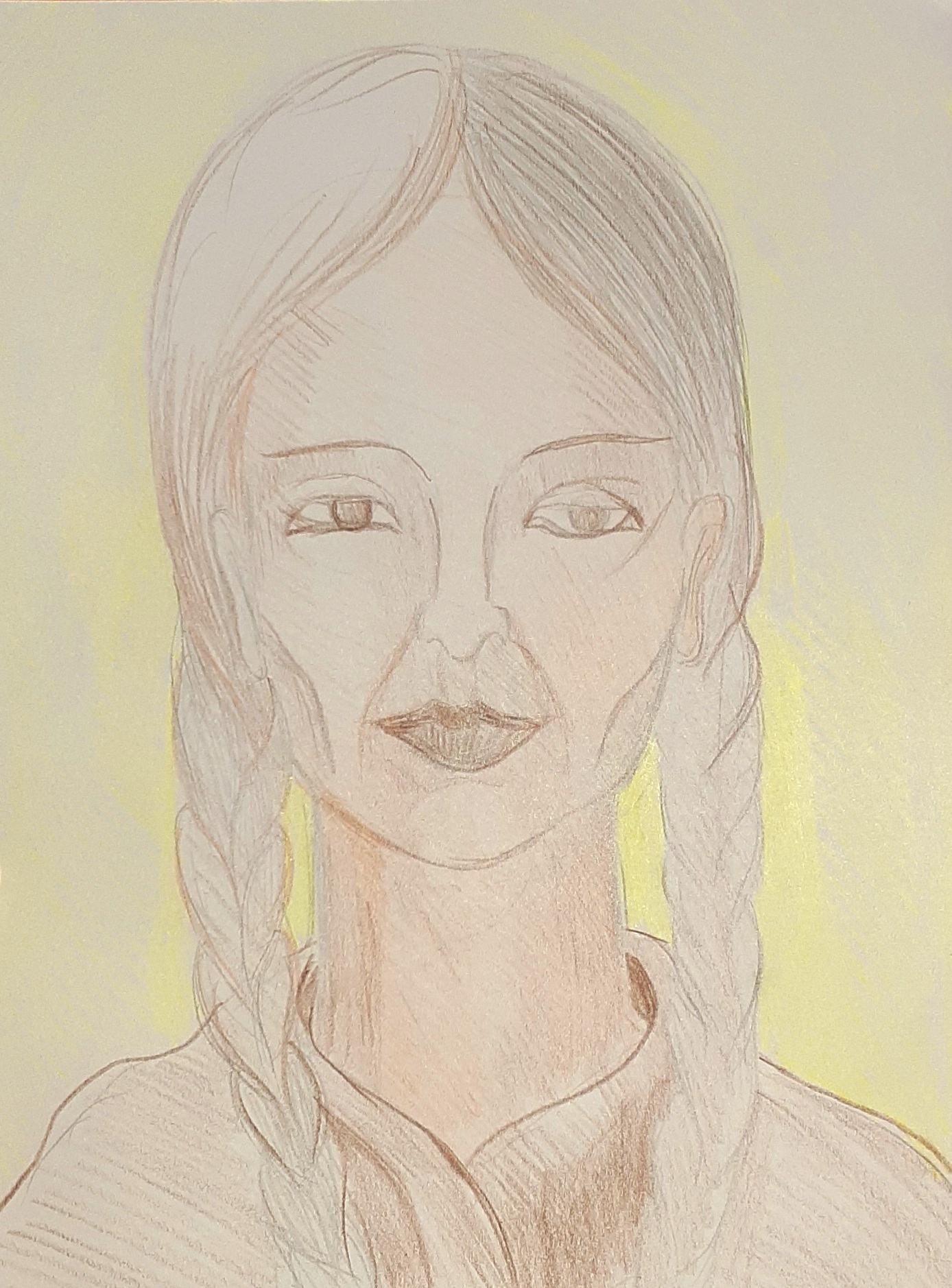
Apaza

Gregoria Apaza (June 23, 1751– September 5, 1782) was an Indigenous leader in Bolivia. In 1781, she participated with her brother Julian Apaza (Tupac Katari) and sister-in-law Bartolina Sisa in a major Indigenous revolt against Spanish colonial rule in Bolivia. These Aymara leaders laid siege to the cities of La Paz and Sorata before being defeated and executed in 1782.
