= Román Loayza =

Bolivian politician (born 1948)

Román Loayza Caero (born February 29, 1948, in Independencia) is a Bolivian politician and farmer. He was a prominent leader in the farmers' trade union movement and one of the founders of the Movement for Socialism (MAS).

Loyaza Caero grew up in Independencia and went to school for a few years there. He began working at an early age. He did his military service at the 8th cavalry regiment Mariscal Braun in Santa Cruz.

In 1978 he became the treasurer of a consumers’ cooperative in Independencia. Between 1983 and 1985 he was the general secretary of the Independencia Provincial Trade Union Centre. He then moved on to serve as Secretario de Vialidad of the Sindicato Unico de Trabajadores Campesinos de Cochabamba (SUTCCBA) between 1985 and 1987, then becoming the Organizing Secretary of SUTCCBA between 1987 and 1989 and International Secretary between 1989 and 1991. In 1993 he was elected executive secretary of the Federación Unica de Trabajadores Campesinos de Cochabamba (FUTCCBA), and re-elected in 1995. In 1995 he also took part in founding the Assembly for the Sovereignty of the Peoples. In 1996 he became the executive secretary of Confederación Sindical Única de Trabajadores Campesinos de Bolivia (CSUTCB).

In 1997 he was elected to the Chamber of Deputies, as the United Left (IU) candidate in the single-member constituency No. 31 (which covers areas of the Ayopaya, Arque, Quillacollo, Tapacari and Bolivar provinces). In 1999 Loyaza Caero took the side of Evo Morales in the factional conflict within the ASP, and joined Morales’ MAS. In 2002 he was elected substitute senator as a MAS candidate and in 2006 he was elected to the Constituent Assembly, again as a MAS candidate. Loyaza Caero led the MAS faction in the Constituent Assembly.

He would lead CSUTCB until 2005.

Loayza Caero was a candidate in the 2009 presidential election, on behalf of the grouping ‘Gente’. However, shortly before the election he withdrew from the race and broke with Gente after having received low percentages in pre-poll opinion surveys. Loayza Caero attributed the difficulties of his campaign to lack of financial resources. Later, he withdrew his withdrawal and returned to Gente. CSUTCB publicly denounced his candidature. In January 2010 he announced an alliance with PPB-CN ahead of the 2010 local and regional elections.
