= Túpac Katari Revolutionary Liberation Movement =

- Founded: 1985
- Ideology: Katarism
- Political position: Left-wing

The Túpac Katari Revolutionary Liberation Movement (Spanish: Movimiento Revolucionario Túpac Katari de Liberación, MRTKL) is a left-wing political party in Bolivia.

In 1985, Jenaro Flores Santos split from the Túpac Katari Revolutionary Movement and founded the Túpac Katari Revolutionary Liberation Movement. It took part in 1985 elections, running Jenaro Flores Santos. He polled 2.11 per cent of the vote.

Within a year of its formation, divisions emerged within the MRTKL between Jenaro Flores Santos, on the one hand, and Víctor Hugo Cárdenas and Walter Reynaga Vásquez, the party's two deputies of the National Congress, on the other. In a 1988 party congress, Jenaro Flores Santos walked out with some of his supporters and formed the Katarist United Liberation Front (FULKA). Both parties lost support after the internal bickering became public. Jenaro Flores Santos's exit still did not achieve unity in the MRTKL: neither Cárdenas nor Reynaga Vásquez would accept the second position in the new party hierarchy. Cárdenas eventually edged out his rival.

The MRTKL took part in 1989 elections, running Víctor Hugo Cárdenas. He polled 1.6 per cent of the vote. Although the indigenous candidates attracted large crowds, they found that many campesinos already were committed to the Revolutionary Nationalist Movement, the Revolutionary Left Movement, or other parties that had a better chance of winning.
