= Genaro Flores =

Bolivian politician and trade unionist (1942–2019)

Personal details
- Born: Genaro Flores Santos; 19 September 1943 Antipampa, La Paz, Bolivia
- Died: 25 August 2019 (aged 75) La Paz, Bolivia
- Party: Katarist United Liberation Front (1988–1989)
- Other political affiliations: Túpac Katari Revolutionary Movement (1978–1985); Túpac Katari Revolutionary Liberation Movement (1985–1989)
- Education: Higher University of San Andrés
- Occupation: Politician; trade unionist

Genaro Flores Santos (Note: In this Spanish name, the first or paternal surname is Flores and the second or maternal family name is Santos. Flores's given name Genaro is often rendered as Jenaro.) (19 September 1942 – 25 August 2019) was a Bolivian politician and trade unionist.

== Biography ==
Flores Santos was the founder of the Confederación Sindical Única de Trabajadores Campesinos de Bolivia, or CSUTCB. He also played a prominent role in formulating katarismo as a distinct trend in the social and political struggles in Bolivia.

Flores Santos was born in Antipampa, Collana Municipality, Aroma Province, La Paz Department, and did his military service in the Waldo Ballivián Regiment in 1965. During his military service he witnessed the suppression of the popular militias (created after the 1952 revolution), an event that impacted his political orientation. Later he began studies at the Faculty of Law at the Universidad Mayor de San Andrés. There he founded, along with other students from his home province, the Julián Apaza University Movement (MUJA). From 1968, Flores Santos emerged as the leader of the La Paz-based Aymara nucleus of peasant activists that sought to challenge the Military-Peasant Pact.

In January 1969, Flores Santos became the local head of the trade union in Antipampa, and two months later he became the union head for the Aroma province. In June 1969 he became the executive secretary of the La Paz Department Farmer-Labourers Federation (FDTCLP). In connection with his arrival to the FDTCLP leadership, the name "Túpaj Katari" was added the name of the organization.

In 1970 Flores Santos took part in agrarian struggles in the La Paz Department, with land seizures. These moves were later legalized through an agrarian reform the same year. In August 1971, at its sixth congress (organized by the government), Flores Santos was elected executive secretary of the National Farmer-Labourer Confederation of Bolivia (Confederación Nacional de Trabajadores Campesinos de Bolivia, CNTCB).

In 1971 Flores Santos was forced into exile to Chile. He returned the next year to organize underground resistance against the military government.

In 1978 he was one of the founders of the Tupaj Katari Revolutionary Movement (MRTK).

On June 26, 1979, the CSTUCB was founded with Flores Santos as its founding executive secretary. In November 1979 he led struggles against a new military coup, organizing blockades of highways across the country. During the military government of García Meza, he served as the clandestine executive secretary of the Central Obrera Boliviana (COB). The coup of García Meza had caught the COB leadership by surprise, and only Flores Santos, who had left a COB leadership meeting to make a telephone call, had escaped arrest. This was the first time a peasant leader was in charge of COB. His tenure as COB leader ended after being shot by a military patrol on June 18, 1981, after which he was paralyzed.

In the 1980s, the katarista movement was divided into two political parties. Flores Santos became the leader of one of them, FULKA.

He died August 25, 2019, aged 76.
