= María René Duchén =

Bolivian journalist, TV presenter, and politician

María Duchén
- Born: María Rene Duchén Cuéllar; 2 August 1965 (age 61); La Paz, Bolivia
- Education: Universidad Católica Boliviana
- Occupations: Journalist, TV presenter, politician
- Years active: 1990–present
- Political party: Social Democratic Power

María Rene Duchén Cuéllar (born 2 August 1965) is a Bolivian journalist, TV presenter, and politician.

== Biography ==
María Duchén was born in La Paz on 2 August 1965. Her father was from Potosí, her paternal grandmother was from Cochabamba, and her mother's family was from Santa Cruz. She studied at the American Institute in La Paz, traveling to the United States to earn a bachelor's degree. She studied chemical engineering and parallel social communication at the Universidad Católica Boliviana. She has degrees in communication rights, microfinance, microeconomics and competition from Harvard University's graduate program. She is the director of Duchén & Asociados and chairs the Nueva Esperanza Foundation.

She became known on television in 1990 as a news anchor for Red ATB. She also worked at Coca-Cola for a short time. She entered politics in 2005 when she was the vice-presidential candidate for the political group Social Democratic Power (PODEMOS), accompanying Jorge Quiroga in that year's general election and finishing in second place nationally with 28.59% of the votes.

After her political experience, Duchén returned to working in media. In 2009, she left Red PAT, continuing her journalistic work on Laser 98 radio in La Paz. Later she would serve as the host of Cadena A's central news, in addition to the weekly program Nuestras vidas. She also hosted the program Todo a pulmón.

In October 2016, she returned to Red ATB to present ATB Noticias and the analysis and interview program Anoticiando. She also hosted a morning program on ATB Radio.

Her work in the media has been recognized with the 2017 Maya Bolivia career award, the 2018 Luis Espinal Camps award granted by the Plurinational Legislative Assembly of Bolivia, and the 2019 Titicaca journalistic career award.
