= Álvaro García Linera =

38th vice president of Bolivia (2006–2019)

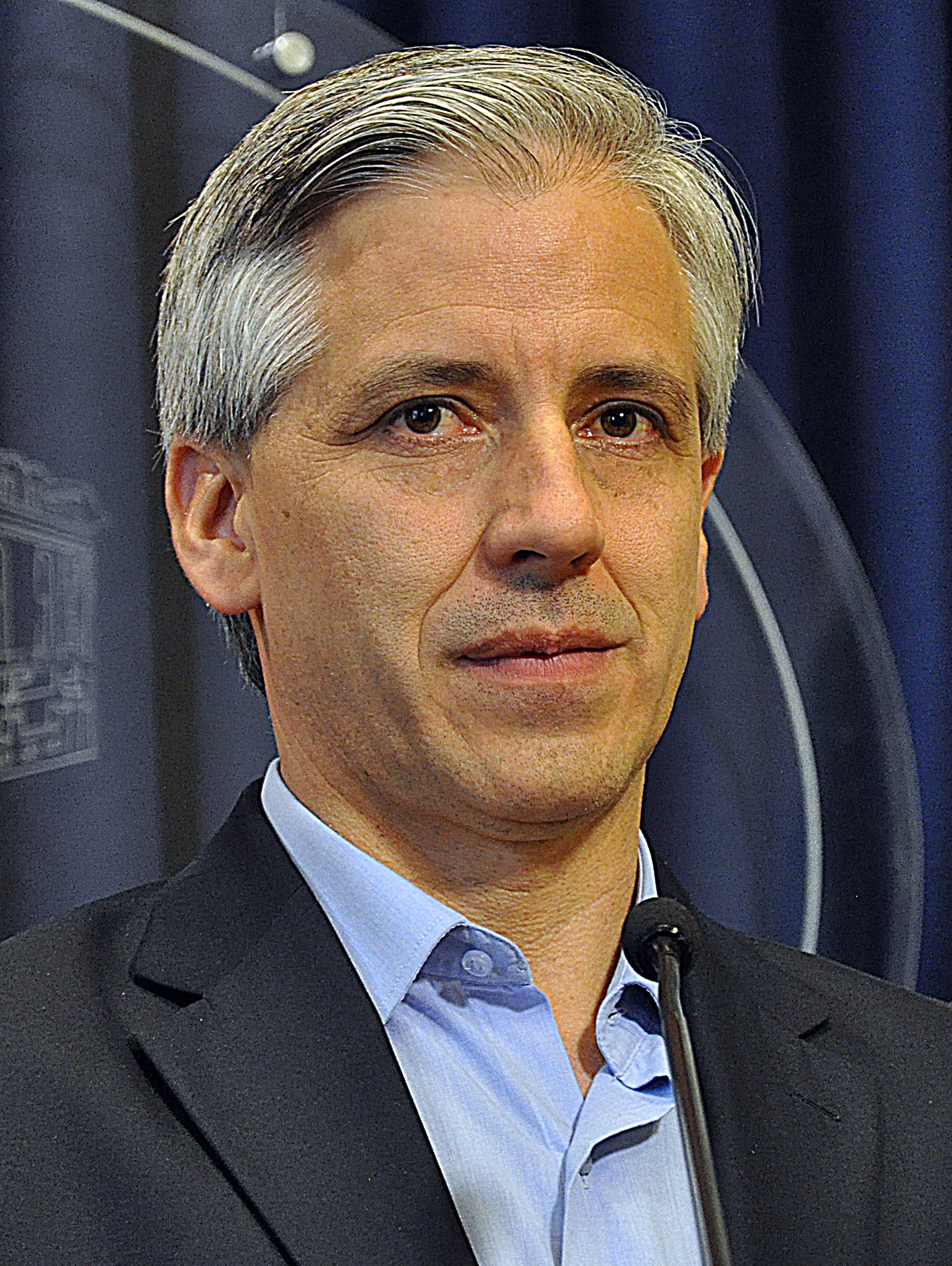

38th Vice President of Bolivia
- In office 22 January 2006 – 10 November 2019
- President: Evo Morales
- Preceded by: Carlos Mesa (2003)
- Succeeded by: David Choquehuanca (2020)

Personal details
- Born: 19 October 1962 (age 63) Cochabamba, Bolivia
- Party: Movement for Socialism
- Spouses: Raquel Gutiérrez Aguilar (m. 1984; div. 1999) Claudia Fernández Valdivia (m. 2012)
- Children: 1
- Parent(s): Raúl García Suárez; Mary Linera Pareja

Álvaro Marcelo García Linera (Spanish: [ˈalβaɾo ɣaɾˈsi.a liˈneɾa]; born 19 October 1962) is a Bolivian politician, sociologist, Marxist theoretician, and former guerrilla who served as the 38th vice president of Bolivia from 2006 to 2019. A member of the Movement for Socialism, in the early 1990s he was a leader of the Túpac Katari Guerrilla Army.

== Political career ==
In the early 1990s, García Linera was the leader of the Túpac Katari Guerrilla Army. In 1992, he was accused of armed uprising and arrested along with several other insurgents. He was released in 1997.

García was elected vice president as the running mate of Evo Morales in the 2005 presidential elections. He is an advocate of nationalization of Bolivia's hydrocarbon industry. In 2005 interview, he said that hydrocarbons "would be the second unifying factor of this society in October, 2003" and that "the debates over hydrocarbons are playing with the destiny of Bolivia." García wrote a monograph about the different political and social organizations that were a part of the political rise of the MAS and other indigenous factions, Sociología de los Movimientos Sociales en Bolivia (Sociology of Social Movements in Bolivia), which was published in 2005. Morales and Linera were both re-elected in the 2009 presidential elections.

In December 2010, Linera posted the cables mentioning Bolivia from the website WikiLeaks, which leaks information from classified sources and whistleblowers, on his official page. Linera said linking this negative information was intended to allow people to see “barbarities and insults” in Washington and to expose their "interventionist infiltration." García Linera has defended the Law of the Rights of Mother Earth, saying that it is not intended as a means to hamper industrial development or mineral extraction. Private miners have disagreed with this stance, suggesting that the law allows the government to expropriate their operations without providing compensation and that it signals Bolivia is hostile to foreign investment.

García Linera had indicated his intention of leaving politics for teaching and writing in 2014, at the end of his term. However, he chose to run for re-election and was re-elected to a third term in 2014.

Linera ran as Morales' vice-president for a fourth time in October 2019. However, on 10 November 2019 he resigned with President Evo Morales following the 2019 Bolivian protests. He left Bolivia and travelled to Mexico together with Morales.

In November 2020, he returned to Bolivia after the socialists returned to power and Luis Arce was sworn in as new President of Bolivia.

== Controversy ==
In 2016, it was publicly denounced that Linera falsified his university degree and passed himself off as a Licenciado (a degree similar to B.A. in the American system). In 2018, it was asked to the Prosecutor office to investigate Linera for this fact. It was eventually shown that he only completed about half of his degree in mathematics at the National Autonomous University of Mexico.

== Personal life ==
On 8 March 2012, García Linera publicly confirmed his engagement to Claudia Fernández Valdivia, a news anchor with Bolivian television station Red Uno. They were married in September 2012, holding an indigenous ceremony on Saturday the 8th and a Catholic one on Sunday the 9th.

== Selected list of written works ==
- with Íñigo Errejón. Qué horizonte. Hegemonía, Estado y revolución democrática. 2020
- The State and the Democratic Road to Socialism, 2018.
- Plebeian Power: Collective Action and Indigenous, Working-Class and Popular Identities in Bolivia. 2014
- Sociología de los movimientos sociales en Bolivia, La Paz, Diakonia, Oxfam y Plural, 2004.
- Procesos de trabajo y subjetividad en la formación de la nueva condición obrera en Bolivia, La Paz, Programa de las Naciones Unidas para el Desarrollo (pnud), 2000. Reproletarización.
- "Espacio Social y estructuras simbolicas. Clase, dominación simbólica y etnicidad en la obra de Pierre Bourdieu." 2000
- Nueva clase obrera y desarrollo del capital industrial en Bolivia (1952-1998), La Paz, Comuna y Muela del Diablo, 1999.
- Las armas de la utopía, La Paz, Postgrado en Ciencias del Desarrollo (ci des), umsa, Umbrales y Punto Cero, 1996.
- Forma valor y forma comunidad de los procesos de trabajo, La Paz, Quipus, 1995.
- De demonios escondidos y momentos de revolución. Marx y la revolución social en las extremidades del cuerpo capitalista, La Paz, Ofensiva Roja, 1991.
- Crítica de la nación y la nación crítica, La Paz, Ofensiva Roja, 1989.
- Introducción al Cuaderno Kovalevsky de Karl Marx, La Paz, Ofensiva Roja, 1989.
- Introducción a los estudios etnológicos de Karl Marx, La Paz, Ofensiva Roja, 1988.

Party political offices
Preceded by Antonio Peredo Leigue	Movimiento al Socialismo nominee for Vice President of Bolivia; 2005, 2014, 2019	Succeeded by David Choquehuanca
Political offices
Vacant Title last held by Carlos Mesa	Vice President of Bolivia; 2006–2019	Vacant Title next held by David Choquehuanca
Preceded by Sandro Giordano as President of the Senate	President of the National Congress; 2006–2010	Succeeded by Himself
Preceded by Himself	President of the Plurinational; Legislative Assembly; 2010–2019	Succeeded by Jeanine Áñez as President of the Senate
