= Universidad Loyola de Bolivia =

Education organization in La Paz, Bolivia

Universidad Loyola de Bolivia (Loyola University) is in La Paz, Bolivia. Founded in 1995, in 2019 the university celebrated 25 years in existence.

The school offers several degree programs including in engineering and has a sports program. It has about 2,000 students.
