= Katarist United Liberation Front =

Katarist United Liberation Front Frente Unido de Liberación Katarista
- Leader: Jenaro Flores Santos
- Ideology: Katarism

The Katarist United Liberation Front (Spanish: Frente Únido de Liberación Katarista, abbreviated FULKA) was a Katarist political party in Bolivia. The party was launched by Jenaro Flores Santos ahead of the 1989 elections. FULKA was formed after a split in the Tupaq Katari Revolutionary Movement (MRTK) at the 1988 congress of MRTK. MRTK, later renamed MRTKL, and FULKA developed an antagonistic relationship, and the bickering between the two parties hurt the public confidence in both.

Flores Santos was the presidential candidate of the party and their candidate for vice president was Hermógenes Bazualdo García. The Flores-Bazualdo ticket obtained 16,416 votes (1.16% of the national vote).

FULKA leader Flores Santos was the vice presidential candidate of the United Left (IU) in the 1993 presidential election.
