= René Joaquino =

Bolivian politician (born 1966)

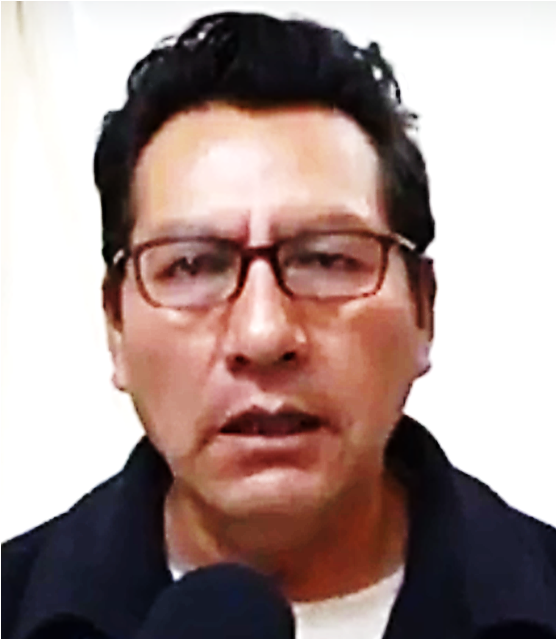

René Joaquino Cabrera is a Bolivian politician and the founder the Social Alliance political party. Joaquino was born on February 27, 1966, in the community of Asientos, part of Chicoca Chica ayllu and within the canton of Tomave, Antonio Quijarro Province, Potosí Department. He was twice elected mayor of the city of Potosí, in 2004 and 2010, but was suspended from that office on August 18, 2010. He resumed his duties on February 7, 2013. Joaquino was the city's first indigenous mayor. In the run up to the 2014 national elections, Joaquino reconciled with the Movement Towards Socialism (MAS) party and became their candidate for Potosí's first seat in the Senate of the Plurinational Legislative Assembly. He was elected to that office on October 12, 2014, and will serve as Senator from 2015 to 2020.

Joaquino's suspension as mayor was legally required due to his indictment for the municipality's illegal purchase of used vehicles in 2006. His conviction on these charges was reversed by Bolivia's Supreme Court of Justice on December 12, 2012, but he continued to face two additional criminal investigations. Joaquino was finally acquitted in the matter in December 2013.

Joaquino held the Movement Towards Socialism, which has governed at the national level since 2006, responsible for his prosecution, blaming it in 2010 for "harsh and impious" acts against him. In 2014, however, he reached an accord with the MAS to serve as its first candidate for Senator from Potosí. Per the legal requirement, Joaquino stepped down from his post as mayor to be a candidate for senator. On October 12, the MAS won 69.49% of the vote in Potosí, entitling it to three of the department's four senators. Joaquino was sworn into office on January 18, 2015, and will serve through 2021.
