= Social Alliance =

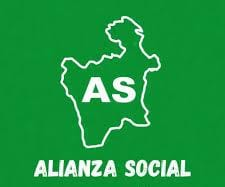
- President: René Joaquino
- Founded: 9 October 2005
- Ideology: Socialism; Indigenismo
- Political position: Left-wing

The Social Alliance is a Bolivian political party founded on 9 October 2005. It was granted juridical personhood by the National Electoral Court on 22 December 2006. The party grew out of the successful 2004 campaign of leader René Joaquino Cabrera for mayor of Potosí.

René Joaquino was the party's candidate in the 2009 presidential election, in which he placed fourth with 2.31% of the vote. The party elected two deputies to the Chamber of Deputies of the Plurinational Legislative Assembly: Ángel David Cortés Villegas from Constituency 37 in Potosí department and Wilman Ramon Cardozo Surriabre from Constituency 48 in Tarija department. In the 2010 regional election, the party contested in 22 municipalities, winning the Mayor's office in just one, Potosí (again, René Joaquino).
