= Víctor Hugo Cárdenas =

Vice president of Bolivia from 1993 to 1997

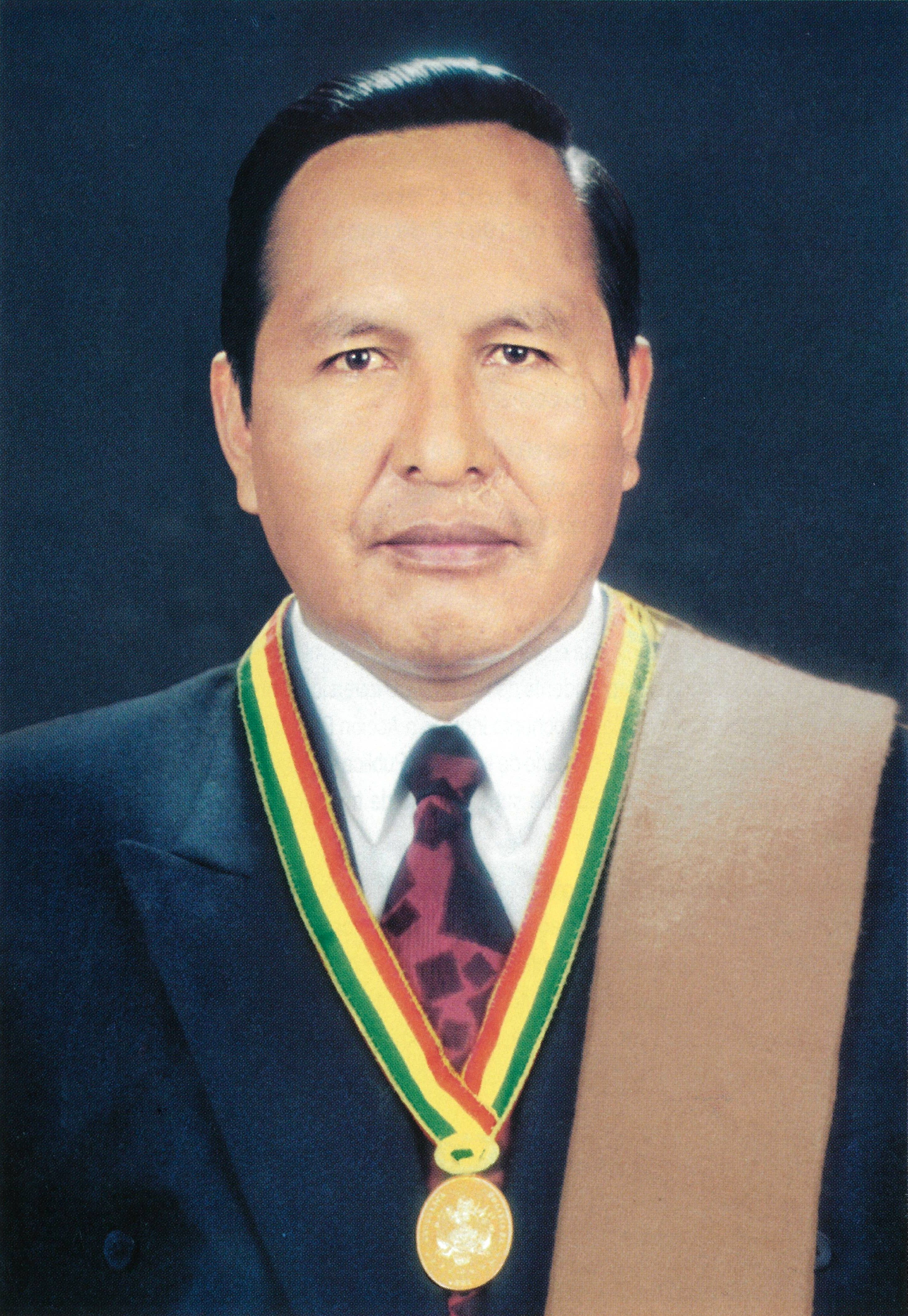
- Official portrait, 1993

35th Vice President of Bolivia
- In office 6 August 1993 – 6 August 1997
- President: Gonzalo Sánchez de Lozada
- Preceded by: Luis Ossio
- Succeeded by: Jorge Quiroga

Minister of Education (Note: Cárdenas was minister on 4 June 2020, when the office changed names to Ministry of Education, Sports, and Cultures. Because the department merely changed names, his term continued uninterrupted.)
- In office 20 October 2020 – 6 November 2020
- President: Jeanine Áñez
- Preceded by: Reynaldo Paredes (acting)
- Succeeded by: Adrián Quelca
- In office 28 January 2020 – 19 October 2020
- President: Jeanine Áñez
- Preceded by: Virginia Patty
- Succeeded by: Reynaldo Paredes (acting)

Member of the Chamber of Deputies from La Paz
- In office 3 August 1985 – 2 August 1989
- Preceded by: Vicente Mendoza
- Succeeded by: Luis Vásquez
- Constituency: Party list

Personal details
- Born: Víctor Hugo Choquehuanca Conde; 4 June 1951 (age 75) Achica Abajo, La Paz, Bolivia
- Party: Túpac Katari Revolutionary Liberation Movement (1985–2003)
- Other political affiliations: Túpac Katari Revolutionary Movement (1978–1985)
- Spouse: Lidia Katari
- Education: Higher University of San Andrés
- Occupation: Educator; trade unionist

Víctor Hugo Cárdenas Conde (Note: In this Spanish name, the first or paternal surname is Cárdenas and the second or maternal family name is Conde.) (né Choquehuanca; born 4 June 1951) is a Bolivian indigenous rights activist and politician who served as the 35th vice president of Bolivia from 1993 to 1997. He is the first Aymara vice president and was the highest-ranking indigenous official in Bolivian history before Evo Morales became president in 2006.

Born in Achica Bajo, on the shores of Lake Titicaca, Cárdenas was the son of a rural school teacher. When he was still a child, his father changed his name from Choquehuanca to Cárdenas, in order to mask his indigenous origin and remove what at the time was an obstacle to his educational and professional advancement. His wife has never renounced the typical dress of the chola, an urbanized woman who retains her indigenous identity.

Cárdenas holds a PhD in linguistics and is a university professor.

Cárdenas was an unsuccessful candidate in the 2009 Bolivian presidential election, losing to Evo Morales. He claimed that his ticket was seeking a national consensus rather than division. He was appointed Minister of Education in the government of President Jeanine Añez, overseeing school interruptions and the implementation of virtual education during the coronavirus pandemic. He was dismissed on 19 October after being censured by the Legislative Assembly.

== Notes ==
Political offices
Preceded by Luis Ossio	Vice President of Bolivia; 1993–1997	Succeeded by Jorge Quiroga
