= Túpac Katari =

Indigenous Aymara insurrection leader

- Katari depicted in anonymous watercolor from c. 1784–1806 in the Viceroyalty of the Río de la Plata.
- Born: Julián Apasa Nina c. 1750; Sica Sica, Real Audiencia of Charcas (now Bolivia)
- Died: 13 November 1781 (aged 30–31)
- Other names: Catari, Túpaj Katari

Túpac Katari or Catari (also Túpaj Katari) (c. 1750 – 13 November 1781), born Julián Apasa Nina, was an indigenous Aymara leader who started a major rebellion in colonial-era Upper Peru (now Bolivia), laying siege to La Paz for six months. His wife Bartolina Sisa and his sister Gregoria Apaza participated in the rebellion by his side. The rebellion was ultimately put down by Spanish loyalists and Katari was executed by quartering.

== Biography ==
Two variations of Tupac Katari's Wiphala

Katari was born Julián Apasa in the jurisdiction of Sicasica and later moved to the nearby town of Ayo Ayo. He was born a peasant and worked as a trader of coca and baize.

A member of the Aymara, Apasa took the name "Tupac Katari" to honor two earlier rebel leaders: Tomás Katari and Túpac Amaru, executed by the Spanish in 1572. Katari's uprising occurred at the same time as the rebellion of Túpac Amaru II, whose cacique leader claimed to be a descendant of the earlier Túpac Amaru. Túpac Katari had no traditional claim to leadership similar to that of Túpac Amaru II, which may well have prompted Katari to associate himself with earlier leaders. Katari means "serpent, large snake" in Aymara; Amaru means the same in Quechua, the language of Tupac Amaru. Tupac means "brilliant, resplendent" in both languages.

=== Rebellion against Spanish rule ===
Katari's uprising was the largest of the indigenous rebellions geographically and garnered the most support. It took the affected viceroyalties two years to suppress.

During a stage of his own, separate rebellion, Tupac Amaru II was able to convince the Quechua speakers to join him. Therefore, under his command, the Quechua speakers fought alongside him with Aymara-speaking rebels from Puno on Lake Titicaca and on the Bolivian side of the lake. Unfortunately, the alliance did not last that long and this led Túpac Katari to lead his army alone. Katari claimed to be the viceroy appointed by Tupac Amaru II.

In 1781, Katari raised an army of some 40,000 soldiers and laid siege to the Spanish city of La Paz on 13 March 1781. Katari and his wife Bartolina Sisa set up court in El Alto, and maintained the siege for one hundred and nine days from March until June. The rebels failed to take control of La Paz due to fierce resistance and support to the city's garrison by troops sent from Buenos Aires. In this context, Viceroy Agustín de Jáuregui took advantage of the low morale of the rebels by offering amnesty to those who surrendered, an offer which many rebels accepted, including some leaders of the movement. Túpac Katari, who had not accepted the amnesty and went to Achacachi to reorganize his dispersed forces, was betrayed by some of his followers and was captured by the Spanish on the night of 9 November 1781.

The rebels besieged La Paz again in August, joined by Andrés Túpac Amaru, a nephew of Túpac Amaru II and romantically linked to Gregoria Apaza, Katari's younger sister.

Sisa was a commander of the siege and played a crucial role in the rebellion following Katari's capture in April. The siege was broken by the Spanish colonial troops who advanced from Lima and Buenos Aires. 20,000 people died during the siege, which finally ended in October.

By 5 August, Túpac Katari and his forces had besieged the city, and a few weeks later they were joined by forces led by Andrés Túpac Amaru. In mid-September, another cousin of the Inca rebel leader, Miguel Bastidas Túpac Amaru, arrived to help prosecute the siege before it was finally broken by Spanish loyalists led by Josef Reseguín on 17 October 1781. As the royalist noose tightened, Túpac Katari was captured and was executed on November 13. Diego Cristóbal Túpac Amaru was captured at Marcapata in Quispicanchis on 15 March 1782. Having no alternatives to survive, Miguel Bastidas Túpac Amaru obtained a pardon by assisting the Spanish in suppressing what was left of the rebellion.

Both attempts ended in failure due to political and military maneuvers by the Spanish, as well as alliances with indigenous leaders against Túpac Katari. Eventually all the remaining leaders of the rebellion were arrested and executed, including Túpac Katari's wife, Bartolina Sisa, and his sister, Gregoria Apaza.

As a reward for the efforts and sacrifices that the Spanish of the city of La Paz had to endure, through the royal decree of 20 May 1784, the city of La Paz was awarded the title of "noble, courageous and faithful" (faithful to the king of Spain, it is understood).

=== Execution ===
Katari was executed by Spanish authorities on 15 November 1781. According to oral tradition, his final words were, "Nayawa jiwtxa nayjarusti waranqa waranqanakawa kutanipxa". This is translated from Aymara as "I die but will return tomorrow as thousand thousands".

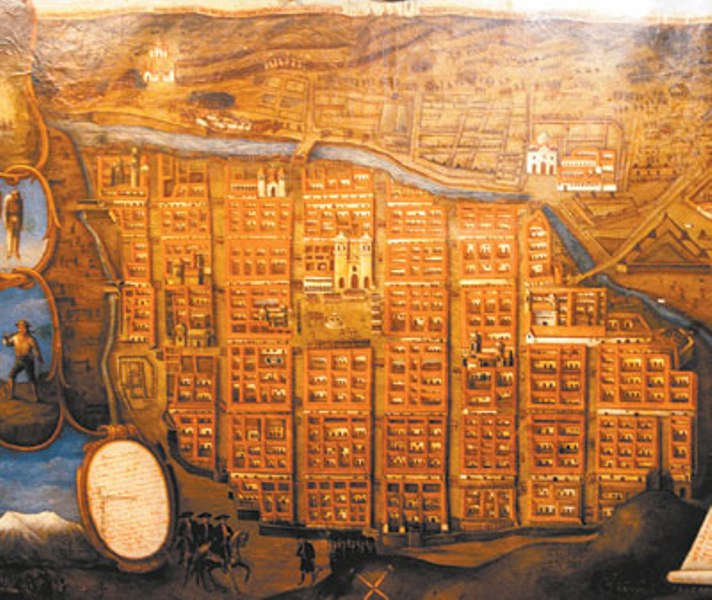
Plan of the city of La Paz in 1781

== Legacy ==
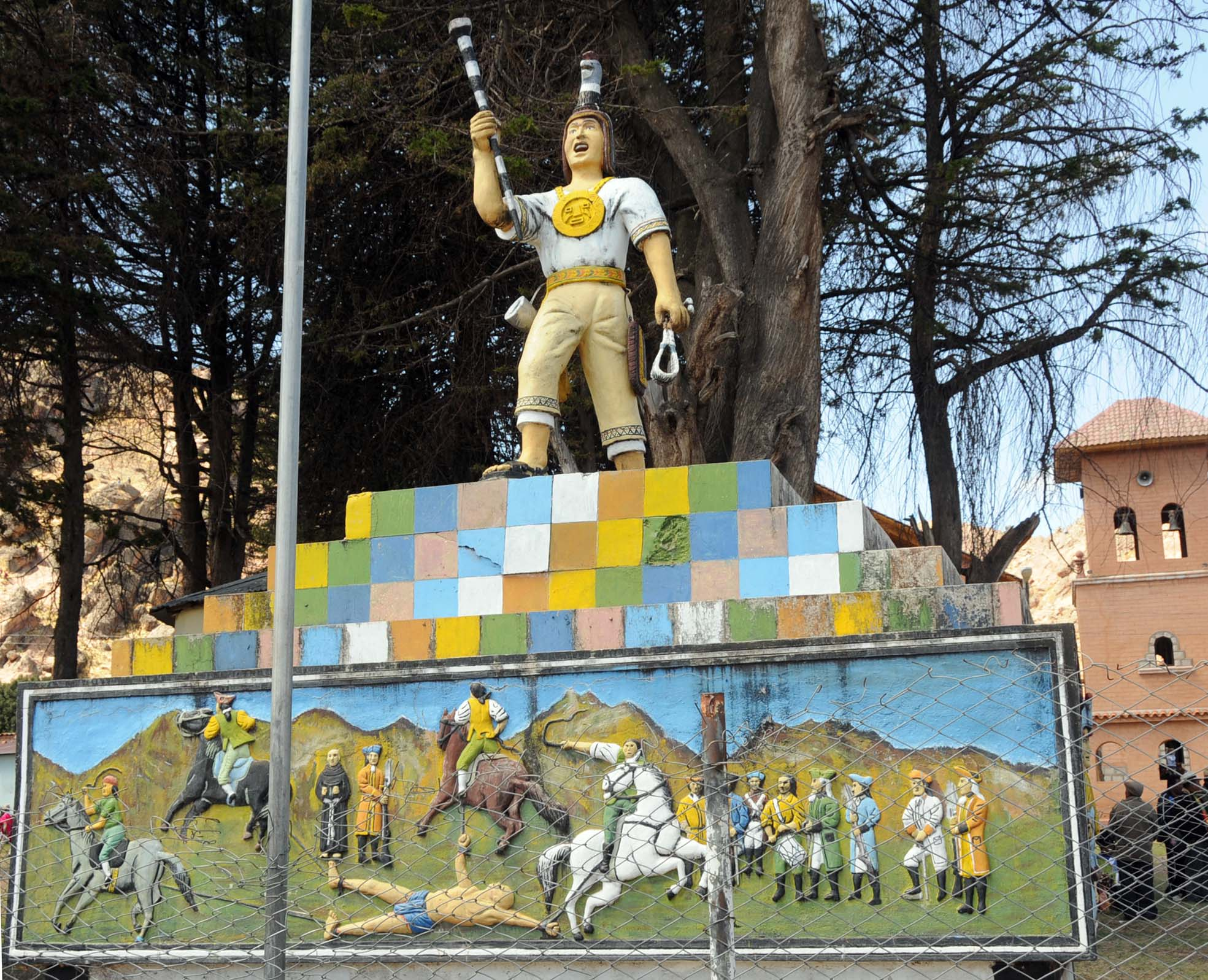
Monument of Túpac Katari, in the town of Peñas

For his effort, his betrayal, defeat, torture and brutal execution, Túpac Katari is remembered as a hero by modern indigenous movements in Bolivia, who call their political philosophy Katarismo. A Bolivian guerrilla group, the Túpac Katari Guerrilla Army, also bears his name.

Katari had a reputation as a fierce and often violent leader. Other leaders in the rebel camps testified to his "homicides and enormous violence"; he was known not only for violence toward his enemies but also those who fought on his side, executing people for having "spoken against him, stolen his property, acted in an overweening fashion, challenged his authority, or humiliated him".

In Bolivia, on 15 July 2005, former President Eduardo Rodríguez Veltzé declared (through Law No. 3102) "National Aymara Hero and Heroine to Julián Apaza and Bartolina Sisa".

In Argentina, as part of the Bicentennial celebrations, a Gallery of South American Patriots was inaugurated on 25 May 2010, in which Bolivia is represented by portraits of Túpac Katari, Pedro Domingo Murillo and Bartolina Sisa. The pictorial sample is located in the so-called "Hall of the Bicentennial Heroes", in the Casa Rosada.

The first Bolivian telecommunications satellite, Túpac Katari 1, whose purpose is to support educational initiatives and maintain state security, bears his name.

Since 2019, his appearance has been incorporated into the new design of the 200 Bolivian banknote.

== See also ==
- Túpac Amaru II
- Rebellion of Túpac Amaru II
- Tomás Katari
- Aymara people
- Bolivia
- Bartolina Sisa
- Katarismo
- Túpac Katari Guerrilla Army
