= Néstor Guzmán Villarroel =

Bolivian politician (born 1964)

Néstor Guzman Villarroel (born February 26, 1964, in Chaguarmayu) is a Bolivian politician and trade unionist.

== Biography ==
A tailor and farmer by profession, he became the press and propaganda secretary of the trade union in Chaguarmayu in 1984, then becoming the relations secretary of the Chaguarmayu trade union the following year.

Between 1986 and 1988, he was the general secretary of the Panamá trade union sub-centre, then becoming the general secretary of the Aiquile-Campero Provincial Trade Union Centre.

Between 1995 and 1997, he was secretary of tracts of the Federación Unica de Trabajadores Campesinos de Cochabamba (FUTCCBA).

In 1997, he was elected to the Chamber of Deputies, as the United Left (IU) candidate in the single-member constituency No. 29 (which covers areas of the Campero and Arani provinces). Roberto Céspedes Franco was his alternate.

In the 2005 parliamentary election, Guzmán Villarroel topped the Indigenous Pachakuti Movement (MIP) list for the proportional representation vote in Cochabamba.
