= Túpac Katari Guerrilla Army =

Bolivian guerrilla movement

The Túpac Katari Guerrilla Army (Ejército Guerrillero Túpac Katari) was a guerrilla movement in Bolivia. Albeit of indigenist inspiration, the movement had a multiracial membership. The organization descended directly from the original revolutionaries trained by Che Guevara in the 1960s. Their objective was to fight for social equality in Bolivia and amongst its indigenous population. They carried out their first attack on July 5, 1991, destroying an electric power pylon in El Alto, a major city which adjoins La Paz, Bolivia's administrative capital. Most of the group's attacks have been similarly small-scale and they had confined their activities largely to Bolivia. The group suffered a major setback in a crackdown in 1992, when much of its leadership was neutralized through incarceration.

The group was named after Túpac Katari, a colonial-era indigenous revolutionary. One of their former members, Álvaro García Linera, has served as the vice-president of Bolivia.

== See also ==
- UMOPAR
- EZLN
