= Alejo Véliz (politician) =

Bolivian politician (born 1957)

Alejandro "Alejo" Véliz Lazo (born 9 February 1957) is a Bolivian politician and activist. He is a member of the ASP party. Véliz is a former executive secretary of the Federación Sindical Única de Trabajadores Campesinos de Cochabamba (FSUTCC), and former Secretary General of the Confederación Sindical Única de Trabajadores Campesinos de Bolivia (CSUTCB). In 2002 he concluded a political alliance with Manfred Reyes Villa and his New Republican Force.
