= 1980 Bolivian general election =

- 29 June 1980
- Registered: 2,004,284
- Turnout: 74.32% (▼15.9pp)
- Presidential election

President and Vice President
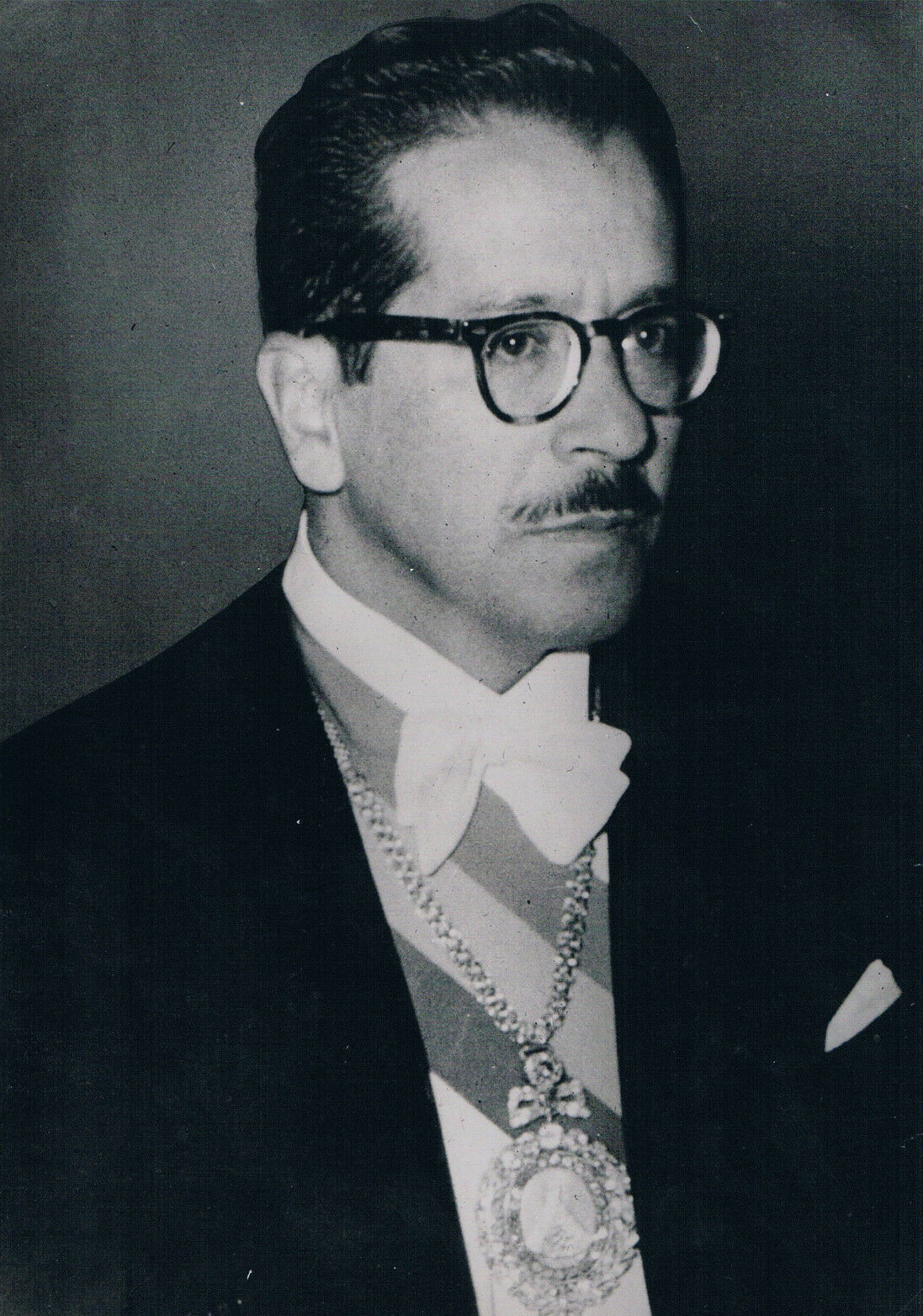

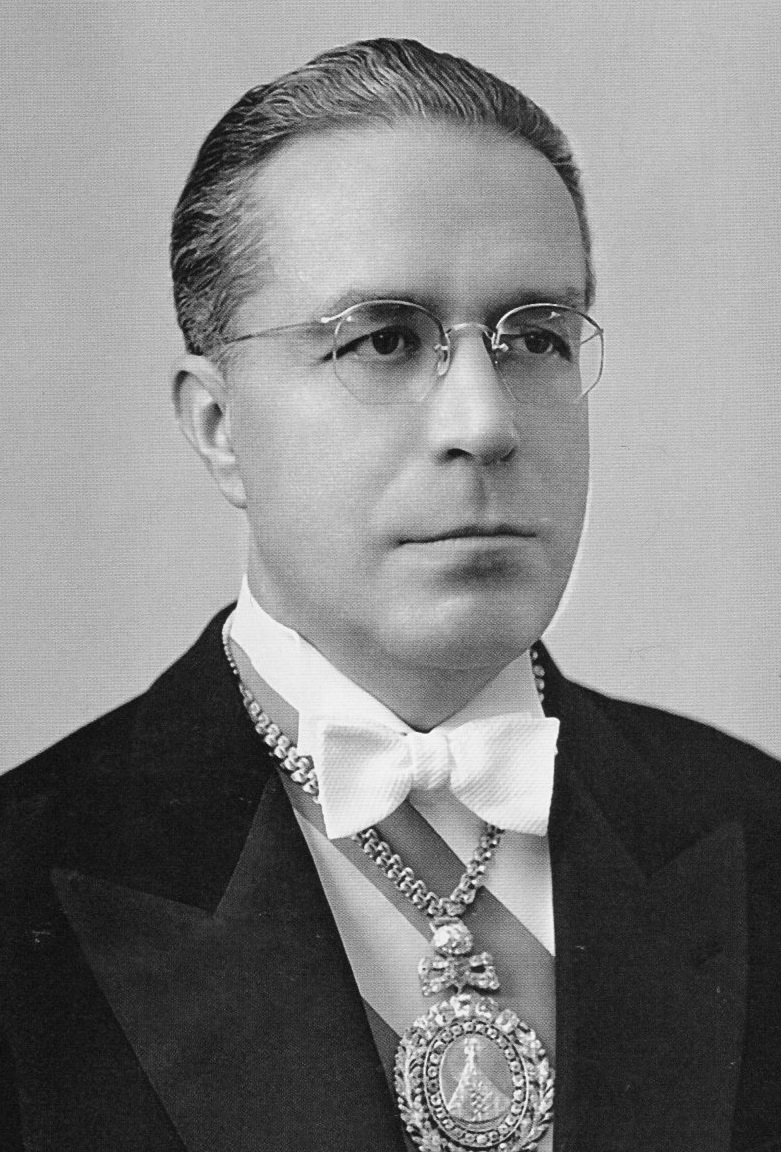

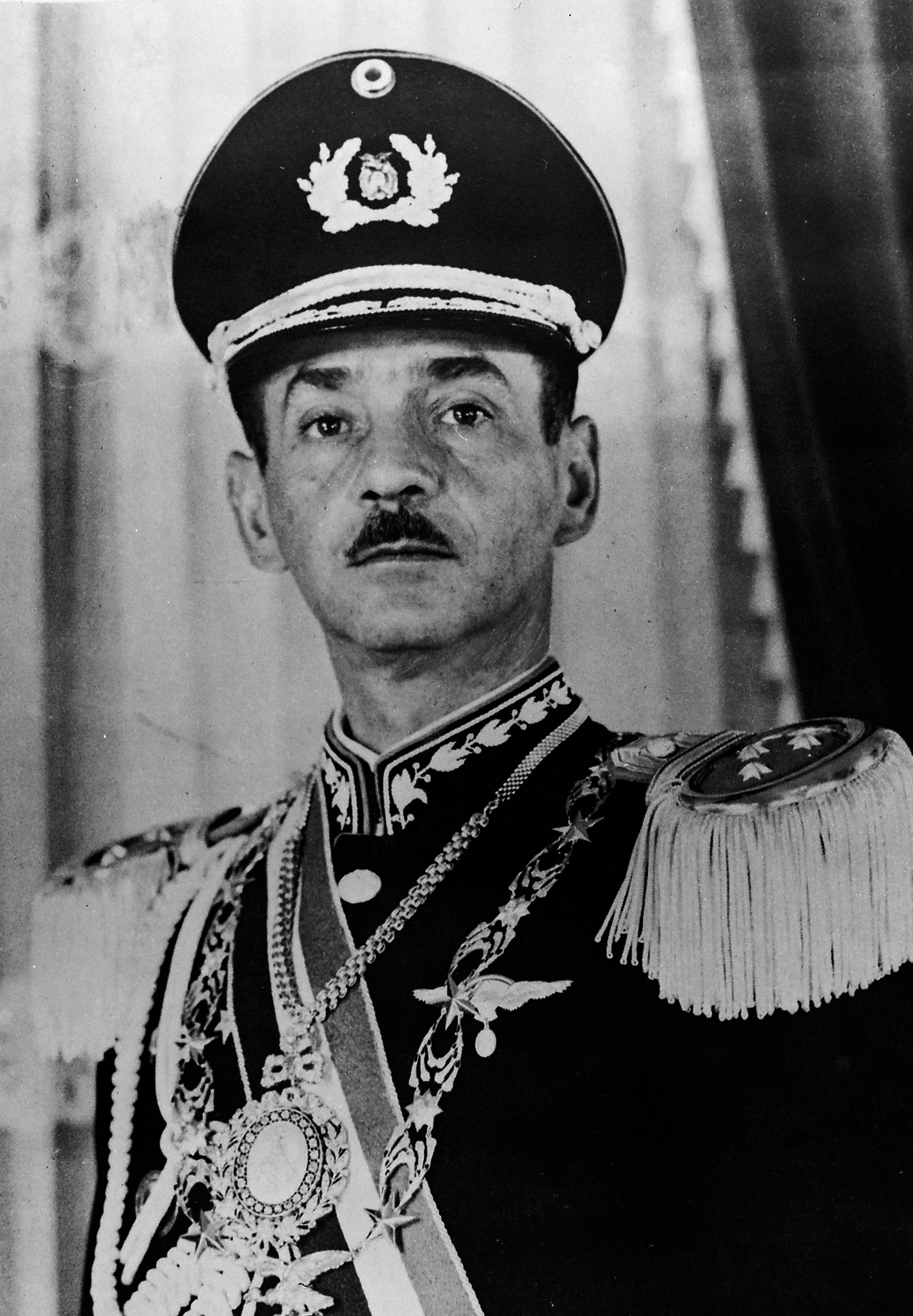

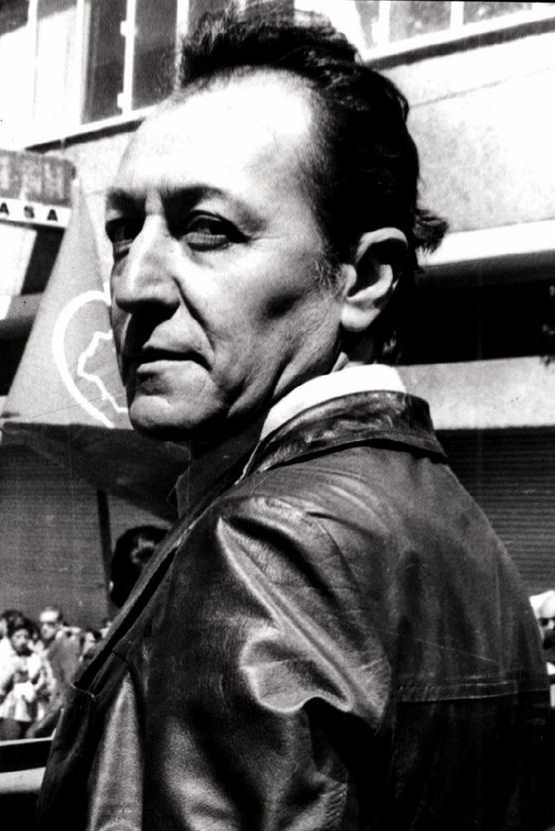
Nominee	Hernán Siles Zuazo	Víctor Paz Estenssoro
Party	MNRI	MNR
Alliance	UDP (Note: Coalition consisting of more than 11 parties including MNRI, MIR, PCB, MPLN, VO, and PS-A)	MNR-A (Note: Coalition consisting of MNR, MNRI-1, and PCB (ML))
Running mate	Jaime Paz Zamora	Ñuflo Chávez Ortiz
Popular vote	507,173	263,706
Percentage	38.74%	20.15%
Nominee	Hugo Banzer	Marcelo Quiroga Santa Cruz
Party	ADN	PS-1
Running mate	Jorge Tamayo Ramos	José María Palacios
Popular vote	220,309	113,959
Percentage	16.83%	8.71%
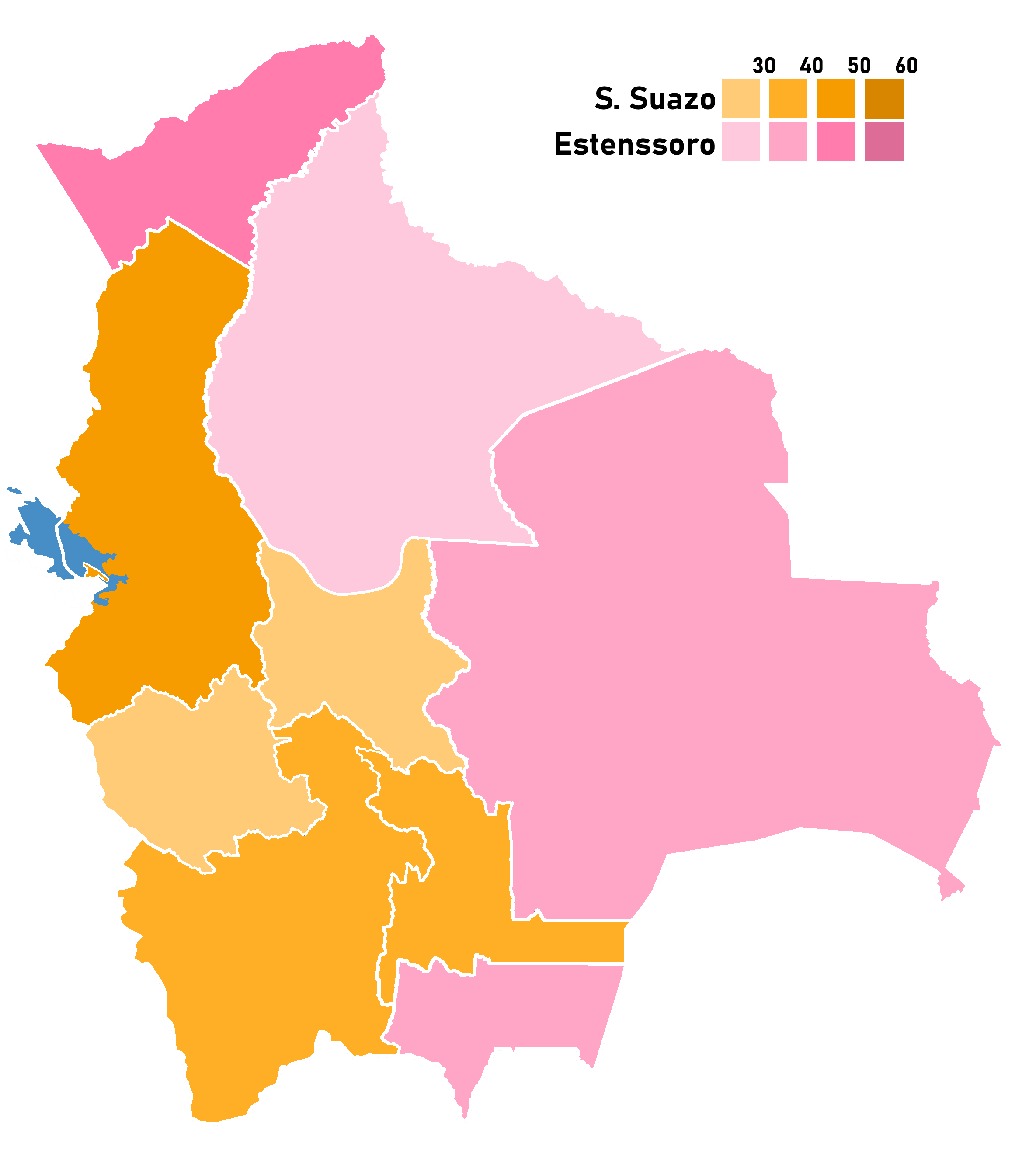
- Results by department
President before election
Lidia Gueiler Tejada (interim)
PRIN
Elected President
Election results annulled
Luis García Meza becomes de facto president
Hernán Siles Zuazo
After 10 October 1982
MNRI

General elections were held in Bolivia on 29 June 1980, the third in three years. As no candidate in the presidential elections received a majority of the vote, the National Congress was required to elect a President on 6 August. With Hernán Siles Zuazo of the Democratic and Popular Union the favourite to win the Congressional ballot, the process was disrupted on 17 July by the military coup led by General Luis García Meza Tejada. However, Meza was pressured to resign on 4 August 1981, resulting in General Celso Torrelio becoming president. In July 1982 he was replaced by General Guido Vildoso, who was named by the high command to return the country to democratic rule. On 17 September 1982, during a general strike that brought the country close to civil war, the military decided to step down, to reconvene the National Congress elected in 1980, and to accept its choice of president. Accordingly, the National Congress revalidated the 1980 election results on 23 September and overwhelmingly elected Hernán Siles Zuazo as president on 5 October. He subsequently assumed the presidency on 10 October 1982.

== Background ==
The 1978 elections were the first since 1966, with several military coups taking place during the late 1960s and early 1970s. Although Juan Pereda of the Nationalist Union of the People won the presidential elections, more votes were cast than there were registered voters. After examining a number of allegations of fraud and other irregularities, the Electoral Court decided to annul the results on 20 July. The following day, Pereda was installed as president following a military coup. Pereda himself was overthrown by yet another military coup in November, which saw General David Padilla assume the presidency, promising to hold fresh elections in July the following year.

In the subsequent elections in July 1979, no candidate for president received over 50% of the vote. When Congress was required to elect a president, it failed to come to a majority agreement after three ballots. Instead, Senate leader Wálter Guevara was elected to serve as interim president for a year on 8 August. However, Guevara was later overthrown by another military coup led by Alberto Natusch on 31 October and 1 November.

Natusch himself would only last sixteen days in office, after which he was forced to resign. To save face, Natusch extracted from Congress an agreement that Guevara would not resume the interim presidency. As such, Congress instead elected Lidia Gueiler Tejada, then leader of the Chamber of Deputies, as interim president. Gueiler called new elections to be held on 29 June 1980, the third consecutive presidential election in a row.

== Campaign ==
13 candidates presented themselves for the 1980 elections including a total of 5 former presidents. Hernán Siles Zuazo, narrow popular vote winner of the 1979 election, returned with his Democratic and Popular Union (UDP) coalition while the Revolutionary Nationalist Movement-Alliance (MNR-A) once again presented MNR leader Víctor Paz Estenssoro as their candidate with Ñuflo Chávez Ortiz, former vice president to Siles Zuazo, as Paz Estenssoro's running mate.

Paz Estenssoro was faced with the repercussions of Alberto Natusch's 1 November coup. This was due to the fact that certain congressional members of the MNR, most notably Guillermo Bedregal and José Fellman, had participated in the coup that brought Alberto Natusch to power. Paz Estenssoro had also been himself accused of participating in the planning of the coup, though this could not be proven. The scandal resulted in a fracturing of the MNR-A. Wálter Guevara, whose interim presidency had been cut short by the coup, withdrew the support of his Authentic Revolutionary Party (PRA) as did the Christian Democratic Party (PDC). Further, left-wing members of the MNR split from the party and formed the Alliance of Nationalist Left Forces of the MNR (AFIN-MNR) followed shortly thereafter by right-wing members of the MNR who formed the United Revolutionary Nationalist Movement (MNRU).

The PRA and AFIN-MNR ran their own campaigns with the PRA presenting Wálter Guevara and Flavio Machicado Saravia and AFIN-MNR presenting Roberto Jordán Pando and Edmundo Roca. The MNRU joined in alliance with another MNR splinter group, the left-wing Movement of the National Left (MIN), and presented as their candidate Guillermo Bedregal with his running mate Miguel Trigo.

In Spring 1980, the PDC joined the Alliance of the National Left (ADIN), Socialist Party-Guillermo Aponte (PS-Aponte), Revolutionary Workers Party Trotskyist-Posadist (POR-TP), and Offensive of the Democratic Left (OID), in forming the Democratic Revolutionary Front–New Alternative (FDR-NA). The coalition presented Luis Adolfo Siles Salinas, former president and half-brother of Hernán Siles Zuazo, as their candidate with Benjamin Miguel Harb as his running mate.

Continued support for Hugo Banzer by a sizeable sector of the Bolivian population cemented him and his party, the Nationalist Democratic Action (ADN), as a major faction in Bolivian politics. The 1980 campaign also saw the rise of Marcelo Quiroga Santa Cruz of the Socialist Party – 1 (PS-1). Previously a minor candidate in 1978 and 1979, Quiroga gained notability as a deputy in the 1979 legislature for placing Banzer on trial for the crimes committed during Banzer's seven years of dictatorship, displaying extraordinary oratorical skills, as well as a lucid analytical and critical capacity.

Hanging over the campaign were signs that certain sectors of the military were not prepared to allow a democratic transition. It was feared that, depending on who won, the military would not accept the results. Ominously, the ultra-right wing of the Bolivian military began to indicate that it would not stand for the installation of the "extremist" Siles Zuazo and Paz Zamora. On 2 June 1980, just 27 days before the scheduled election date, a plane carrying six UDP politicians including Hernán Siles Zuazo's running mate, Jaime Paz Zamora, crashed over the Altiplano. Two crew men and five UDP politicians died with the only survivor being Paz Zamora who suffered permanent burn scarring on his face. The plane had belonged to a company owned by Colonel Luis Arce in what was undoubtedly an assassination attempt.

== Results ==
The results once again favored Hernán Siles Zuazo and the UDP. However, contrary to the 0.1% difference between Siles Zuazo and Paz Estenssoro in the 1979 election, this time the former won by 18.5 points. This was likely on account of the splintering of the MNR and the sullied image of Paz Estenssoro following the Natusch coup. Despite the UDP victory on the presidential level, the new composition of the National Congress did not indicate a clear majority for any party. The only two absolute majorities in departments corresponded to the UDP in La Paz, and the MNR in Pando.

The results foreshadowed a trend in subsequent elections in which left parties generally received a higher vote share in the western departments while more conservative parties were victorious in the eastern departments. Both the UDP and the PS-1 achieved their best performances in the west while the Bolivian Socialist Falange (FSB) and ADN were more successful in the east.

Party	Presidential candidate	Votes	%	Seats			
Party	Presidential candidate	Votes	%	Chamber	+/–	Senate	+/–
Democratic and Popular Union	Hernán Siles Zuazo	507,173	38.74	47	+9	10	+2
Revolutionary Nationalist Movement–Alliance	Víctor Paz Estenssoro	263,706	20.15	34	–14	10	–6
Nationalist Democratic Action	Hugo Banzer	220,309	16.83	24	+5	6	+3
Socialist Party – 1	Marcelo Quiroga Santa Cruz	113,959	8.71	10	+5	1	+1
Democratic Revolutionary Front–New Alternative	Luis Adolfo Siles Salinas	39,401	3.01	5	New	0	New
Authentic Revolutionary Party	Wálter Guevara	36,443	2.78	3	+3	0	0
MNRU–MIN	Guillermo Bedregal	24,542	1.87	2	New	0	New
Bolivian Socialist Falange	Carlos Valverde	21,372	1.63	3	+3	0	0
Alliance of Nationalist Left Forces of the MNR	Roberto Jordán Pando	17,150	1.31	0	New	0	New
Túpac Katari Indian Movement – 1	Constantino Lima	17,023	1.30	1	New	0	New
Bolivian Union Party	Walter Gonzáles Valda	16,380	1.25	0	–1	0	0
Túpac Katari Indian Movement	Luciano Tapia Quisbert	15,852	1.21	1	+1	0	0
Revolutionary Party of the Nationalist Left	Juan Lechín Oquendo	15,724	1.20	0	0	0	0
Total		1,309,034	100.00	130	+13	27	0
Valid votes		1,309,034	87.89				
Invalid/blank votes		180,450	12.11				
Total votes		1,489,484	100.00				
Registered voters/turnout		2,004,284	74.32				
Source: Órgano Electoral Plurinacional, Nohlen

=== By department ===
Department	ADN	MNR	UDP	PS-1	Others
Beni	26.71%	36.27%	19.32%	1.59%	16.11%
Chuquisaca	11.89%	20.84%	44.41%	7.08%	15.79%
Cochabamba	18.84%	13.67%	31.59%	12.83%	23.07%
La Paz	16.29%	8.80%	51.64%	9.12%	14.15%
Oruro	12.58%	17.69%	34.07%	17.87%	17.80%
Pando	18.05%	51.72%	12.96%	0.96%	16.31%
Potosi	9.11%	24.10%	42.68%	7.02%	17.10%
Santa Cruz	22.66%	40.20%	21.52%	4.42%	11.22%
Tarija	19.93%	48.05%	18.55%	3.05%	10.42%
Source: Constituency-Level Election Archive

== Aftermath ==
=== Cocaine coup ===
The lack of a 50% majority for any candidate meant that the National Congress would convene to elect the president on 6 August 1980. However, on 17 July a coup led by General Luis García Meza overthrew the interim government of Lidia Gueiler Tejada. Lacking any form of political support, the García Meza regime quickly implemented oppressive measures. On the day of the coup, Marcelo Quiroga Santa Cruz of the PS-1 was arrested by the military during an assault on the Bolivian Workers' Center. Santa Cruz was subsequently shot dead. The election results were annulled and major political leaders went into exile, including Siles Zuazo who crossed Lake Titicaca and fled to Peru. Those who could not escape either went into hiding or were arrested or executed such as the 8 MIR leaders who were tortured and executed during the Harrington Street Massacre of 15 January 1981.

=== Return to democracy ===
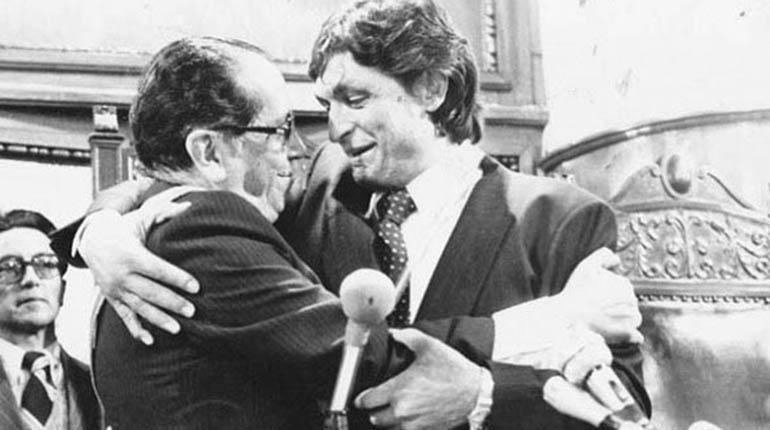
Siles Zuazo and Paz Zamora are sworn-in on 10 October 1982

The brutal excesses of the García Meza dictatorship would only last a year. Pressure by the United States coupled with internal struggles between separate military factions ultimately resulted in the army forcing García Meza to resign on 4 August 1981. He was succeeded by a military triumvirate which on 4 September appointed the left-wing General Celso Torrelio president. The Torrelio government was equally oppressive but only lasted another year. On 19 July 1982, the military once again secured the resignation of the president. A new military triumvirate was formed which appointed Guido Vildoso president on 21 July.

The Vildoso government accelerated the re-democratization process. Seeing the grave situation in the country, the military opted not to call new elections and instead accepted the 1980 results. The junta recalled the 1980 Congress and promised to accept its choice of president. Congress reconvened on 23 September and elected Hernán Siles Zuazo on 5 October. Vildoso formally transferred command to Siles Zuazo on 10 October 1982.

=== Congressional ballot ===
Party	Presidential candidate	Votes	%
Democratic and Popular Union	Hernán Siles Zuazo	113	71.97
Nationalist Democratic Action	Hugo Banzer	29	18.47
Invalid votes		4	2.55
Abstained		11	7.01
Total		157	100
Source: Ontiveros

== Bibliography ==
- Gisbert, Carlos D. Mesa (2003). Presidentes de Bolivia: entre urnas y fusiles : el poder ejecutivo, los ministros de estado (in Spanish). Editorial Gisbert.
