= Bolivian National Congress, 1966–1969 =

The Bolivian National Congress 1966–1969 was elected on 3 July 1966.

== Chamber of Deputies ==
Deputy	Alliance	Party	Department
Alberto Cabezas Usin	FRB		Potosí
Alberto Sánchez Rossel	FRB		Tarija
Alfredo Calvo Vera	FRB		Potosí
Alvaro Bedregal Iturri	FRB	PIR	La Paz
Ambrosio García Ribera	CDC	FSB	Beni
Angel Tellería Gonzáles	FRB	MPC	La Paz
Antonio Anze Jiménez	CDC	FSB	Cochabamba
Antonio Burgoa Ortiz	FRB		La Paz
Armando Llanos Mercado	FRB		Beni
Armando Puente Ullunque	FRB		Potosí
Arturo González Gómez	FRB		Oruro
Arturo Ruescas Quisbert	FRB	MPC	La Paz
Aurelio Aireyú Torniri	FRB		Santa Cruz
Benedicto Rodríguez Vías	FRB		Santa Cruz
Braulio Peñaranda Peñaloza	FRB		La Paz
Braulio Ramos Quiroz	FRB		Oruro
Casta Chávez Cortez	FRB		Beni
Ciríaco Guzmán Moya	FRB		Cochabamba
Conrado Peramás Cardona	FRB		Cochabamba
Cristóbal Vargas Tarqui	FRB		Oruro
Daniel Delgado Cuevas	CDC	FSB	Potosí
Darío Duran Gutiérrez	CDC	FSB	Beni
David Añez Pedraza	CDC	FSB	Cochabamba
Dick Oblitas Velarde	CDC	FSB	La Paz
Donato Urey Carvalo	FRB	MPC	Cochabamba
Edgar Arduz Tejerina	FRB		Cochabamba
Edgar Ortiz Lema	FRB	PRA	Tarija
Edgar Prudencio Velasco	FRB	MPC	Cochabamba
Edwin Tapia Frontanilla	FRB	MPC	La Paz
Eliseo Gutierrez	FRB	MPC	La Paz
Emilio Silva Pinto	FRB		La Paz
Enrique Rau Barba	FRB		Santa Cruz
Félix Pinto Saucedo	FRB		Beni
Florencio Alvarado	FRB	MPC	Tarija
Francisco Matijasevich Morgan	FRB		Potosí
Franz Ondarza Linares	FRB	MPC	Cochabamba
Franz Tezanos Pinto	CDC	FSB	La Paz
Froilán Ayllón Quevedo	FRB		La Paz
Gastón Pacheco Arana	FRB	MPC	Chuquisaca
Germán Subiaurre Velásquez	FRB		Potosí
Germán Vargas Martínez	FRB	PIR	La Paz
Gonzalo Romero Alvarez García	CDC	FSB	La Paz
Gregorio López Orellana	FRB		Cochabamba
Grover Villegas Gallo	FRB		Potosí
Guido Parada Parada	FRB		Santa Cruz
Guillermo Paz Arauco	FRB		Cochabamba
Gustavo Chacón Sánchez	FRB		Pando
Gustavo Stumpff Belmonte	CDC	FSB	La Paz
Héctor Anaya Arze	FRB	PIR	Cochabamba
Héctor Borda Leaño	CDC	FSB	Oruro
Hugo Bohórquez Ramírez	FRB	PIR	Potosí
Hugo Tórrez Suárez	FRB		Potosí
Humberto Luna Tito	FRB		Potosí
Iván Angulo Flores	FRB		Cochabamba
Jaime Arellano Castañeda	MNR-Paz	MNR-Paz	Tarija
Jaime Villegas Duran	FRB		Potosí
Jorge Arteaga Flores	FRB		Pando
Jorge del Villar Solares	CDC	FSB	Potosí
Jorge Ríos Gamarra	FRB	PRA	La Paz
José Calderón Llerena	FRB		La Paz
José Lucio Alvéstegui Bustillo	FRB		Oruro
José Ortiz Mercado	FRB	MPC	Oruro
Julio Cadena Mamani	FRB		La Paz
Julio De Zavala Urriolagoitia	CDC	FSB	Chuquisaca
Lionel Aliaga Encinas	FRB		La Paz
Luis Ballivián Ch.	FRB		Beni
Luis Caballero Arias	FRB		Chuquisaca
Macedonio Juárez Zambrana	FRB	PRA	Chuquisaca
Manuel Camargo Montero	FRB		Beni
Manuel Zabala Ribero	FRB		Pando
Marcelo Quiroga Santa Cruz	CDC	ind	Cochabamba
Mariano Padilla Flores	FRB		Chuquisaca
Mariano Romero Palacios	FRB		Chuquisaca
Mario Arancibia Herrera	CDC	FSB	Chuquisaca
Mario Cossío Sejas	FRB		Tarija
Mario Estenssoro Vásquez	FRB	PSD	Tarija
Mario Franco Franco	CDC	FSB	Santa Cruz
Mario Gonzalo Rodríguez	FRB	PIR	La Paz
Mario Pinto Rojas	FRB		Santa Cruz
Mario Quiniela Vaca Diez	FRB		Santa Cruz
Mario Ribera Vaca	FRB		Pando
Mario Vargas Jordán	CDC	FSB	Santa Cruz
Miguel Salvatierra Hurtado	FRB		Santa Cruz
Pedro Carita Chamaca	FRB		Potosí
Rafael García Rosqucllas	FRB		Chuquisaca
Raúl Bravo Portocarrero	FRB		La Paz
Raúl Pinto Mollinedo	FRB		La Paz
René Baldiviezo Guzmán	FRB		Chuquisaca
René Delgadillo Zapata	FRB		Potosí
Ricardo Shimokawa Neira	CDC	FSB	Pando
Rodolfo Luzio Lazarte	FRB	PSD	Oruro
Rosendo Alcalá Oropeza	FRB		Potosí
Ruffo Oropeza Delgado	FRB	PIR	Chuquisaca
Samuel Marcos Mamani Quispe	FRB	MPC	La Paz
Silverio Rodríguez Ajhuacho	FRB		Oruro
Vicente Carranza Sánchez	FRB		Tarija
Víctor Hoz de Vila Bacarreza	FRB		Beni
Vitaliano Guzmán Gamboa	FRB		Cochabamba
Walter Garrón Chalar	CDC	FSB	Potosí
Walter Morales Aguilar	FRB		Santa Cruz
Walter Vásquez Michel	CDC	FSB	Oruro
Zacarías Plaza Fernández	FRB	MPC	Potosí

== Chamber of Senators ==
Senator	Alliance	Party	Department
Antonio Scholz	FRB	MPC	Potosí
Bernardino Bilbao Rioja	CDC	FSB	Potosí
Carlos Valverde Barbery	CDC	FSB	Santa Cruz
Carmelo Córdova Pérez	CDC	FSB	Beni
Enrique Riveros Aliaga	CDC	FSB	Pando
Guillermo Tineo Leigue	FRB	PIR	Beni
Hugo Bozo Alcócer	FRB	MPC	La Paz
Hugo Montoya Peirano	CDC	FSB	Oruro
Hugo Sandoval Saavedra	FRB	PSD	Chuquisaca
Jesús Lijerón Rodríguez	FRB	MPC	Pando
Jorge Siles Salinas	CDC	FSB	Chuquisaca
Jorge Soliz Román	FRB	MPC	Cochabamba
José Luis Joffrée González	FRB	PRA	Pando
Julio Garret Ayllón	FRB		Oruro
Lucio Paz Rivero	FRB	MPC	Santa Cruz
Luis Zurita Rodríguez	FRB		Potosí
Manfredo Kempff Mercado	FRB	PSD	Santa Cruz
Mario Olaguivel Cassón	FRB	MPC	Tarija
Mario Gutiérrez Gutiérrez	CDC	FSB	La Paz
Oscar Ortiz Avaroma	FRB	MPC	Beni
Raúl Lema Peláez	MNR-Paz	MNR-Paz	Tarija
Ricardo Anaya Arze	FRB	PIR	Cochabamba
Tobías Almaraz Mendoza	CDC	FSB	Cochabamba
Tomás Guillermo Elío	FRB	PSD	La Paz
Víctor Quinteros	FRB	PRA	Chuquisaca
Walker Humérez	FRB	MPC	Tarija
Walter Guevara Arze	FRB	PRA	Oruro

== Presidents of the National Congress ==
President	Alliance	Party		
Luis Adolfo Siles Salinas	FRB	PSD	6 August 1966	27 April 1969
Manfredo Kempff Mercado	FRB	PSD	Apr 1969	Aug 1969
Julio Campero Trigo	FRB	MPC	Aug 1969	26 September 1969

== Presidents of the Chamber of Senators ==
President	Alliance	Party		
Ricardo Anaya Arze	FRB	PIR	Aug 1966	Aug 1967
Hugo Bozo Alcócer	FRB	MPC	Aug 1967	Aug 1968
Manfredo Kempff Mercado	FRB	PSD	Aug 1968	Aug 1969
Julio Campero Trigo	FRB	MPC	Aug 1969	26 September 1969

== Presidents of the Chamber of Deputies ==
President	Alliance	Party		
Jorge Ríos Gamarra	FRB	PRA	Aug 1966	Aug 1967
Jorge Ríos Gamarra	FRB	PRA	Aug 1967	Aug 1968
Franz Ondarza Linares	FRB	MPC	Aug 1968	Aug 1969
Jorge Ríos Gamarra	FRB	PRA	Aug 1969	26 September 1969

FRB – Front of the Bolivian Revolution (Frente de la Revolución Boliviana). Electoral alliance formed by
Popular Christian Movement, MPC;
Social Democratic Party, PSD;
Revolutionary Left Party, PIR;
Authentic Revolutionary Party, PRA.

CDC – Christian Democratic Community (Comunidad Democratica Cristiana). Electoral alliance formed by
Bolivian Socialist Falange, FSB;
National Association of Democratic Professions, ANPD;
Democratic Revolutionary Alliance, ADR.

MNR-Paz – Revolutionary Nationalist Movement-Víctor Paz Estenssoro.
