= March for Left-wing Social Advancement =

Defunct electoral alliance in Bolivia

March for Left-wing Social Advancement Marcha de Avance Social de Izquierda
- Abbreviation: MASI
- Leader: Luis Adolfo Siles
- Registered: 20 April 1979
- Dissolved: 17 May 1979
- Political position: Center-left to left-wing
- Colors: Lilac
- Members: See list of members

March for Left-wing Social Advancement (Spanish: Marcha de Avance Social de Izquierda; MASI) was an electoral alliance of center-left to left-wing political parties in Bolivia. Formed on 20 April 1979, it primarily consisted of Offensive of the Democratic Left and the Socialist Party, alongside other minor parties. The alliance intended to contest the 1979 general election with Luis Adolfo Siles as its presidential candidate, alongside Guillermo Aponte as his running mate, but disintegrated before the election.

In the aftermath of the annulled 1978 general election, member parties of the Democratic and Popular Unity alliance presented Siles and Aponte as candidates for the coalition's nomination. The ticket challenged the established candidacies of Hernán Siles Zuazo and Jaime Paz Zamora, opening a rift in the alliance that resulted in both Siles and Aponte's separation. Following that, their parties began the process to establish their own front.

In April, the MASI alliance was formed, composed of OID, the PS, the Social Democratic Party, and the faction of the Left-wing Revolutionary Nationalist Movement led by Jorge Alderete. Less than two weeks after MASI's formation, Siles withdrew his candidacy. The alliance began to unravel after that, as OID and the PS deserted the front. Despite attempts to salvage MASI, the alliance was formally dissolved in May 1979, after the remaining parties abandoned the effort.

== History ==
=== Background ===
During the democratic transition of the late 1970s, the political left coalesced in large part around the Democratic and Popular Unity (UDP) alliance. Three large parties – the Communist Party of Bolivia, Left-wing Revolutionary Nationalist Movement (MNRI), and Revolutionary Left Movement – made up the nucleus of the alliance, accompanied by a multitude of minor parties and fronts. The UDP's candidate, Hernán Siles Zuazo, was the runner-up in the 1978 presidential election.

Following the annulment of the 1978 results due to government manipulation, the leading parties of the UDP moved to re-nominate Siles Zuazo for the 1979 general election. In turn, several of the alliance's smaller component parties nominated their own representatives, asserting their equal right to put forward candidates for consideration. This generated a level of conflict within the UDP. In Santa Cruz, where public antipathy toward Siles Zuazo was prominent, his half-brother, Luis Adolfo Siles Salinas, received significant support to run. He was formally proclaimed candidate for president on 30 December, accompanied by Guillermo Aponte as his running mate, by representatives of the parties they led, Offensive of the Democratic Left (OID) and the Socialist Party (PS), gathered in Santa Cruz de la Sierra. The Túpac Katari Revolutionary Movement (MRTK) also backed the nomination.

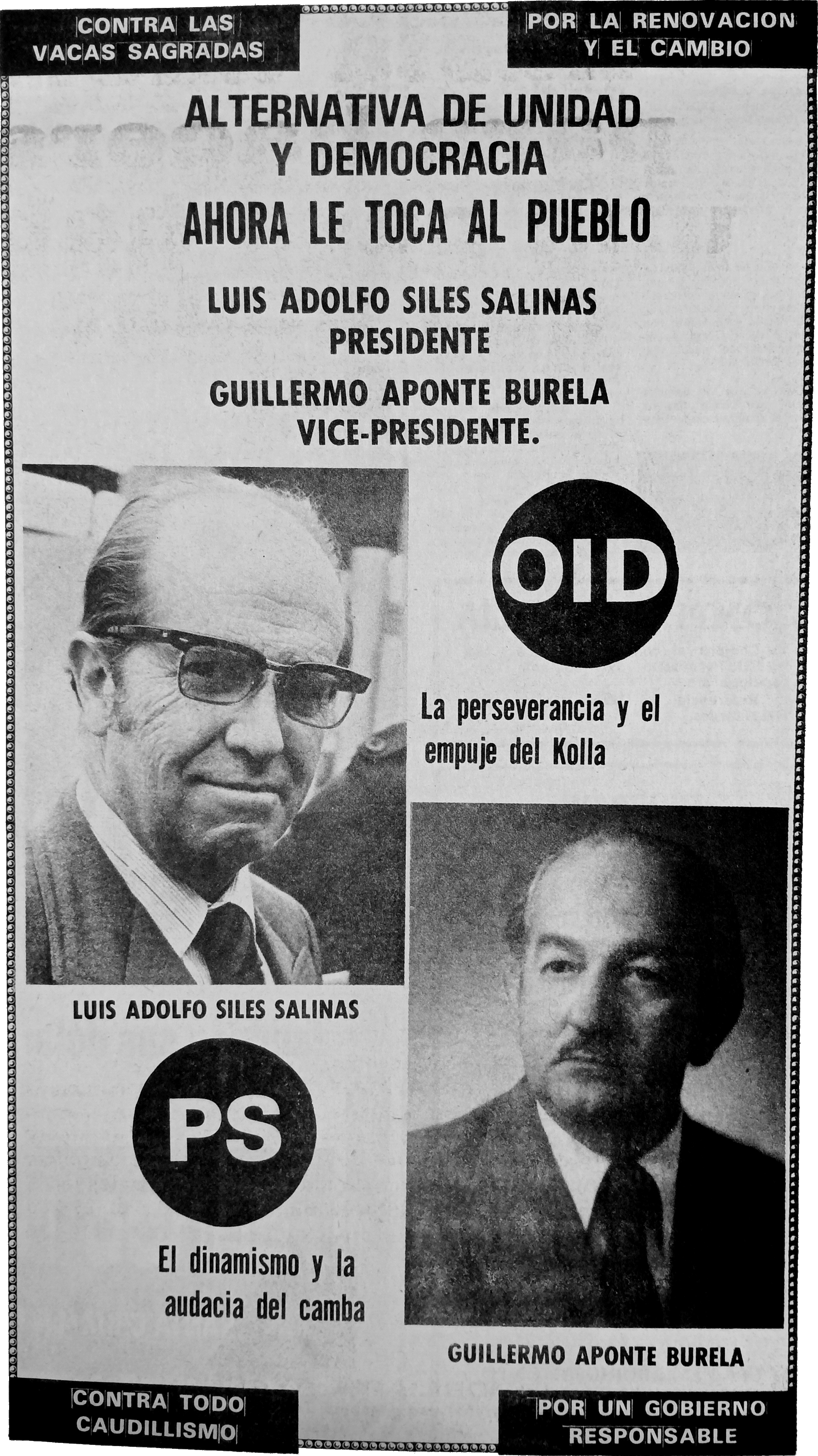
Political advertisement for the Siles and Aponte campaign, 11 February 1979. (Note: The poster highlights the "perseverance and drive of the colla" and the "dynamism and audacity of the camba", an allusion to Siles and Aponte's western and eastern origins, respectively.)

Into the new year, Siles and Aponte emerged as the main rival ticket to that of Siles Zuazo and Jaime Paz Zamora, backed by the alliance's largest parties. Their competing candidacies triggered a broader schism between the small parties and the core three members of the UDP. Siles's party criticized the top-down imposition of his half-brother's candidacy, and suggested a US-style primary election and nominating convention to resolve the dispute – a solution rejected by the large parties. By 27 January 1979, the UDP was in crisis, as the blanket opposition of the MRTK, OID, and PS to the candidacy of Siles Zuazo and Paz Zamora resulted in the estrangement of those parties from the alliance. Three days later, on 30 January, OID was expelled from the UDP, leading both the MRTK and PS to abandon the coalition as well.

=== Formation ===
Following their rupture with the UDP alliance, OID and the PS continued to campaign for Siles and Aponte. (Note: Despite previous support, the MRTK did not back their independent candidature.) On 2 March, the PS leader called on parties from across the political spectrum to coalesce into a single broad front of the center left, capable of challenging the "fascist right and refractory far-left". To that end, the two aligned parties held conversations with several political fronts, including the MRTK, the Christian Democratic Party, and the Social Democratic Party (PSD). In late March, OID and the PS entered talks with a dissident faction of the MNRI led by Jorge Alderete aimed at "rebuild[ing] the UDP" around the candidacy of Siles. Throughout April, the Siles–Aponte ticket continued to accumulate the support of various left-wing organizations. On 11 April, Clemente Ramos stated that negotiations were advancing steadily for the formation of an electoral alliance between the MNRI, MRTK, OID, PS, and the Revolutionary Party of the Nationalist Left (PRIN) of labor leader Juan Lechín. (Note: Further initiatives to incorporate the Communist Vanguard of the Revolutionary Workers' Party, the Revolutionary Party of the Workers of Bolivia, or the Socialist Party – 1 fell through, as all three considered OID too right-wing.) By 14 April, OID spokesperson Reynaldo Venegas indicated that an alliance between these center-left to left-wing parties was near fruition.

Right as the front neared inception, the agreement was upended by the entry into the race of former president and dictator Hugo Banzer on 18 April. In response to the announcement, OID immediately scuttled plans for an independent front and began urgent discussions to rejoin the UDP, as did the PS and MRTK. For Mario Reyes, representative of OID, the reunification of the left was the "logical response" to the threat of Banzer's "fascist candidacy" and the return of his authoritarian regime. However, negotiations for OID's reincorporation were hampered by the admission – also on 18 April – of former president Alfredo Ovando into UDP leadership. (Note: Siles's brief five-month stint as president in 1969 had been terminated when Ovando overthrew him in a coup d'état.) "I am not having, nor will I have conversations with Ovando", sustained Siles. OID and aligned parties contemplated reuniting with the UDP up until the final hour. In the end, the fronts determined to stay the course for the time being and remain separate. On 20 April, March for Left-wing Social Advancement (MASI), an alliance between the MNRI, OID, PS, and PSD, registered with the National Electoral Court; the tentative nominees were Siles for president and Aponte for vice president.

=== Dissolution and aftermath ===
In the ensuing days, MASI sought to broaden its membership through the incorporation of left-wing parties like the PRIN as well as campesino groups affiliated with Barrientism. Besides Aponte, the names of Ñuflo Chávez and Luis Zurita were put forward by the MNRI and barrientistas, respectively, as possible running mates for Siles. The possibility of rejoining the UDP was not entirely discarded either, in the event that MASI did not prove to be a "serious independent option", according to Venegas. By 28 April, the alliance was "still negotiating", leading representatives to deny rumors that MASI was on the verge of dissolution. Two days later, Siles and Aponte were officially proclaimed as MASI's nominees at a PS assembly in Trinidad. However, on 2 May, the day the campaign was intended to begin in earnest, Siles withdrew from the race, citing the financial difficulties of mounting a viable candidacy.

Shortly thereafter, both OID and the PS departed the alliance. According to Aponte, the front was dissolved the same day by resolution of its member parties. Despite this, on the same day as Siles's withdrawal, MASI confirmed its participation to the Electoral Court, and was assigned a position on the ballot with lilac as its color. Representatives Antonio Chiquié and Julio Valenzuela of the PSD also signed an agreement on behalf of the alliance to reimburse the government a share of expenses for its inclusion on the ballot if it did not attain at least 50,000 votes. In a statement to reporters, Chiquié declared that the PSD "believes in MASI and the need for a third option", and that it intended to maintain the alliance alongside the MNRI. For his part, Alderete asserted that there was still time to nominate a new ticket. In response, the PS stated that the decision to continue the alliance had been made "unilaterally" and that the party had "nothing to do with the new MASI". In a memorandum to the Electoral Court, OID authorized the alliance to continue using the MASI acronym, colors, and symbols – but not Siles's own likeness – to campaign.

In an effort to recover its viability, the alliance attempted to incorporate other parties. To that end, MASI once again reached out to the PRIN seeking its accession and support for a ticket led by Chávez and Chiquié. Lechín counteroffered and conditioned the PRIN's support on the inclusion of its own Armando Morales as Chávez's running mate instead. The effort to salvage MASI proved futile; by mid-May, the PRIN was solely in negotiations with the UDP, leaving the diminished alliance on its last legs. The MNRI of Alderete gave up the pretense on 16 May and left MASI to back the better-positioned alliance of Víctor Paz Estenssoro. MASI was officially dissolved and withdrawn from the ballot on 17 May. The National Electoral Court dismissed on 23 May a last-ditch attempt by the PSD to keep MASI on the ballot, ruling that the party had submitted the request too late.

== Member parties ==
Political party		Leader	Position
OID	Offensive of the Democratic Left	Luis Adolfo Siles	Center-left
PS	Socialist Party	Guillermo Aponte	Left-wing
MNRI	Left-wing Revolutionary Nationalist Movement	Jorge Alderete	Center-left
PSD	Social Democratic Party	Antonio Chiquié	Center-left
Source: Ó Maoláin 1985, pp. 21–23, 27–28.

== See also ==
- Democratic Revolutionary Front – New Alternative
