= 1966 Bolivian general election =

General elections were held in Bolivia on 3 July 1966. René Barrientos of the Front of the Bolivian Revolution (FRB) was elected president with 67% of the vote, whilst the FRB won a majority in both houses of Congress. James Dunkerley describes the election as not free and fair since a major segment of the opposition was excluded from participating. The United States government provided covert financial support to back Barrientos and to dissuade opposition parties from boycotting the vote.

== Background ==
Following the 1964 elections, Barrientos had led a military coup to remove Víctor Paz Estenssoro from power. In May 1965, Juan Lechín Oquendo, a labor leader who was the head of the left faction of the Nationalist Revolutionary Movement, was arrested and expelled from the country.

== Foreign involvement ==
The United States government conducted a covert "Political Action Program" in support of Barrientos' plan for elections. The Special Group of the National Security Council, then known as the 303 Committee, recommended backing Barrientos in July 1965 and March 1966. This backing included payments to Barrientos' emerging coalition and to factions of the Revolutionary National Movement that participated in elections. While the electoral results—a Barrientos victory—were coming in, an NSC memorandum summarized that,

The objectives of this program have been accomplished. A new political party was built to provide the platform for General Barrientos. This base was reinforced by a coalition of already existing parties. Despite many internal stresses, this pro-Barrientos complex was held together during the crucial pre-electoral period by [1½ lines of source text not declassified] covert financial support. At the same time covert financial assistance was given to [redacted] a rival party to ensure its participation in the elections. In addition, a [redacted] subsidy payment was made to [redacted] a second important opposition party which was considering withdrawing from the electoral process. [...] The combination of providing money and covert guidance to [redacted] contending parties changed the political climate from a volatile, conspiratorial atmosphere with little discussion of peaceful resolution through elections to a full fledged electoral atmosphere with the traditional violence and conspiracy thrust into the background.

== Campaign ==
Several alliances were formed for the elections:

Alliance	Parties
Christian Democratic Community	Bolivian Socialist Falange
Christian Democratic Community	Democratic Revolutionary Alliance
Christian Democratic Community	National Association of Democratic Professions
Democratic Institutionalist Alliance	Liberal Party
Democratic Institutionalist Alliance	Republican Socialist Unity Party
Front of the Bolivian Revolution	Authentic Revolutionary Party
Front of the Bolivian Revolution	Popular Christian Movement
Front of the Bolivian Revolution	Social Democratic Party
Front of the Bolivian Revolution	Revolutionary Left Party
Liberation Front of the National Left	Communist Party and others

== Results ==
Party	Presidential candidate	Votes	%	Seats	
Party	Presidential candidate	Votes	%	Chamber	Senate
Front of the Bolivian Revolution	René Barrientos	677,805	67.14	82	18
Christian Democratic Community	Bernardino Bilbao Rioja	138,001	13.67	19	8
Revolutionary Nationalist Movement–Andrade	Víctor Andrade	88,392	8.76	0	0
Revolutionary Nationalist Movement of the People	Mario Díez de Medina	60,505	5.99	1	1
Liberation Front of the National Left	Felipe Iñíguez	33,458	3.31	0	0
Democratic Institutionalist Alliance	Enrique Hertzog	11,330	1.12	0	0
Total		1,009,491	100.00	102	27
Valid votes		1,009,491	91.77		
Invalid/blank votes		90,503	8.23		
Total votes		1,099,994	100.00		
Registered voters/turnout		1,270,611	86.57		
Source: Hofmeister & Bamberger

== See also ==
- Bolivian National Congress, 1966–1969
