= Héctor Borda =

Bolivian politician, anthropologist, and poet (1927–2022)

Hector A. Borda Leaño
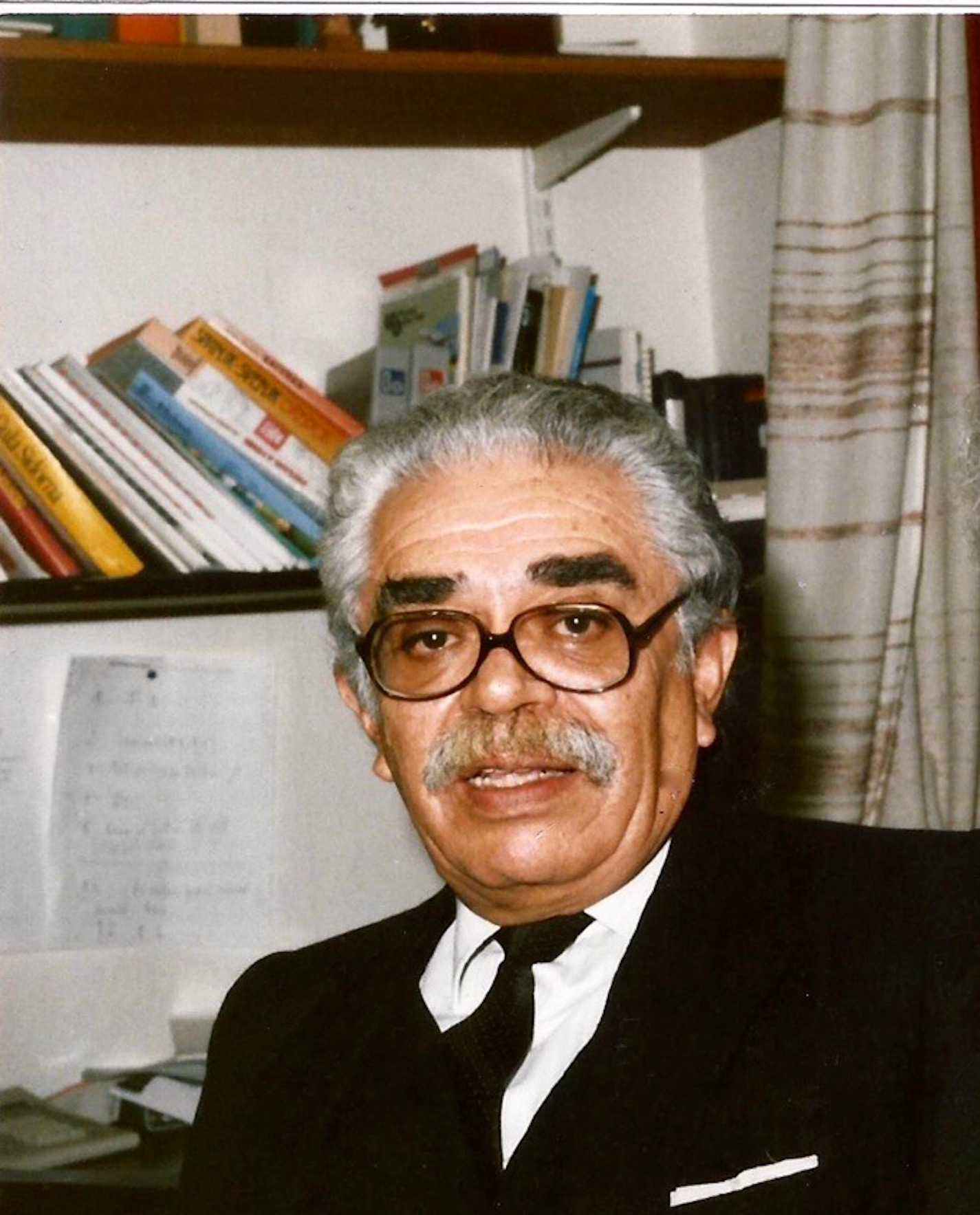
- Born: 1927; Oruro, Bolivia
- Died: 25 January 2022 (aged 94–95); Sweden
- Education: National University of La Plata
- Occupations: Writer, politician, anthropologist
- Title: Senator
- Term: 1982 – 1985
- Political party: Falange Socialista Bolivia (FSB)

Héctor Borda Leaño (1927 – 25 January 2022) was a Bolivian politician, anthropologist and poet. He was born into an intellectual family as son of a farmacologist from Potosí and a lady of landowner gentry from Sucre. His father and two uncles fought in the Chaco war, and much of his childhood was marked by difficulties. Borda joined the Falange Socialista Boliviana (FSB), as a teenager in the early 1940s. Eventually he was elected for this party to the national congress 1966-1969. In the early 1970s he broke out from the FSB together with Marcelo Quiroga Santa Cruz and Walter Vasquez Michel. After the military coup led by Hugo Banzer in 1971 Borda was forced into exile, first to Argentina and again in 1977 to Sweden. He returned to Bolivia in 1982 as elected senator for the newly formed Partido Socialista (PS-1).

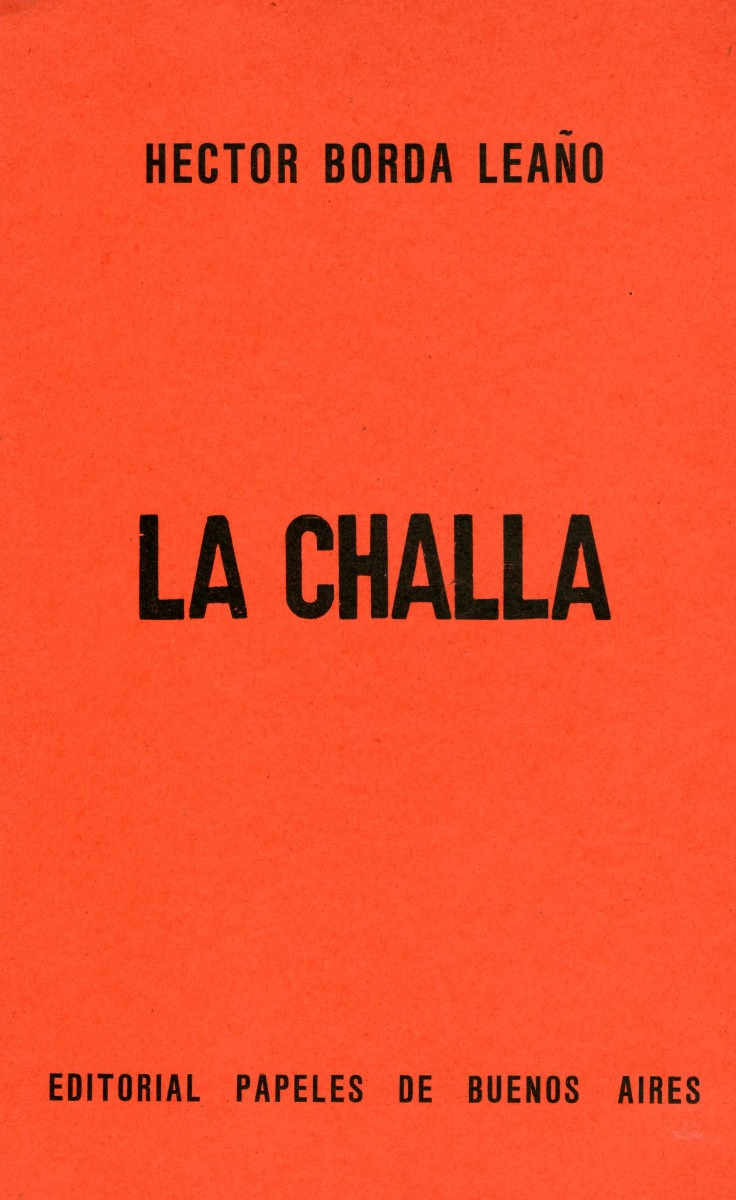
La Challa (1965), by Hector Borda Leaño

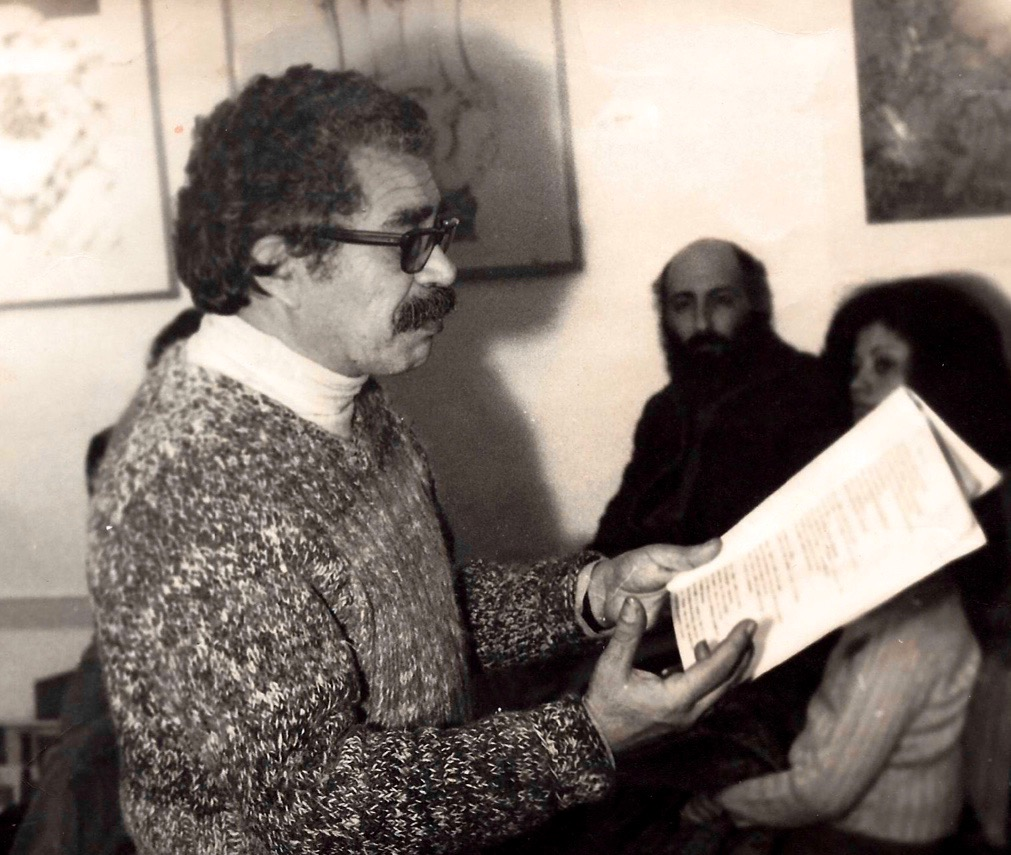
Borda Leaño reading poetry at an art gallery in Buenos Aires in 1971.

Borda Leaño was a member of several avantgarde artistic movements in Bolivia, such as the Second Gésta Bárbara in Oruro and Grupo Anteo in Sucre. During the 1960s Borda Leaño was a founding member of the cultural movement Prisma, which gathered the Bolivian intellectual elite. Its leading members, among them Pedro Shimose, Julio de La Vega and Monsignor Juan Quiróz, were closely connected to the newspaper El Diario and were key in extending Bolivian literary influence across its national borders. Borda became in the late 1960s gradually more left-wing and turned ideologically towards a nationalist marxist vision that sought to galvanize the mining proletariat with the indigenous pesantry. His literary style reflected his ideals, as he mixed indigenous – particularly Quechua – cultural and linguistic symbolism with an often brutal social realism. His poems are epics of the dispossessed, and deals with the lives of miners, street vendors, drunks and prostitutes. Borda Leaño himself explained: "Before writing an exquisite poem on a trivial subject, it is preferable to write, even imperfectly, a poetry that deals with man and his dramatic and painful circumstances."

Borda Leaño was the author of several poemaries and was twice awarded the Franz Tamayo national award for his books La Challa (1965) and Con Rabiosa Alegría (1970). In 2010 he was awarded the Bolivian national cultural award "Marina Núñez del Prado" by the ministry of culture of the Bolivian plurinational state.

He died in Sweden on 25 January 2022.

== Literary works ==
- 1965 La Ch'alla. Buenos Aires: Editorial Papeles de Buenos Aires.
- 1966 El sapo y la serpiente. Oruro: Universidad técnica de Oruro.
- 1970 Con rabiosa alegría. La Paz: Municipalidad de La Paz.
- 1972 En esta oscura tierra, with original engravings by Ricardo Carpani. Buenos Aires: Ediciones Dead Weight/Editorial Losada.
- 1997 Poemas desbandados. La Paz: Plural editores.
- 1998 Las claves del comandante. La Paz: Plural editores.
- 2013 Poemas para una mujer de noviembre. Tromsø: Series de E-poesías "Mariposa".
- 2018 Kommandantens kodeord. Danish edition, translated by Steen Johansen. Copenhagen.

== Miscellaneous ==
- His great-grandfather on his mother's side was the 19th century banker and silver baron Jacobo Aillón.
- Hector Borda was one of the youngest persons to be interned in the notorious political concentration camp on the Lake Titicaca isle of Coati in 1947.
- In the 1950s Borda ran a local radio station in Oruro, transmitting mainly cultural and educational content to the working population of the Huanuni mines.
- His wife was Elisabeth "Betty" Oviedo Avila.
