= Workers' Socialist Movement (Bolivia) =

Political party in Bolivia

The Workers' Socialist Movement (Spanish: Movimiento Socialista de los Trabajadores, abbreviated MST), known for many years as the Workers' Socialist Party (Partido Socialista de los Trabajadores, abbreviated PST), is a Trotskyist political party in Bolivia. PST/MST was affiliated to LIT-CI for a long period.

== Origins ==
PST emerged from a Morenoist fraction of the Socialist Party-1 of Marcelo Quiroga Santa Cruz in the late 1970s. Quiroga Santa Cruz had developed contacts with Trotskyists during his exile in Argentina, and invited Trotskyists to join his party. The PST was established, and legally recognized, as the Workers' Socialist Organization (Organización Socialista de los Trabajadores, OST) in 1980. The organization published El Chasqui (later renamed Chasqui Socialista).

== 1980s ==
In 1984 the PST had several delegates present at the sixth congress of Central Obrera Boliviana (COB), including factory workers from La Paz and teachers from Oruro.

PST held a party congress in the beginning of 1985, with 380 delegates.

When COB launched a general strike in March 1985, which was to last for 20 days, PST raised the slogan "All power to COB!".

== Later developments ==
MST appealed for blank votes in the 2010 local and regional elections.

== Leadership ==
Pablo Solón Romero was the main leader of PST during the 1980s. Other members of the party Executive Committee in the early 1980s were Amalia Pando Vega, Hernán Vilela Diez de Medina, Jaime Vilela Gutiérrez and Jorge de la Zerda Gueti. Whilst Solón (later the Ambassador of Bolivia to the United Nations) is no longer affiliated with the organization, Jaime Vilela Gutiérrez remains in the leadership of MST.

== Youth wing ==
MST has a youth wing, Socialist Youth (Juventud Socialista).
