= Alliance of the National Left =

Former political party in Bolivia

- Abbreviation: ALIN
- Founder: Juan José Torres; Rubén Sánchez Valdivia
- Founded: 1973
- Dissolved: 1980
- Labour wing: COB
- Peasant wing: CNTCB
- Ideology: Socialism; Trade unionism Labourism; Agrarianism
- Political position: Left-wing
- National affiliation: UD (1978-1979); FDR-NA (1980)

The Alliance of the National Left (Spanish: Alianza de la Izquierda Nacional, ALIN) was a left-wing political party in Bolivia.

It was founded in May 1973 by ex-President General Juan José Torres and Major Rubén Sánchez Valdivia.

In an effort to reintegrate the Bolivian resistance with the concrete struggles of the Bolivian masses, Torres and Sánchez Valdivia, with the support of the Bolivian Workers' Center, organized the ALIN as a new movement of national resistance patterned on the Argentine experience. With its headquarters in Buenos Aires, the ALIN reached an agreement in January 1974 with the powerful National Confederation of Peasant Workers of Bolivia (CNTCB). The ALIN promised to give the peasants a greater role in the management of Bolivia's economic and political affairs, in return for peasant support of the ALIN's program of national liberation and peasant recognition of Juan José Torres as the supreme conductor of the Bolivian resistance.

It consisted of a small group of revolutionary militants and had the backing of the organization of young Bolivian army officers in exile.

In 1978 and 1979, the Alliance of the National Left took part in an electoral coalition Democratic and Popular Union backing Hernán Siles Zuazo.

For the 1980 elections, the ALIN was the component of the Democratic Revolutionary Front-New Alternative, with Luis Adolfo Siles Salinas as the coalition's presidential candidate.

After the coup d'état on 17 July 1980, the Alliance of the National Left disappeared.
