= Front of the Bolivian Revolution =

Alliance of political parties in Bolivia

The Front of the Bolivian Revolution (Spanish: Frente de la Revolución Boliviana, FRB) was an electoral political alliance built as an electoral vehicle for René Barrientos Ortuño, who seized power in a military coup on November 4, 1964. It was an alliance of:

- The Popular Christian Movement, MPC;
- The Social Democratic Party, PSD;
- The Revolutionary Left Party, PIR;
- The Authentic Revolutionary Party, PRA.
- and a Peasant Bloc of rural leaders unaffiliated with any of these parties.

James Malloy describes the parties involvement as self-interested: "its reason for being was the desire of these little bands of politicians to ride into office on Barrientos' coattails."

The Front of the Bolivian Revolution was established in 1965, for the 1966 presidential and congressional elections. It presented as its presidential candidate René Barrientos Ortuño (independent) and Luis Adolfo Siles Salinas (PSD), as vice-presidential candidate. The Front won 67% of the vote in the 1966 election, which provided a mandate for Barrientos become a nominally civilian president. Independent of the FRB, Barrientos had influence with numerous peasant leaders in Bolivia. Rather than join the front, they decided to organize as a Peasant Bloc ("bloque campesino"). The vast majority of FRB votes in 1966 came from outside the cities: 105,369 of its 677,805 votes were in urban areas.

Military coups in 1969 and 1971 prevented any further elections until 1978, and the FRB did not participate further in Bolivian politics afterwards.
