= Workers' Socialist Movement =

Workers' Socialist Movement or Socialist Workers' Movement may refer to:

- Workers' Socialist Movement (Argentina)
- Workers' Socialist Movement (Bolivia)
- Socialist Workers' Movement (Ireland)
- Socialist Workers Movement (Mexico)
- Socialist Workers Movement (Nigeria)
- Workers' Socialist Movement (Puerto Rico)
