= 1956 presidential election =

1956 presidential election may refer to:

- 1956 Bolivian presidential election
- 1956 Salvadoran presidential election
- 1956 Finnish presidential election
- 1956 Icelandic presidential election
- 1956 South Korean presidential election
- 1956 United States presidential election
