= Ayllon (surname) =

Ayllón is a surname. Notable people with the surname include:

- Eva Ayllón, Peruvian composer and singer
- Julio Ayllón, Peruvian footballer
- Julio Garrett Ayllón
- Lucas Vázquez de Ayllón (1475–1526), Spanish explorer of North America
- Luis López de la Torre Ayllón y Kirsmacker, Spanish nobleman
- Marcelino Pérez Ayllón
- Rafaela Porras Ayllón, Spanish nun
- Solomon Ayllon (1664–1728), haham of the Sephardic congregations in London and Amsterdam
- Valentín Abecia Ayllón

== See also ==
- Aillón
