= Movimiento Socialista de los Trabajadores =

Movimiento Socialista de los Trabajadores can refer to:

- Workers' Socialist Movement (Argentina)
- Workers' Socialist Movement (Bolivia)
- Workers' Socialist Movement (Puerto Rico)
