= Revolutionary Workers' Party (Trotskyist–Posadist) =

Bolivian political party founded in 1963

The Revolutionary Workers' Party Trotskyist–Posadist (Spanish: Partido Obrero Revolucionario Trotskista Posadista, POR-TP) was a small Trotskyist political party in Bolivia formed in 1963. It was established by a dissident group which broke away from the Revolutionary Workers' Party of Bolivia. It was led by workers' leader Carlos Flores Bedregal.

In 1978 and 1979, the POR-TP took part in an electoral coalition, the Democratic and Popular Union, backing Hernán Siles Zuazo.

For the 1980 elections, the POR-TP was the component of the Democratic Revolutionary Front-New Alternative, with the OID's leader Luis Adolfo Siles Salinas as the coalition's presidential candidate.

In 1985, it took part in an electoral coalition, the United Left, backing Isaac Sandóval Rodríguez.
