= Workers' Socialist Organization =

The Workers' Socialist Organization (Spanish: Organización Socialista de los Trabajadores, OST) was a small Trotskyist political party in Bolivia.

The Workers' Socialist Organization was established by a dissident fraction which broke away from the Communist Vanguard of the Revolutionary Workers' Party in 1978. It was led by Sonia Montafto.

In 1979 the OST allied with the Socialist Party-One and its candidate Marcelo Quiroga Santa Cruz.

In 1980 the OST allied with the Revolutionary Party of the Nationalist Left and its candidate Juan Lechín Oquendo.
