= Unified Trade Union Confederation of Peasant Workers of Bolivia =

Bolivian trade union

CSUTCB
- Confederación Sindical Única de Trabajadores Campesinos de Bolivia
- Founded: 1979
- Headquarters: La Paz, Bolivia
- Location: Bolivia
- Affiliations: COB

The Unified Trade Union Confederation of Peasant Workers of Bolivia (Spanish: Confederación Sindical Única de Trabajadores Campesinos de Bolivia; CSUTCB) is the largest peasant union confederation in Bolivia.

The CSUTCB was formed in 1979 in opposition to government-sponsored peasant unions, and immediately replaced the National Confederation of Peasant Workers of Bolivia. Under the leadership of the Túpac Katari Revolutionary Movement, the CSUTCB became an independent organization. The CSUTCB became involved in the Bolivian Workers' Center labor federation and (because of the decline of the miners' federation) became a leading force in the COB. Through the CSUTCB's pressure, the COB moved beyond a purely class-based focus to address indigenous demands, as well.

During the 1990s the CSUTCB moved beyond its support base of Aymara-speaking indigenous people, bringing Guaraní- and Quechua-speaking indigenous into its ranks. The CSUTCB played a significant role in the series of demonstrations that brought down President Carlos Mesa in 2005. The CSUTCB has supported nationalisation of Bolivia's natural gas reserves and opposed water privatization. The CSUTCB was a founding member of the Pact of Unity supporting the Evo Morales government.
