= María Cristina Trigo =

Bolivian writer and human rights activist

- Born: María Cristina Trigo Viaña; 1935; La Paz, Bolivia
- Died: 30 December 2014 (aged 79); La Paz, Bolivia
- Occupation: Writer
- Spouse: Marcelo Quiroga Santa Cruz (m. 1954; died 1980)

María Cristina Trigo Viaña (1935 – 30 December 2014) was a Bolivian writer and human rights activist. She was married to the politician Marcelo Quiroga Santa Cruz, who was assassinated in 1980.

== Early life ==
María Cristina Trigo was born in La Paz in 1935. She began her education in 1941, completing her baccalaureate in her hometown in 1952.

In 1954, at age 19, María Cristina married Marcelo Quiroga Santa Cruz, who years later would become one of Bolivia's most prominent political personalities. She gave birth to their daughter María Soledad in Santiago in 1957, and to their son Pablo Rodrigo in Salta in 1959.

== Activism and writing ==
On 17 July 1980, Trigo's husband Marcelo, then a deputy in the Bolivian National Congress, was detained, tortured, killed, and disappeared by the government of General Luis García Meza and his minister of the interior, Luis Arce Gómez.

Six years later, on 7 April 1986, during the fourth government of President Víctor Paz Estenssoro, a trial of responsibilities was opened against García Meza and his closest collaborators during the period of military dictatorship in Bolivia. Trigo filed suit and was admitted as a civil party to the proceedings. The final verdict was rendered on 21 April 1993, during the government of Jaime Paz Zamora, with García Meza being sentenced to 30 years in prison without the right to pardon. Arce Gómez was also sentenced to 30 years, Waldo Bernal Pereira to five years, and Armando Reyes Villa (father of politician Manfred Reyes Villa) to two years. At the time of the decision, García Meza was a fugitive from justice.

In March 1994, García Meza was arrested in São Paulo by the federal police of Brazil. His extradition to Bolivia would last an entire year. In March 1995, he was flown to El Alto to begin serving his 30-year sentence in the maximum security prison at Chonchocoro. He died in a military hospital in April 2018. In a posthumous letter, he denied responsibility for Marcelo Quiroga's death, and blamed many of his regime's crimes on Arce Gómez.

In 2006, Trigo released a novel entitled Las Muertes de Gabriel (ISBN 9789995410285), which continued a narrative her husband had begun in his poems. In 2010, during the second government of President Evo Morales, Trigo filed a lawsuit before the Inter-American Commission on Human Rights (IACHR) against the Bolivian government due to its lack of willingness to find her husband's remains.

Years later, Trigo also opposed the enactment of an anti-corruption law bearing her husband's name.

== Death ==
María Cristina Trigo died in La Paz on 30 December 2014 at age 79. Marcelo Quiroga's remains were never recovered.

== See also ==
- 1980 Bolivian coup d'état
- Operation Condor
