= Communist Vanguard of the Revolutionary Workers' Party =

Defunct political party in Bolivia

The Communist Vanguard of the Revolutionary Workers' Party (Spanish: Vanguardia Comunista del Partido Obrero Revolucionario, VCPOR) was a small Trotskyist political party in Bolivia.

The Communist Vanguard of the Revolutionary Workers' Party was established in 1977 by a dissident group which broke away from the Revolutionary Workers' Party in 1975. Led by workers' leader Filemón Escóbar and Víctor Sossa.

In 1978 the VCPOR took part in an electoral coalition Revolutionary Left Front backing Casiano Amurrio Rocha.

The Communist Vanguard of the Revolutionary Workers' Party divided into three groups in 1978, two sections breaking away to form the Workers' Vanguard Party and the Workers' Socialist Organization.

In 1979 the VCPOR allied with the Socialist Party-One and its candidate Marcelo Quiroga Santa Cruz. In 1980 the VCPOR allied with the Revolutionary Party of the Nationalist Left and its candidate Juan Lechín Oquendo.
