= Liberation Front of the National Left =

The Liberation Front of the National Left (Spanish: Frente de Liberación de Izquierda Nacional, FLIN) was organized in 1964 by Communist Party of Bolivia (PCB) in opposition to Víctor Paz Estenssoro's bid for a third term. The FLIN has opposed the junta of René Barrientos Ortuño and the United States.

The Liberation Front of the National Left was reestablished in 1966, for the 1966 presidential and congressional elections. It presented as its presidential candidate Felipe Iñíguez Medrano (PCB) and Mario Miranda Pacheco (PCB), as vice-presidential candidate.
