= Óscar Únzaga =

Bolivian falangist political leader

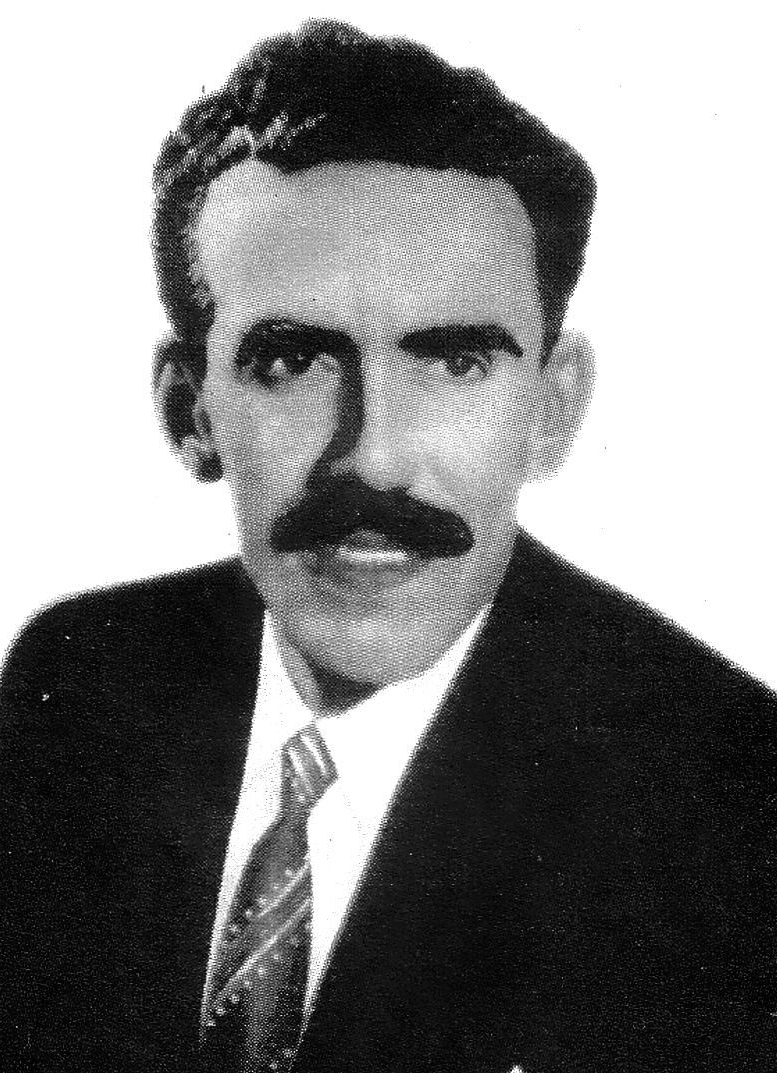

Leader of the Bolivian Socialist Falange
- In office 15 August 1945 – 19 April 1959
- Preceded by: Himself (as general secretary)
- Succeeded by: Mario Gutiérrez

General Secretary of the Bolivian Socialist Falange
- In office 15 August 1937 – 15 August 1945
- Preceded by: Office established
- Succeeded by: Himself (as party leader)

Personal details
- Born: Óscar Únzaga de la Vega; 19 April 1916 Cochabamba, Bolivia
- Died: 19 April 1959 (aged 43) La Paz, Bolivia
- Cause of death: Suicide
- Party: Bolivian Socialist Falange

Óscar Únzaga de la Vega (19 April 1916 – 19 April 1959) was a Bolivian political figure and rebel. Most significantly, he founded the Bolivian Socialist Falange (FSB) movement in 1937, and ran for President in the 1956 elections, when his party became the main opposition movement to the Movimiento Nacionalista Revolucionario (MNR).

In 1959, Únzaga was one of fifty people who died during an attempted coup by the FSB. Government forces reported that he killed himself, but supporters disputed the official account and claimed that he was assassinated.

Party political offices
Preceded by New political party	General Secretary of the Bolivian Socialist Falange; 1937–1945	Succeeded by Himself as Leader of the Party
Preceded by Himself as General Secretary	Leader of the Bolivian Socialist Falange; 1945–1959	Succeeded by Mario Gutiérrez
Preceded by Bernardino Bilbao Rioja	Bolivian Socialist Falange nominee for President of Bolivia; 1956	Succeeded by Mario Gutiérrez
