= 1956 Bolivian general election =

- 17 June 1956
- Presidential election
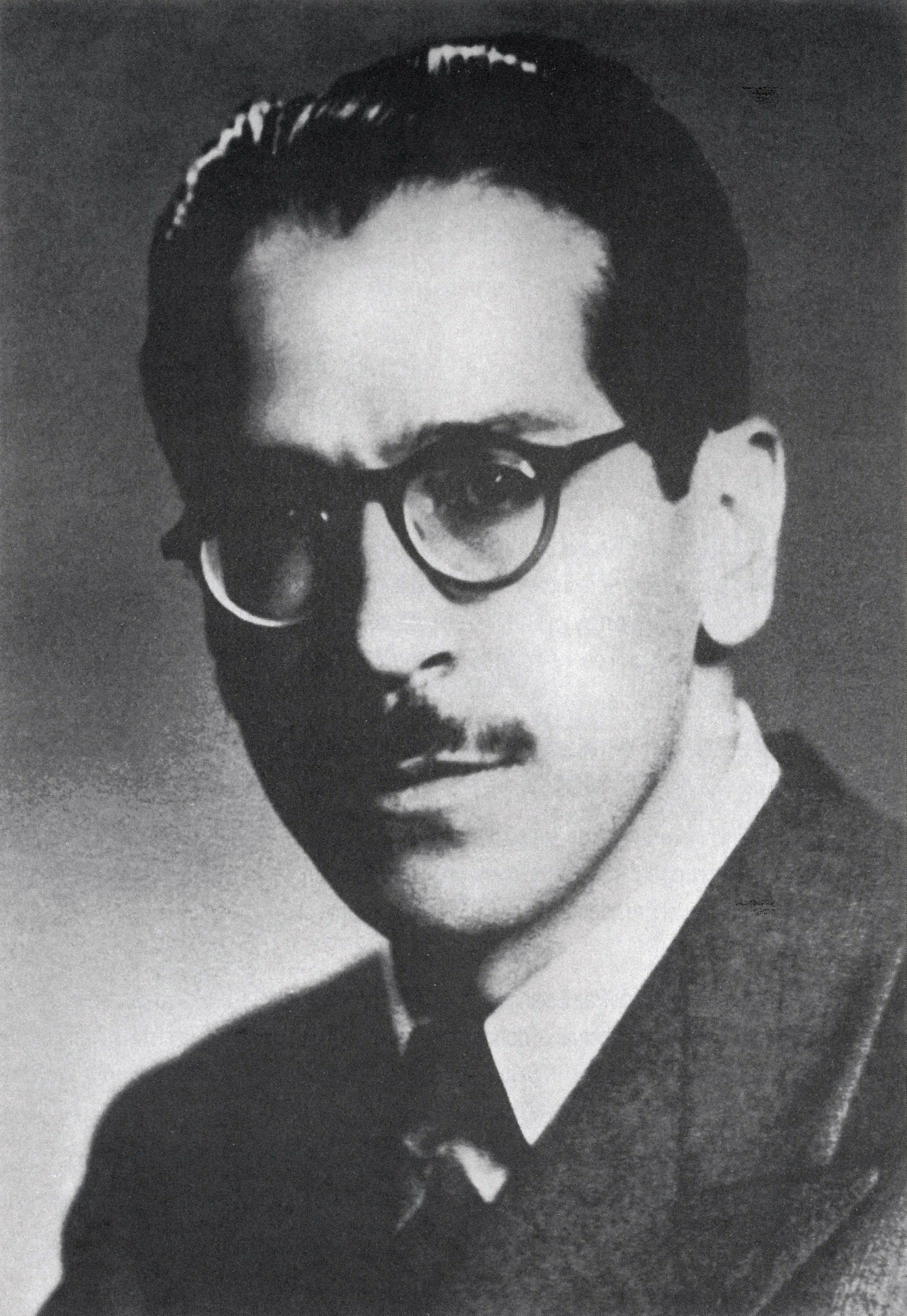

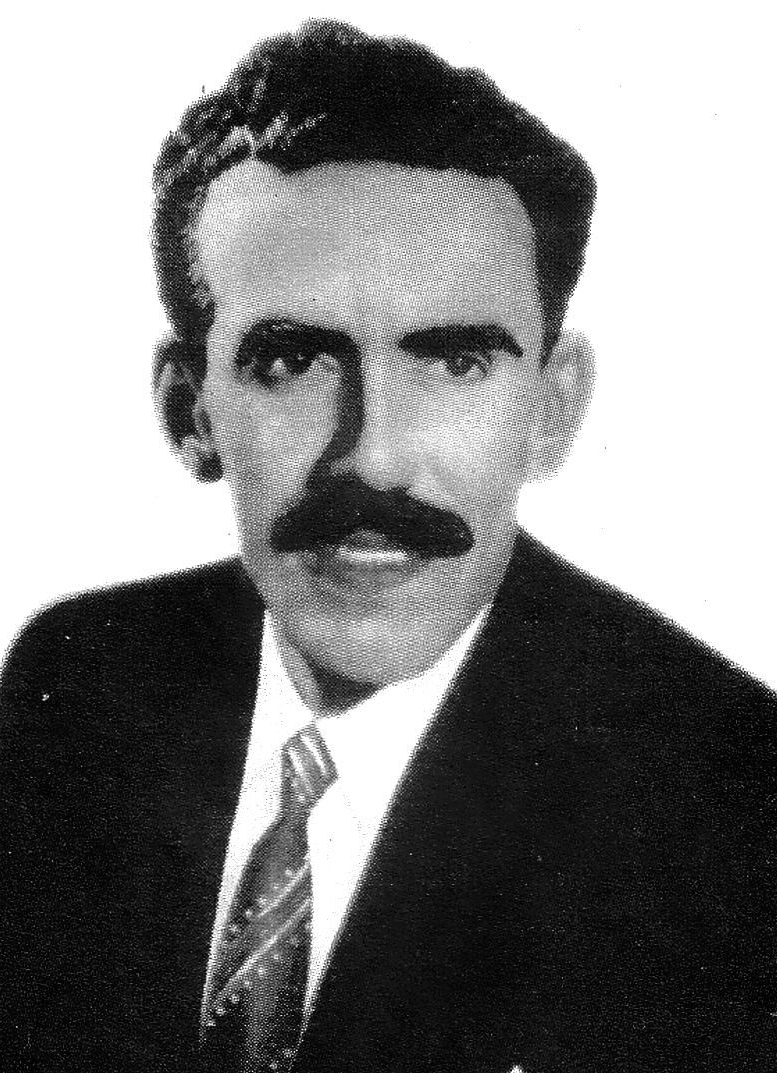
Nominee	Hernán Siles Zuazo	Óscar Únzaga
Party	MNR	FSB
Running mate	Ñuflo Chávez Ortiz	Mario Gutiérrez Gutiérrez
Popular vote	787,792	130,494
Percentage	84.45%	13.99%
President before election
Víctor Paz Estenssoro
MNR
Elected President
Hernán Siles Zuazo
MNR

General elections were held in Bolivia on 17 June 1956. Hernán Siles Zuazo of the Revolutionary Nationalist Movement (MNR) was elected president with 84% of the vote, whilst the MNR won 61 of the 68 seats in the Chamber of Deputies and all 18 seats in the Senate.

== Results ==
Party	Presidential candidate	Votes	%	Seats	
Party	Presidential candidate	Votes	%	Chamber	Senate
Revolutionary Nationalist Movement	Hernán Siles Zuazo	787,792	84.45	61	18
Bolivian Socialist Falange	Óscar Únzaga	130,494	13.99	7	0
Communist Party	Felipe Iñíguez Medrano	12,273	1.32	0	0
Revolutionary Workers' Party	Hugo Gonzales Moscoso	2,329	0.25	0	0
Total		932,888	100.00	68	18
Valid votes		932,888	97.34		
Invalid/blank votes		25,532	2.66		
Total votes		958,420	100.00		
Registered voters/turnout		1,126,528	85.08		
Source: Nohlen
