= Revolutionary Workers' Party–Struggle =

- Founded: 1985
- Ideology: Trotskyist; Social democracy Indigenismo
- Political position: Left-wing

The Revolutionary Workers' Party–Struggle (Spanish: Partido Obrero Revolucionario-Combate, POR-C) was a small Trotskyist political party in Bolivia. The Revolutionary Workers' Party–Struggle was established in 1957 by a dissident group which broke away from the Revolutionary Workers' Party. Led by workers' leader Hugo Gonzáles Moscoso.

In 1980 the POR-C allied with the Revolutionary Party of the Nationalist Left and its candidate Juan Lechín Oquendo.

In 1984, the POR-C merged with the Workers' Vanguard Party to form the new Revolutionary Workers' Party-Unified.
