= United Left (Bolivia, 1985) =

IU ballot

The United Left (Spanish: Izquierda Unida, abbreviated IU) was a political coalition in Bolivia, launched ahead of the 1985 general election. IU was founded on February 22, 1985, by Isaac Sandoval Rodríguez, Federico Hurtado, and Pedro Monteciño. The United Left was composed of Eje de Convergencia, Revolutionary Workers Party Trotskyist-Posadist (POR Trotskista-Posadista), and other leftwing groups.

Isaac Sandoval Rodríguez was the presidential candidate of IU, and Luis Luján Ticona was the candidate for vice president. The Sandoval-Luján ticket obtained 10,892 votes (0.6% of the national vote). IU obtained 4,933 votes in La Paz Department, 1,598 in Santa Cruz Department, 1,382 in Potosí Department, 1,323 in Cochabamba Department, 661 in Chuquisaca Department, 519 in Oruro Department, 286 in Tarija Department, 171 in Beni Department and a mere 19 votes in Pando Department.
