= Revolutionary Workers' Party–Unified =

The Revolutionary Workers' Party–Unified (Spanish: Partido Obrero Revolucionario-Unificado, POR-U) was a small Trotskyist (left-wing socialist) political party formed in Bolivia in 1984 by the merging of the Revolutionary Workers' Party-Struggle (POR-C) and the Workers' Vanguard Party (VO).

In 1985 POR-U allied with the Revolutionary Liberation Movement Tupaq Katari and its candidate Jenaro Flores Santos.
