= National Left Movement =

The National Left Movement (Spanish: Movimiento de Izquierda Nacional; MIN) was a left-wing political party in Bolivia.

In 1978, Luis Sandoval Morón split from the Revolutionary Nationalist Movement and founded the National Left Movement. Sandoval Morón was a significant member of the MNR who ruled Santa Cruz Department during the 1950s.

The National Left Movement aims at being a political mass organization conducting "the struggle for national liberation from the imperialist yoke and for the building of a free and just society". It is hostile to "US imperialism" and Brazil's "expansionist sub-imperialism".

In 1978 and 1979 the National Left Movement took part in an electoral coalition Democratic and Popular Union backing Hernán Siles Zuazo. In 1980 it allied with the United Revolutionary Nationalist Movement and its candidate Guillermo Bedregal Gutiérrez.
