= Democratic Revolutionary Front – New Alternative =

Democratic Revolutionary Front - New Alternative
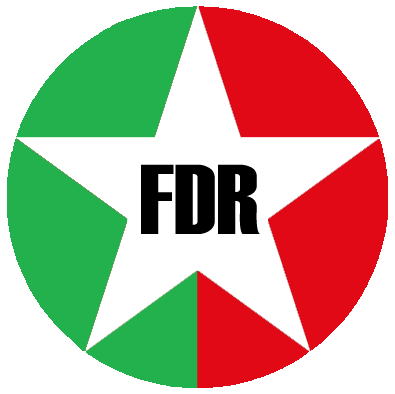
- Leader: Luis Adolfo Siles
- Founded: 1980
- Ideology: Big tent Factions: Christian democracy Socialism; Reformism; Posadism

The Democratic Revolutionary Front – New Alternative (Spanish: Frente Democrático Revolucionario – Nueva Alternativa, FDR-NA) was a right-centrist electoral political alliance in Bolivia.

The FDR-NA was formed in Spring 1980 by:

- Christian Democratic Party, PDC;
- Alliance of the National Left, ALIN;
- Socialist Party-Guillermo Aponte Burela, PS-Aponte;
- Offensive of the Democratic Left, OID;
- Revolutionary Workers Party Trotskyist-Posadist, POR-TP.

In the 1980 general elections the FDR-NA presented as its presidential candidate Luis Adolfo Siles Salinas (OID) and Benjamín Miguel Harb (PDC) as vice-presidential candidate.
