= Workers' Vanguard (political party) =

Small Trotskyist political party in Bolivia

The Workers' Vanguard (Spanish: Vanguardia Obrera; VO) was a small Trotskyist political party in Bolivia.

The Workers' Vanguard was established by a dissident fraction which broke away from the Communist Vanguard of the Revolutionary Workers' Party in 1978. It was led by Filemón Escóbar Escóbar and Ricardo Catoira Marín.

The VO took part in elections in 1979 and presented as its presidential candidate Ricardo Catoira Marín and Filemón Escobar as vice-presidential candidate.

In 1980 the VO took part in an electoral coalition Democratic and Popular Union backing Hernán Siles Zuazo.

In 1984, the Workers' Vanguard Party merged with the Revolutionary Workers' Party-Struggle to form the new Revolutionary Workers' Party-Unified.
