= Offensive of the Democratic Left =

The Offensive of the Democratic Left (Spanish: Ofensiva de Izquierda Democrática, OID) was a small reform-oriented centrist political party in Bolivia.

The Offensive of the Democratic Left was founded in 1978 by ex-President and former leader of the Social Democratic Party Luis Adolfo Siles Salinas (half-brother of Nationalist Revolutionary Movement of the Left leader Hernán Siles Zuazo).

In 1978, the Offensive of the Democratic Left took part in an electoral coalition Democratic and Popular Union backing Hernán Siles Zuazo.

For the 1980 elections, the Offensive of the Democratic Left was the component of the Democratic Revolutionary Front-New Alternative, with the OID's leader Luis Adolfo Siles Salinas as the coalition's presidential candidate.

After the coup d'état on 17 July 1980, the Offensive of the Democratic Left disappeared.
