= National Confederation of Peasant Workers of Bolivia =

CNTCB
- National Confederation of Peasant Workers of Bolivia
- Confederación Nacional de Trabajadores Campesinos de Bolivia
- Founded: 15 July 1953
- Dissolved: 1979
- Headquarters: La Paz, Bolivia
- Location: Bolivia
- Affiliations: COB

National Confederation of Peasant Workers of Bolivia (Spanish: Confederación Nacional de Trabajadores Campesinos de Bolivia, CNTCB) was the largest union of peasants in Bolivia from its founding in 1953 until it was superseded by the Unified Syndical Confederation of Rural Workers of Bolivia (CSUTCB) in 1979. The organization's first leaders were Executive Secretary Ñuflo Chávez and General Secretary Severo Oblitas, chosen in July 1954. Its highest decision-making body was the Congress; the First Congress was held in La Paz on 3 October 1954; the Second in Santa Cruz in 1963; the third in Ucureña in 1964; and the fourth in Tarabuco in 1967.
