= Alliance of Nationalist Left Forces of the MNR =

The Alliance of Nationalist Left Forces of the MNR (Spanish: Alianza de Fuerzas de la Izquierda Nacional del MNR, AFIN-MNR) was a leftist political party in Bolivia.

In 1980 the left-wing group split from the Revolutionary Nationalist Movement and founded the Alliance of Nationalist Left Forces of the MNR. Led by Roberto Jordán Pando.

In 1980 elections the AFIN-MNR presented Roberto Jordán Pando as presidential candidate; he won 1.31 per cent of the vote.

In 1984 the AFIN-MNR merged with the Leftwing Revolutionary Nationalist Movement (MNRI).

In 1985 elections the MNRI presented Roberto Jordán Pando as presidential candidate.
