= National Association of Democratic Professions =

1960s organisation in Bolivia

The National Association of Democratic Professions (Spanish: Asociación Nacional de Profesionales Demócratas, ANPD) was a small temporary organization in Bolivia. It was founded by Bolivian Socialist Falange in 1966 and took part in a FSB’s electoral coalition Christian Democratic Community.

After the coup d'état on 26 September 1969 the ANPD disappeared.
