= United Revolutionary Nationalist Movement =

The United Revolutionary Nationalist Movement (Spanish: Movimiento Nacionalista Revolucionario Unido, MNRU) was a right-wing political party in Bolivia.

In 1980 the right group split from the Revolutionary Nationalist Movement and founded the United Revolutionary Nationalist Movement. Led by Guillermo Bedregal Gutiérrez and Miguel Trigo Rodríguez.

In 1980 elections the MNRU allied with the Movement of the National Left and presented Guillermo Bedregal Gutiérrez as its presidential candidate; he won 1.87 per cent of the vote.

In 1985 the MNRU reintegrated with historical Revolutionary Nationalist Movement led by Víctor Paz Estenssoro.
