= Democratic Revolutionary Alliance (Bolivia) =

The Democratic Revolutionary Alliance (Spanish: Alianza Demócrata Revolucionaria, ADR) was a small Bolivian organization based on the social doctrines of the Catholic Church.

The ADR was founded by Edgar Oblitas, Fernando Capriles, and Waldo Cerruto in 1959.

In 1966 the Democratic Revolutionary Alliance took part in an electoral coalition Christian Democratic Community backing Bernardino Bilbao Rioja.
After the coup d'état on 26 September 1969 the ADR disappeared.
