= Luis Adolfo Siles Salinas =

President of Bolivia in 1969

Luis Adolfo Siles Salinas OCA OMC OSP OYC
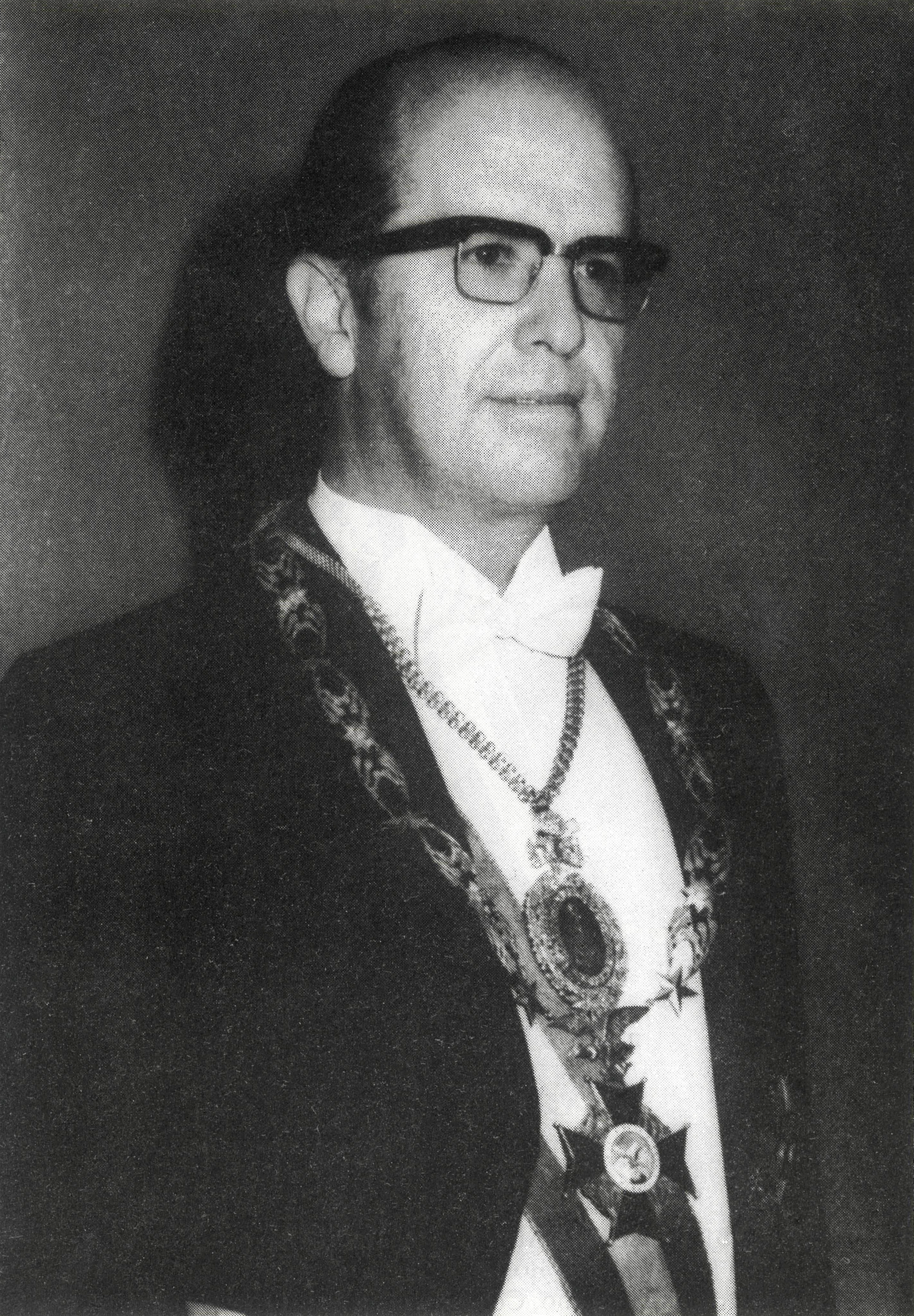
- Official portrait, 1969

49th President of Bolivia
- In office 27 April 1969 – 26 September 1969
- Vice President: Vacant
- Preceded by: René Barrientos
- Succeeded by: Alfredo Ovando

31st Vice President of Bolivia
- In office 6 August 1966 – 27 April 1969
- President: René Barrientos
- Preceded by: René Barrientos (1964)
- Succeeded by: Jaime Paz Zamora (1982)

Personal details
- Born: Luis Adolfo Siles Salinas; 21 June 1925 La Paz, Bolivia
- Died: 19 October 2005 (aged 80) La Paz, Bolivia
- Party: Offensive of the Democratic Left (1978–1980); Social Democratic (1944–1978)
- Spouse: Clemencia Santa Cruz García
- Parents: Hernando Siles Reyes; Luisa Salinas Vega
- Relatives: Hernán Siles Zuazo (half-brother); Jorge Siles Salinas (brother)
- Education: University of San Francisco Xavier
- Occupation: Jurist; lawyer; politician

Luis Adolfo Siles Salinas (21 June 1925 – 19 October 2005) was a Bolivian jurist, lawyer, politician, and human rights activist who served as the 49th president of Bolivia from April to September 1969. He previously served as the 31st vice president of Bolivia under René Barrientos from 1966 to 1969.

== Background and early life ==
Born in La Paz, Luis Adolfo Siles was the son of former president Hernando Siles Reyes (1926–1930) and half-brother of another Bolivian politician and two-time president, Hernán Siles Zuazo (1956–1960 and 1982–1985). Educated as a lawyer in his native country, he also obtained a doctorate in Spain. Siles eventually joined the small Partido Demócrata Cristiano (Christian-Democrat Party), which supported René Barrientos in the 1966 elections. Eisenhower Fellowships selected Luis Adolfo Siles in 1955 to represent Bolivia.

== Vice President of Bolivia ==
Siles ran as General Barrientos' vice-presidential running mate, and was sworn in in that capacity after their ticket prevailed at the polls.

== President of Bolivia ==
Siles became president when Barrientos was killed in a helicopter crash near Arque, Cochabamba, on 27 April 1969.

The Siles presidency was short and marred by disagreements with the powerful Commander of the Armed Forces, General Alfredo Ovando. The latter harbored ambitions to become president in 1970, when he was projected to run as Barrientos' successor. But Ovando's disagreements with Barrientos on a number of important issues during the 1967–69 period had displeased many die-hard Barrientos followers, including Vice-president Siles. For these reasons, in addition to resentment over the constant meddling by Ovando, Siles seemed to be throwing his support behind the surprise candidacy of the Mayor of La Paz, Armando Escobar Uría, as the true heir and successor to Barrientos (Bolivian laws did not allow direct re-election of a sitting president). This threatened to spoil General Ovando's carefully laid plans.

=== Overthrown by a coup d'état ===
In the end General Ovando decided not to wait for the elections and instead launched a coup d'état on 26 September 1969, overthrowing Siles and with him, what was left of Bolivian democracy (or its appearances, in any case).

== Later years ==
Returning to Bolivia during the dictatorship of Hugo Banzer (1971–1978), Siles played a prominent role as a defender of human rights. He ran for president in 1980, but failed to garner much support. Despite leading a relatively small party, Siles vociferously opposed the 1980–1981 dictatorship of Luis García Meza.

=== Death ===
Respected for his steadfast stance in defense of democratic principles, Siles died on 19 October 2005 in La Paz.

== Electoral history ==
Electoral history of Luis Adolfo Siles
Year	Office	Party	Alliance	Votes			Result
Year	Office	Party	Alliance	Total	%	P.	Result
1966	Vice president	Social Democratic Party	Front of the Bolivian Revolution	677,805	67.14	1st	Won
1978	Senator	Offensive of the Democratic Left	Democratic and Popular Unity	[data missing]			Annulled
1979	President	Offensive of the Democratic Left	March for Left-wing Social Advancement	Did not contest			Lost
1980	President	Offensive of the Democratic Left	Democratic Revolutionary Front	39,401	3.01	5th	Lost

Political offices
Preceded by René Barrientos	Vice President of Bolivia; 1966–1969	Succeeded by Jaime Paz Zamora
Preceded by René Barrientos	President of Bolivia; 1969	Succeeded by Alfredo Ovando
