= Jacobo Aillón =

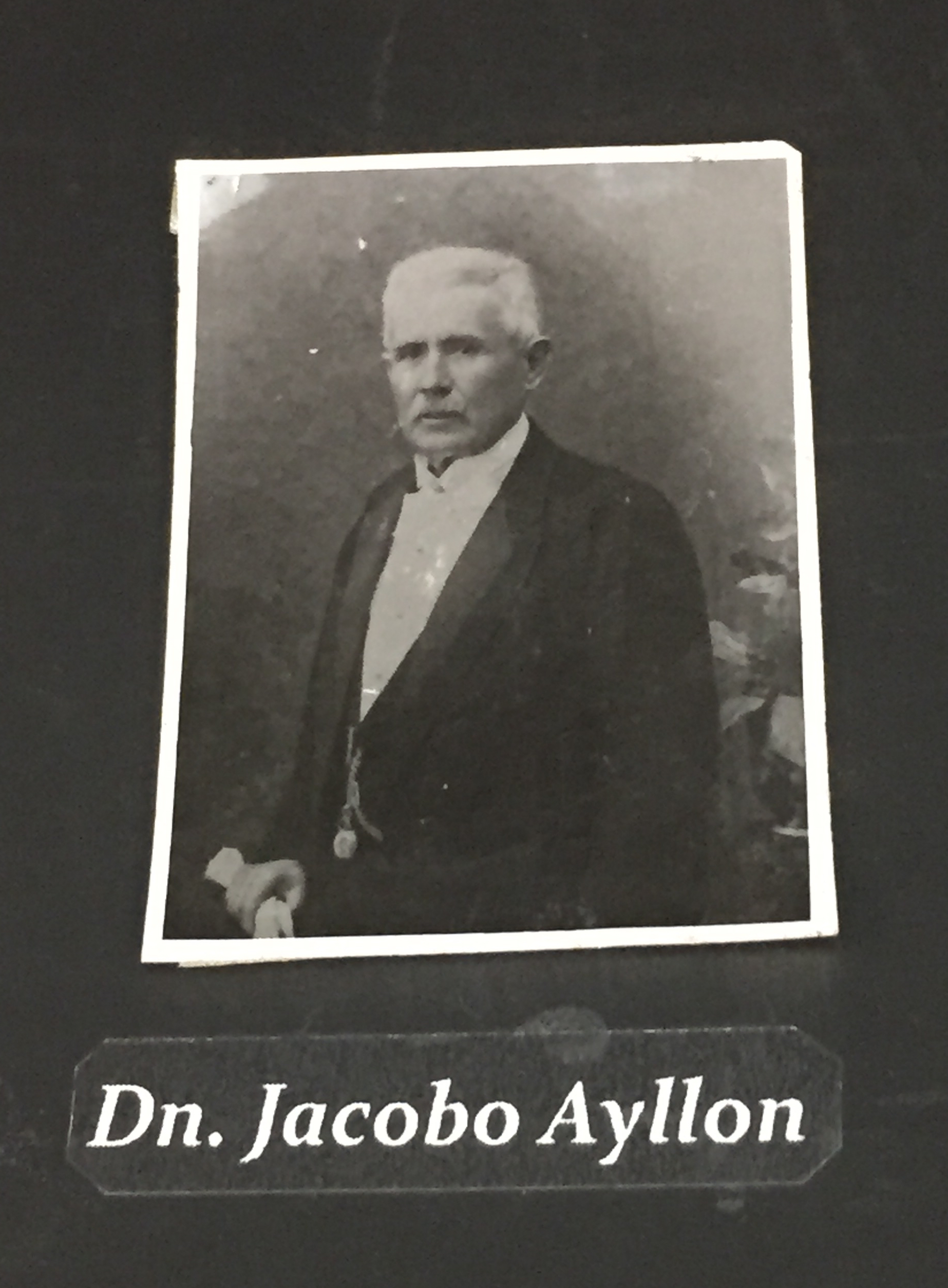
Jacobo Aillón, ca. 1870–80.

Jacobo Aillón, or Ayllon as it is sometimes spelled, (1825, Tumusla –1893, Sucre) was a Bolivian industrialist, landowner and politician. He had residencies in Sucre and Potosí, as well as several haciendas in the Chichas province. His wife Juana Aramayo Villegas was a cousin of the "tin baron" José Avelino Aramayo.

== Biography ==
Aillón was the majority owner of the Colquechaca Company in Aullagas, one of the largest mining companies in Potosí, founded in 1878 from the merger of Casa Arteche and Señores Solá, Cornejo, Viaña, Uriooste y Vidal, old mining companies that had been in operation since the 18th century. The discovery of an enormous silver vein in Aullagas initiated an economic boom in Bolivia, which saw the light of a multitude of mining ventures and financial speculations within the financial and political elite. Aillón became one of the leading mining industrialists of the time.

With the aim of facilitating mineral exploitation in Bolivia, Jacobo Aillón founded a mining bank in Tupiza, called Banco de Cotagaita, which in 1866 was re-established as the Banco Sucursal de Chichas.

The following year (1867) Aillón was named Commander in Chief of the Chichas province, with the grade of coronel in spite of not being a career military.

Parallel to his financial schemes Aillón held several public offices, such as Prefect of the Potosí department and Member of the National Congress. His enterprises had strong international interests and exhibited in several of the World Fairs of London (1862), Paris (1889) and Chicago (1893). The Colquechaca Company had in fact a subsidiary company with offices in London.

Like many of the great landowners and industrialists of his time, Jacobo Aillón was constantly involved in litigations in matters of business and honor. His public disputes have left significant traces in the many pamphlets that Aillón published against his detractors. He was repeatedly accused of corrupt ties to the government and of oligarchic behaviour.

During his lifetime Aillón was one of the richest Bolivian silver barons of the 19th century, yet in the time of his death in 1893 the Bolivian mining industry had entered an economic crisis due to falling silver prices on the world market. The year of Jacobo Aillón's death, the bank he owned (Banco Potosí) held a liquid capital of £170.000 (equivalent of approximately £20.570.000 in 2018). Yet two years later the bank was forced to liquidate due to insolvency, taking the even larger Banco Francisco Argandoña with it in the fall. According to the bankruptcy report by Enrique Calvo of 1893, the bank had authorised credits from a London bank to Aillón of more than £11000 against shares, money that remained unaccounted for. However, no directly illicit financial operations were uncovered.

== Financial interests ==
Jacobo Aillón founded and was majority shareholder of the following companies:

- Colquechaca Company, Cotagaita.
- Compañía Minera Aullagas, Aullagas.
- Aillón Aramayo y Cia, London.
- Banco de Cotagaita, Potosí.
- Banco Sucursal de Chichas, Tupiza.
- Banco Potosí, Sucre.
