= Christian Democratic Community =

1966 Electoral alliance in Bolivia

The Christian Democratic Community (Spanish: Comunidad Democrática Cristiana, CDC) was an electoral political alliance of the Bolivian Socialist Falange, FSB; the National Association of Democratic Professions, ANPD and the Democratic Revolutionary Alliance, ADR.

The Christian Democratic Community was established in 1966, for the 1966 presidential and congressional elections. It presented as its presidential candidate Bernardino Bilbao Rioja (FSB) and Gonzalo Romero Álvarez (FSB), as vice-presidential candidate.
