= Socialist Party – 1 =

Defunct political party in Bolivia

Socialist Party – 1 Partido Socialista – 1
- Abbreviation: PS-1
- Founder: Marcelo Quiroga Santa Cruz
- Founded: February 1978
- Dissolved: 4 May 1999
- Split from: Socialist Party
- Newspaper: Mañana el Pueblo
- Ideology: Socialism
- Political position: Left-wing
- Colors: Red

Website
- partidosocialista1.org.bo

The Socialist Party – 1 (Spanish: Partido Socialista – 1; PS-1) was a socialist political party in Bolivia.

== History ==
The Socialist Party – 1 took part in the 1978, 1979, and 1980 general elections, running Marcelo Quiroga Santa Cruz and polled 0.43, 4.82 and 8.71 per cent of the vote, respectively. The party won five seats in National Congress in 1979 and eleven in 1980.

Some elements in the conservative military feared Quiroga Santa Cruz's potential following as an opposition leader and he was killed during the Luis García Meza Tejada coup of 17 July 1980. His death left the PS-1 – and Bolivian left-wing politics generally – in a greatly weakened condition.

In 1984 the PS-1 absorbed the small ultra-left “Spartacus Revolutionary Movement” (Movimiento Revolucionario Espartaco, MRE), led by Dulfredo Rua.

The PS-1 resented Ramiro Velasco Romero as its candidate in the 1985 elections, but he won only 02.58 per cent of the vote, coming sixth. The party won five seats in National Congress.

In the 1989 elections the party presented Roger Cortez Hurtado and he won 2.8 per cent of the vote.

In 1993 the PS-1 took part in an electoral coalition United Left backing Ramiro Velasco, a leader of the PS-1. He won only 0.9 per cent of the vote.

There was also a dissident Socialist Party – 1-Marcelo Quiroga, led by José María Palacios.

The party lost its legal status on 4 May 1999 after not participating in two consecutive election cycles.
