= Social Democratic Party (Bolivia) =

Bolivian political party

The Social Democratic Party (Spanish: Partido Social Demócrata, PSD) was a conservative, small and elitist, but influential Bolivian political party formed by middle-class intellectuals.

The Social Democratic Party was founded in 1944 by younger, conservative Bolivians committed to modernization and the technological and technocratic strategies they believed necessary to achieve it.

Led by Luis Adolfo Siles Salinas (Hernán Siles Zuazo's half-brother), Roberto Arce, Manfredo Kempf Mercado, Gastón Arduz Eguia, Alberto Crespo Gutiérrez, Tomás Guillermo Elio, and Mario Estenssoro, the party embraced developmentalist, nominally Christian-Democratic principles.

For the 1947 general elections, the Party allied with the Liberal Party and Revolutionary Left Party and backed Liberal Luis Femando Guachalla as the coalition's presidential candidate.

For the 1951 general elections, the PSD allied with the Republican Socialist Unity Party and backed PURS' presidential candidate Gabriel Gosálvez Tejada.

During the Revolutionary Nationalist Movement regime (1952–1964), the Social Democratic Party was a minor force, allied electorally with the Bolivian Socialist Falange. It was generally regarded as an ideological relic of the prerevolutionary period, surviving only because its leaders were relatively young.

After Víctor Paz Estenssoro's overthrow in 1964, the Social Democratic Party obtained a new lease on life and cooperated with the military regime of General René Barrientos Ortuño. Their influence no doubt was stimulated by the growing prominence of "technocrats" in the military dictatorships of Brazil and Argentina. For the 1966 general elections PSD allied with the Revolutionary Left Party, Authentic Revolutionary Party and Popular Christian Movement and backed Barrientos as the coalition's presidential candidate. The PSD's leader, Luis Adolfo Siles Salinas was chosen as vice-presidential candidate.

The PSD withdrew support Barrientos in 1968, but returned to a pro-government stance, when René Barrientos Ortuño died in a helicopter crash on 27 April 1969 and Siles Salinas became president, serving with conspicuous dedication and honesty for five months until overthrown by General Alfredo Ovando Candía.

In succeeding years, the Social Democratic Party became inactive after that, although Luis Adolfo Siles Salinas continued to pursue his presidential ambitions.
