= Popular Christian Movement =

Defunct political party in Bolivia

Popular Christian Movement Movimiento Popular Cristiano
- President: René Barrientos
- Founded: 1966
- Dissolved: 1979
- Merged into: Nationalist Democratic Action
- Headquarters: La Paz
- Ideology: Agrarianism; Conservatism; Christian democracy
- Political position: Centre-right
- National affiliation: Nationalist Union of the People (1978–79)
- Colours: Azure

The Popular Christian Movement (Spanish: Movimiento Popular Cristiano, MPC) was a political party in Bolivia, de facto controlled by the military junta.

== History ==
The MPC was founded by General René Barrientos Ortuño in 1966 after the overthrow on 5 November 1964 of the Revolutionary Nationalist Movement (MNR) government of President Víctor Paz Estenssoro by a military coup under the leadership of René Barrientos and General Alfredo Ovando Candía. Its purpose was to support René Barrientos in the general election the military regime arranged on 3 July 1966. During the three years René Barrientos remained in power, the Popular Christian Movement was the government party. The organizing cadres for the party were drawn from a variety of sources with the largest single source being from the old anti-Víctor Paz Estenssoro factions of the MNR.

The Popular Christian Movement differed somewhat from other official parties in that it sought – and to a degree maintained – contact with peasant union organizations. This rallying of peasant support was part of René Barrientos's strategy of allying the military with the conservative post-reform peasantry. No subsequent military leader has been able to sustain this alliance effectively. The Popular Christian Movement, like other parties organized from the presidential palace, served to give some politicians a start in national politics. José Ortiz Mercado, for example, who became a major figure in the Alfredo Ovando Candía administration (1969–1971), was a Popular Christian Movement member of the National Congress from Santa Cruz Department elected in 1966.

For all practical purposes, the MPC died with the accidental death of General René Barrientos Ortuño early 27 April 1969 and has had no political power in decades.

In 1978, the Popular Christian Movement took part in an electoral coalition Nationalist Union of the People backing Juan Pereda Asbún.

In 1979, the MPC dissolved into Hugo Banzer Suárez's new Nationalist Democratic Action (ADN).
