= Marcelo Quiroga Santa Cruz =

Bolivian writer and politician

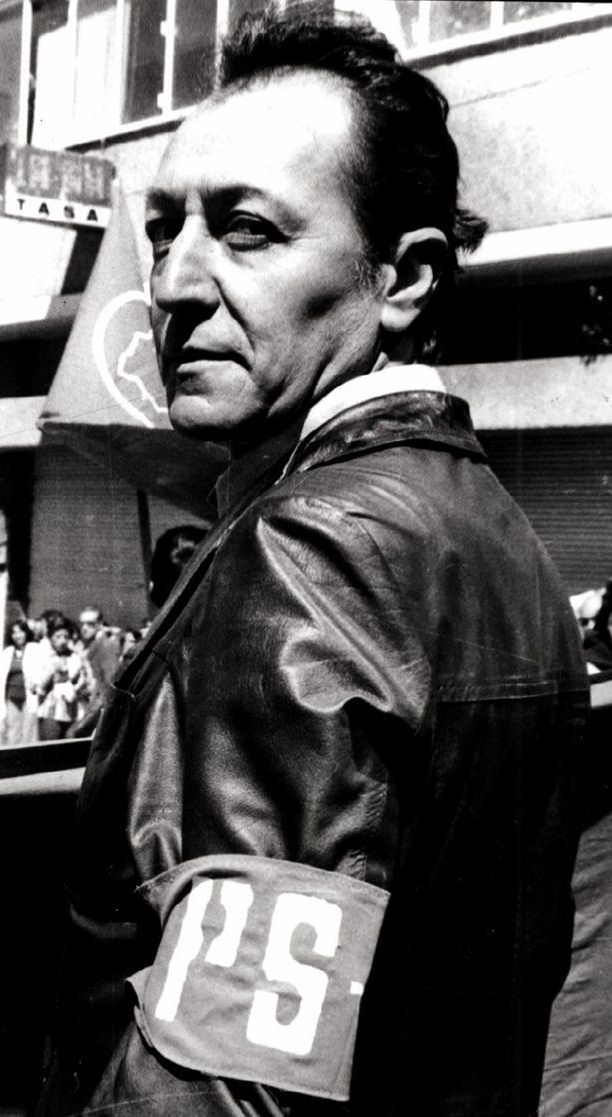
- Born: 13 March 1931; Cochabamba, Bolivia
- Died: 17 July 1980 (aged 49); La Paz, Bolivia
- Education: University of Chile
- Occupations: Writer, journalist, politician
- Political party: Socialist Party; Socialist Party-1
- Spouse: María Cristina Trigo (m. 1954)

Marcelo Quiroga Santa Cruz (13 March 1931 – 17 July 1980) was a noted writer, dramatist, journalist, social commentator, university professor, and socialist political leader from Bolivia. In 1964 Marcelo won the PEN/Faulkner Award for Fiction for his novel Los Deshabitados.

== Biography ==
Marcelo Quiroga Santa Cruz married María Cristina Trigo in 1954. She gave birth to their daughter María Soledad in Santiago in 1957, and to their son Pablo Rodrigo in Salta in 1959.

=== Political career ===
As a congressman of the Falange Socialista Boliviana, he was jailed by the regime of General René Barrientos (1964–69) for his loud denunciation of the San Juan Massacre, in which dozens of dissenting miners were murdered by the Bolivian military in the Siglo XX mines on Saint John's Eve 1967. In 1969, he was appointed Minister of Mining and Energy by the de facto President Alfredo Ovando Candía, who purported to be a populist dedicated to bringing major structural reforms. Quiroga recommended, and then carried out, the controversial nationalization of the Bolivian concerns of the US-based Gulf Oil Company. This turned him into a national celebrity of sorts. Forced out of the Ovando government by conservative military officers who considered him an enemy of the military, Quiroga went on to form the Partido Socialista in 1971. His portion of the party then came to be known as the Partido Socialista-1 following a split while in exile during the long years of the Hugo Banzer dictatorship (1971–78).

Upon returning to Bolivia in 1977, Quiroga participated in the presidential elections of 1978, 1979 (inconclusively) and in 1980. He did particularly well in the 1980 contest, when he finished fourth with double the number of votes he had received in 1979. He was clearly on the rise, and, in fact, had become the most visible and popular spokesman for the Socialist left. From his congressional seat, he led the effort to bring to trial the former dictator Hugo Banzer, on charges of massive human rights violations and economic mismanagement.

=== Death and legacy ===
During the early hours of 17 July 1980, during the coup led by General Luis Garcia Meza, Quiroga was brutally abducted and subsequently assassinated. Many witnessed, at the headquarters of the Central Obrera Boliviana, his wounding and abduction by security forces. He had been participating in a high-level meeting to discuss ways to resist the coup.

In 1986, Garcia Meza, interior minister Luis Arce Gómez, and their collaborators were found guilty in trials of responsibility for the deaths of Quiroga and others. Garcia Meza was extradited from Brazil in 1995 and imprisoned until his death in April 2018. In a posthumous letter, he denied responsibility for Quiroga's death, and blamed many of his regime's crimes on Arce Gómez.

Quiroga's remains were never recovered. In 2010, Quiroga's wife María Cristina Trigo filed a lawsuit before the Inter-American Commission on Human Rights (IACHR) against the Bolivian government due to its lack of willingness to locate them.

Quiroga's reputation in Bolivia as a gifted orator and uncompromising idealist has contributed to Bolivians seeing him as one of the martyrs of the anti-authoritarian and pro-democratic struggles of the 1970s.

== List of works ==
=== Essays ===
El Saqueo de Bolivia (1979)

=== Novels ===
Los Deshabitados (1964)
