= Bolivian Socialist Falange =

Bolivian Socialist Falange Falange Socialista Boliviana
- Leader: Óscar Calderón Camacho
- Founder: Óscar Únzaga de la Vega
- Founded: August 15, 1937, in Santiago, Chile
- Headquarters: La Paz, Bolivia
- Ideology: Bolivian nationalism Revolutionary nationalism Third Position; Anti-imperialism
- Political position: Far-right
- Religion: Roman Catholicism
- National affiliation: Christian Democratic Community (1966); Nationalist Popular Front (1971-1974); Nationalist Union of the People (1978)
- Slogan: Dios, Patria y Hogar
- Chamber of Deputies: 0 / 130
- Senate: 0 / 36

Party flag

Website
- https://www.facebook.com/fsb.bo

The Bolivian Socialist Falange (Spanish: Falange Socialista Boliviana, FSB) is a Bolivian political party established in 1937. It is a nationalist party drawing inspiration from Falangism. It was the country's second-largest party between approximately 1954 and 1974. After that, its followers have tended to gravitate toward the government-endorsed military candidacy of General Juan Pereda (1978) and, especially, toward the ADN party of former dictator Hugo Banzer.

== Foundation and early development ==
Founded in Chile by a group of exiles (chief among whom was Óscar Únzaga de la Vega), the FSB initially drew its inspiration from Spanish falangism. Indeed, in those early years it came close to espousing a Fascist agenda, in the style of Spain's Francisco Franco and Italy's Benito Mussolini. It was reformist, however, in that it advocated major transformations to the existing (largely oligarchic) social and political order. This brought it more into the sphere of other revolutionary movements such as the Revolutionary Nationalist Movement (MNR) of Víctor Paz Estenssoro, which would come to power after unleashing the 1952 Revolution. In fact, FSB was at first brought into the MNR coalition at the outbreak of that massive revolt, but backed out at the last moment. A rather minor movement during the 1940s, the "Falange" began to attract major support from former landowners and other members of the Bolivian elite after the triumph of the 1952 Revolution, becoming the ruling MNR's main opposition party. FSB's growing popularity coincided, in particular, with a period of high inflation in the country under the presidency of Hernán Siles Zuazo (1956–1960), and included many well-to-do university students. The movement was based on a cell system and so became stronger in some specific areas, notably in La Paz and Santa Cruz, although attempts to win over the peasantry in Cochabamba proved fruitless and damaged the party's growth.

As well as political activity the FSB was also involved in several minor insurrections against the government, culminating in an uprising in April 1959 during which the FSB briefly held part of the capital La Paz. This was suppressed by the army, with fifty dying in the fighting—including Unzaga, whose death was officially ruled as suicide.

== Ideology ==
Ideologically, the party's stance evolved from an adherence to Spanish falangism to a more moderate form of statism. Perhaps inspired by the efforts of the ruling MNR at perpetuating itself in power in the manner of Mexico's Institutional Revolutionary Party party, FSB, too, sought the creation of a strong one-party state, with the Army and the Church held up as the two great pillars of Bolivian society. In the 1950s the Falange adopted a strong anti-communist stance, with its leaders being particularly critical of Cuba's Fidel Castro following his emergence. Alongside this, however, FSB portrayed itself as being nationalist and anti-imperialist. During the 1950s it also sought to emphasise a strong Roman Catholic identity.

As a political party, the FSB supports a political doctrine of nationalist and revolutionary orientation, seeking to transform Bolivian society on the basis of Christian philosophy and organic democracy, concept usually associated with Francoism. The FSB also stands on a Third Positionist platform, adopting an anti-Marxist and anti-liberal stance and supporting an 'heterodox' form of socialism focused on "human solidarity".

Nazi German war criminal and former SS-Hauptsturmführer Klaus Barbie settled in La Paz in 1951 and shortly afterwards witnessed a march by FSB members. Barbie claimed that the sight of the uniformed, armband-wearing militants giving the Roman salute made him feel at home and he soon sought out leading members of the party and became close to them.

== Electoral performance ==
The party supported the candidacy of the war hero General Bernardino Bilbao Rioja in the 1951 presidential elections. Bilbao secured a respectable 11% of the vote, and he would later return as a candidate. In those elections, anti-system parties such as the MNR and FSB had won a combined majority, but the MNR were prevented from taking office by military intervention on behalf of the oligarchy, leading to the 1952 Revolution. With the collapse of Bolivia's traditional parties, the FSB found itself as the leading opposition force in the country. Óscar Únzaga, however, remained the party's undisputed leader, and it was he who led FSB's 1956 presidential ticket. He garnered 15% of the vote in an election that many considered suspect due to massive state support for the government-endorsed candidate, Hernán Siles Zuazo. FSB lost momentum after the death of Únzaga during a failed coup in 1959. The party was at this point strongly suppressed politically, and new parties began to appeal to similar sections of society. The party's vote share fell to 8% in the 1960 elections partly as a result.

== Later development ==
Following the death of Únzaga, the mainstream of the FSB came under the leadership of Mario Gutiérrez. the party's candidate in the 1960 elections. Following the return of the military to power in the aftermath of the 1964 coup d'état, it was the MNR's turn to be repressed, and FSB's fortunes seemed to be on the rise again. The FSB now sought to ally itself with an emerging Christian democratic tendency and focused its attentions on organising in the Santa Cruz Department. As a part of the Christian Democratic Community it endorsed General Bernardino Bilbao Rioja's candidacy in the 1966 presidential election although René Barrientos of the ruling faction won easily. With Congress closed in 1969 the FSB descended into in-fighting, with a leftist FSB-Izquierda (FBSI) splitting off in 1970.

Bolivia did not have another election until the late 1970s. With its leadership back in the hands of Mario Gutiérrez, FSB supported (as did the MNR) the 1971 military coup that brought to power General Hugo Banzer. Indeed, Gutiérrez served Banzer as his Minister of Foreign Relations for many years. At this point FSB shifted its position somewhat, becoming more of a pro-military conservative party. The party was excluded from government in 1974, however, when Banzer decided to establish a purely military regime without political parties. The FBSI, meanwhile, which had opposed Banzer's coup, was repressed by the new government.

The FSB's ranks were further diluted when various factions split off from it in the aftermath of the Banzer dictatorship and the electoral upheavals of the 1978-80 period. Carlos Valverde Barberry eventually emerged as leader and was presidential candidate in 1980, but results were poor. Factionalism again dogged the movement and much of it was absorbed into the conservative Nationalist Democratic Action (founded by Banzer himself). The rump FSB again came to adopt more left-wing rhetoric as a party of opposition although it was eliminated from Congress at the 1989 election and gained no seats at the 1993 election.

The FSB have returned to politics sporadically since then, and in 2002 Johnny Fernández's failed bid for the presidency was jointly endorsed by Solidarity Civic Unity and the FSB. In the 2014 presidential election they endorsed the candidacy of Christian Democratic Party representative Jorge Quiroga.

== See also ==
- Falangism in Latin America

== Bibliography ==
- Bernard, Jean-Pierre, "Bolivia", in J-P Bernard, S Cerqueira, H Neira, H Graillot, L F Manigat & P Gilhodès. 1973. Guide to the Political Parties of South America, Penguin Books, 1973
- Laqueur, Walter. 1976. Fascism: A Reader's Guide, Penguin Books, 1976
- Linklater, Magnus, Hilton, Isabel and Ascherson, Neal, The Fourth Reich: Klaus Barbie and the Neo-Fascist Connection, Hodder & Stoughton, 1984
