= 2022 Bolivian ombudsman election =

Election of a new ombudsman of Bolivia

- 5 May 2022 (first round); 23 September 2022 (final round)

Needed to win: two-thirds majority of the votes cast
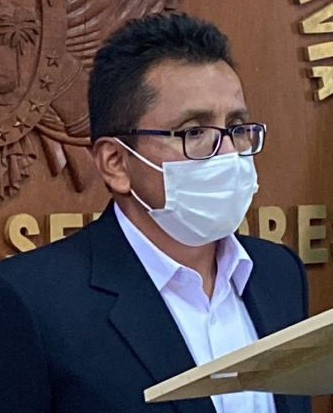

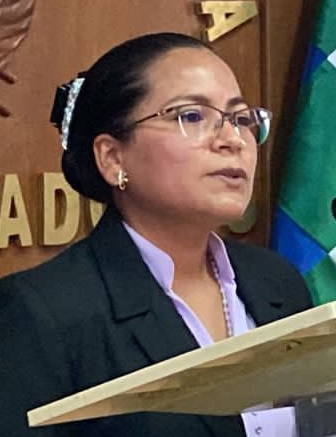
	Majority party	Minority party
Candidate	Pedro Callisaya	Evelín Cossío
Party	Nonpartisan	Nonpartisan
First round	65; 39.63%	46; 28.05%
Final round	95; 97.94%	0; 0.00%
Ombudsman before election
Nadia Cruz (acting)
Nonpartisan
Elected Ombudsman
Pedro Callisaya
Nonpartisan

The 2022 Bolivian ombudsman election took place between 15 March and 23 September 2022 during the term of the 3rd Plurinational Legislative Assembly. This unusual intra-term election for ombudsman of Bolivia was necessitated by the resignation of David Tezanos Pinto on 24 January 2019, leaving Nadia Cruz as the acting authority for more than three years, even exceeding the expiration of Tezanos Pinto's originally set six-year term. This was the sixth ombudsman election since the office was created in 1997. Constitutional lawyer Pedro Callisaya won the contest, receiving ninety-five votes, a two-thirds majority of those present but not of the total membership of both legislative chambers. Callisaya's election was supported only by the ruling Movement for Socialism, while the two opposition blocs boycotted the vote.

This was the longest process for designating an ombudsman in Bolivian history, lasting six months and eight days from the initial call for applicants in mid-March to the final election in late September. Though the ruling party and opposition managed to reach an uncommon agreement to unanimously approve the convocation of the election, disagreements reemerged in the final phase of candidate evaluation due to the qualification of multiple candidates the opposition viewed as too close to the government.

The first two rounds of voting occurred on 5 May, with no candidate reaching the necessary two-thirds threshold to be elected. In the ensuing vote, the ruling party—originally divided between Pedro Callisaya and Porfirio Machado—coalesced around the former, while the centrist Civic Community lent its support to Evelín Cossío and the right-wing Creemos nullified its vote, demanding the process be done over. In the span of five votes over the course of four months, no candidate managed to reach the necessary support to be elected as each parliamentary caucus entrenched themselves in their positions. Finally, on 23 September, the Movement for Socialism called an impromptu vote, taking advantage of the absence of—mostly opposition—parliamentarians from Santa Cruz, who were celebrating the department's anniversary. With the support of two-thirds of those present, Callisaya won the necessary majority to become the next ombudsman.

The 2022 ombudsman election process was wracked by controversy, no less due to the dubious circumstances of Callisaya's final election. Throughout the election, analysts and observers questioned the Movement for Socialism's inclination toward selecting a pro-government ombudsman. The extension of Nadia Cruz's term three years past her original ninety-day acting mandate and a lower court's ruling granting President Luis Arce the ability to unilaterally designate an ombudsman should the legislature fail to were both denounced as a usurpation of functions, with the latter decision setting a precedent for the head of state to potentially designate the country's highest electoral, judicial, and constitutional authorities when their terms expire in 2023.

== Background ==
=== Selection process ===
The ombudsman of Bolivia is the presiding officer of the Ombudsman's Office. The Plurinational Legislative Assembly elects the ombudsman to a single six-year term, computed from the date of their inauguration, without the possibility of extension. The Constitution establishes that the Legislative Assembly must issue a prior public summons for prospective candidates whose professional capacity and merits will be qualified through a public contest among those recognized for their ability in defense of human rights. Crucially, the selection process necessitates the support of two-thirds of the Legislative Assembly in a plenary session of both chambers: that is, 110 of the 166 parliamentarians—twenty-four of the thirty-six senators and eighty-seven of the 130 deputies.

=== The long interim ===
David Tezanos Pinto, a criminal lawyer from La Paz, served as the National Director of Public Defense of the Ministry of Justice from January 2014 until May 2016. As the Movement for Socialism (MAS-IPSP) assumed control of both the Chamber of Deputies and Senate with a majority of two-thirds in the 2014 elections, the party held full control over the ombudsman selection and appointment process. Upon the end of Ombudsman Rolando Villena's term on 13 May 2016, Tezanos Pinto was elected as his replacement, with the votes of 103 of the 144 legislators present.

Throughout his term, Tezanos Pinto remained at odds with the opposition, who observed a partisan inclination towards the government. However, his ultimate downfall came when his wife reported him to the Prosecutor's Office on allegations of domestic violence, leading him to present his resignation on 24 January 2019, halfway through his term. Nadia Cruz, deputy ombudsman for the defense of and compliance with human rights, was subsequently elected as the acting authority, while the Legislative Assembly carried out the task of issuing the call for a new titular ombudsman. However, this process stalled, and by 2021, Cruz's interim administration had already exceeded the length of Tezanos Pinto's entire tenure and far surpassed the ninety days the law establishes for an acting authority to remain in office.

=== Legislative process ===
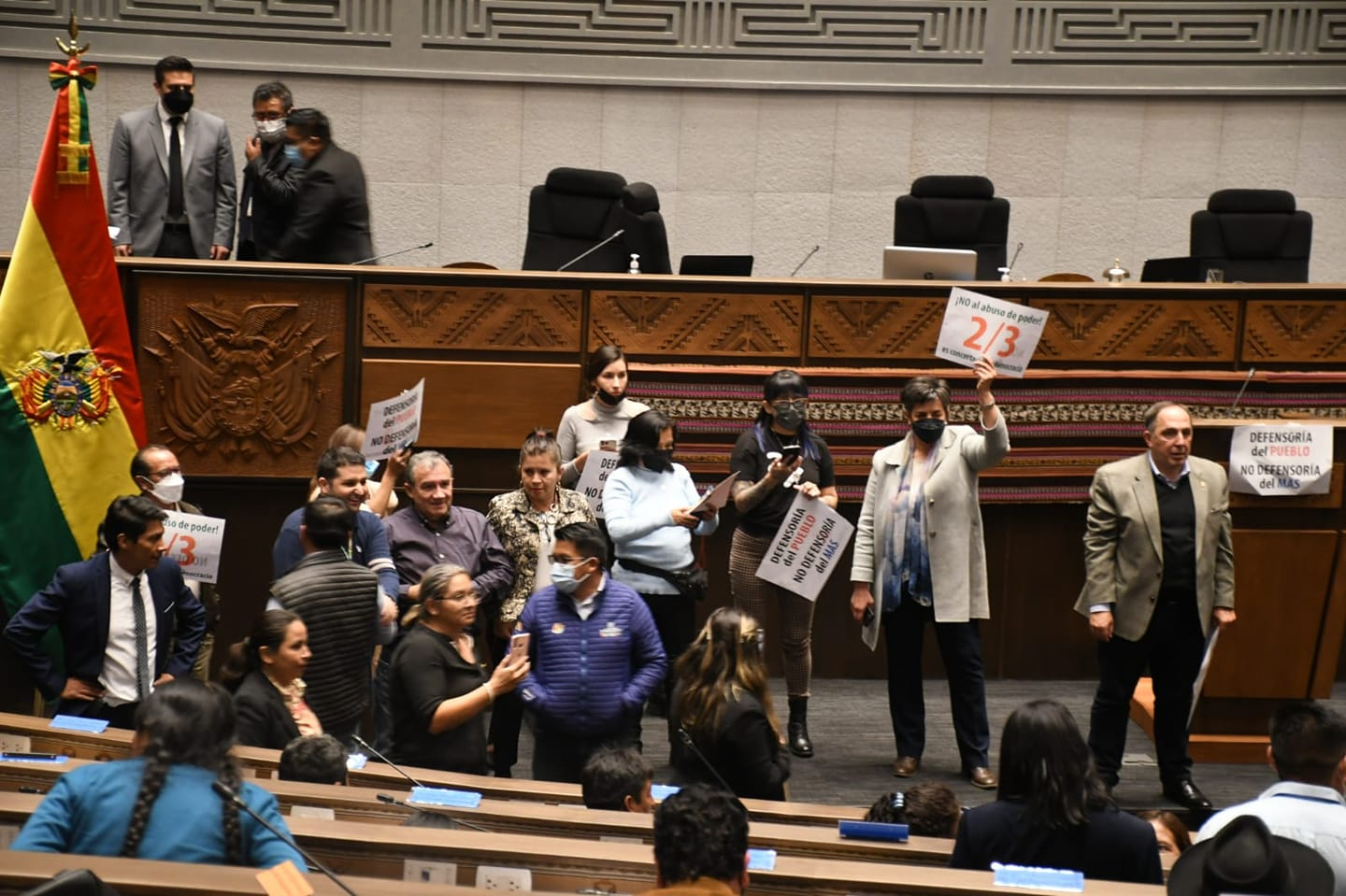
Opposition legislators protest at the front of parliament, holding up signs saying: "Ombudsman of the People, not Ombudsman of the MAS".

By the time Tezanos Pinto's originally prescribed term was set to expire in 2022, the MAS had lost its two-thirds supermajority in the 2020 election, meaning it would have to negotiate with the opposition to elect a new ombudsman. On 25 February 2022, the MAS presented a draft bill to initiate the selection and appointment process. In a marathon session on 5 March, the majority-MAS Mixed Legislative Commission of the Constitution approved the regulations to initiate the process. Although the MAS took into account some adjustments suggested by the opposition, they were nonetheless criticized for the approval of Article 20. This section of the draft regulation established that applicants for the position of ombudsman must meet at least eight of fourteen criteria before being approved. Legal analysts noted that since the MAS had a majority in the Mixed Commission, this rule would grant them complete control over the pre-selection of candidates, meaning that the plenary session of the legislature could do little more than choose between different MAS-aligned officials. Constitutional lawyer Williams Bascopé stated in this way, "the opposition is neutralized". Silvia Padilla, president of the Bolivian National Bar Association, elaborated that "the mediocrity of the opposition" had allowed institutions such as the Ombudsman's Office to "become an operating arm of the MAS".

Also questioned was Article 8 Section 15 of the draft regulation. This addendum disqualified all individuals who participated in the "rupture of the constitutional order", referring to the mass mobilizations that forced the resignation of then-president Evo Morales in November 2019, an event the MAS considers to have been a coup d'état. MAS Deputy Gualberto Arispe, who designed the regulation, stated that the rule barred all individuals who protested in 2019 or participated in the subsequent transitional government from being presented as candidates for the position of ombudsman.

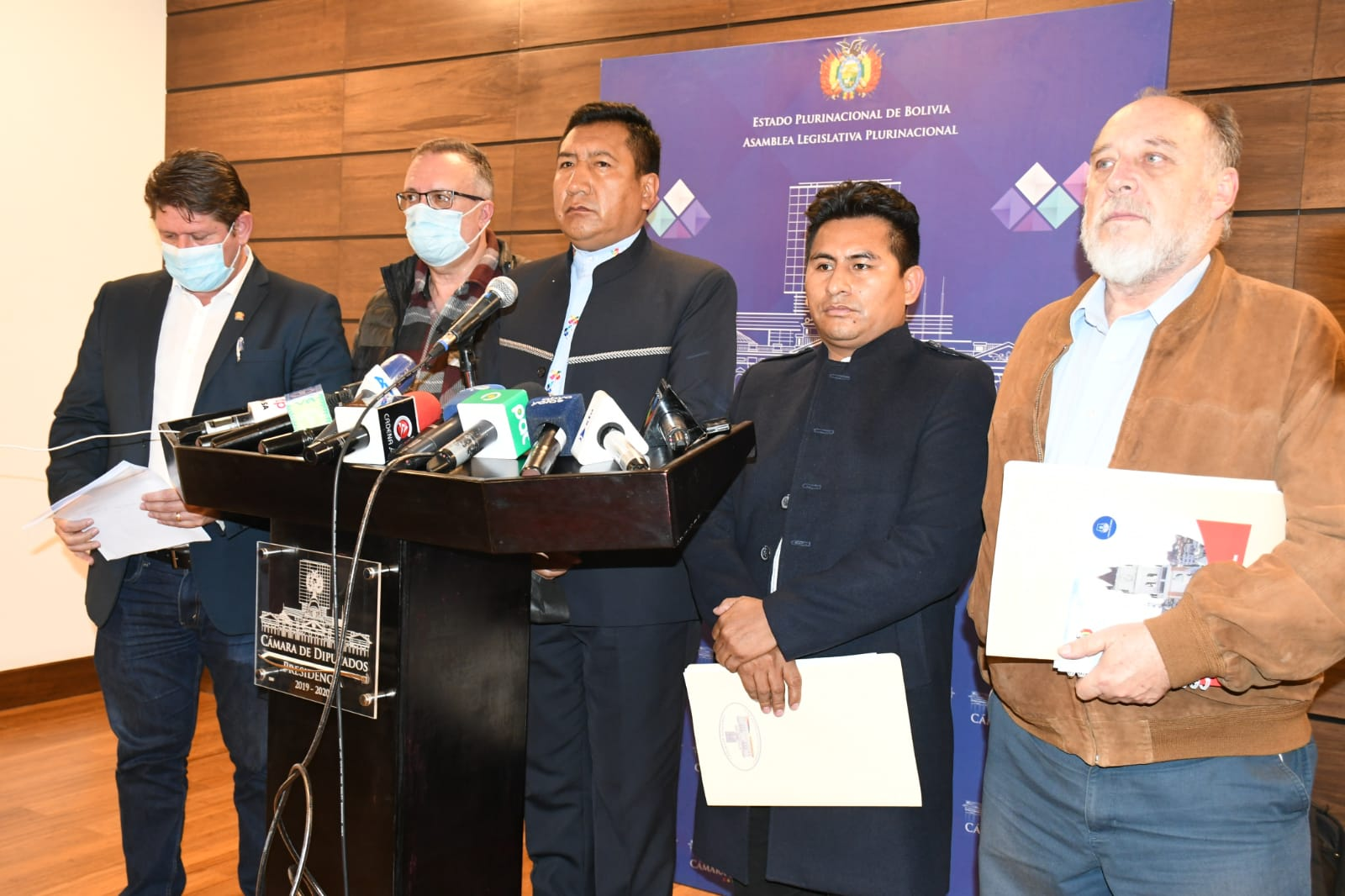
Caucus leaders announce consensus on a draft regulation to call for the election of a new ombudsman, 14 March 2022.

On 9 March, the Senate and Deputies installed a legislative session to approve the regulations and issue the call for a new ombudsman. As soon as the session began, Chuquisaca Senator Silvia Salame of Civic Community (CC) raised a preliminary motion to establish that the regulation face the approval of two-thirds of the Legislative Assembly. Salame argued that since the Constitution states that the election of the ombudsman requires two-thirds support, the regulation must also be approved by that amount. The debate on Salame's motion erupted into general disorder, with shouts and whistles, as well as physical confrontations between legislators. The quarrel forced Vice President David Choquehuanca—presiding as president of the Legislative Assembly—to suspend the session for the day and summon caucus leaders to impose order over their subordinate parliamentarians.

The following day, Choquehuanca met with caucus leaders to seek consensus between all three legislative blocs. CC maintained their proposal that the candidate selection process require the support of two-thirds of the legislature. At the same time, Creemos demanded that the disqualification of participants in the 2019 crisis be excluded as an eligibility factor. While no agreement was met, the parties agreed to resume negotiations within the next two or three days. On 14 March, caucus leaders met again to review at least a dozen articles and provisions within the draft regulation. Also present were Vice President Choquehuanca and Minister of Justice Iván Lima, a fact that, according to Creemos caucus leader José Carlos Gutiérrez, "show[ed the] predisposition" of the ruling party to resolve the conflict". After some hours of negotiations, legislators of all three caucuses announced that they had reached a consensus and that the suspended legislative session would be resumed the following day. The most notable change in the draft regulation was the removal of Article 8 Section 15, thus eliminating the ban on those involved in the 2019 crisis and bringing the candidate selection process in line with the one in 2016. Both CC and Creemos assured that their political forces would vote in favor of the amended regulation. On 15 March, the legislature reconvened and unanimously approved the amended regulations, establishing eighteen requirements to hold office. The official call for the election of an ombudsman was issued the following day, with a fifteen-day application period being opened on 18 March.

=== Observers ===
The regulations approved by the Legislative Assembly provided for oversight of the designation process by civil society organizations with recognized legal status, whose dedicated purpose is the promotion and/or defense of human rights. One of the organizations empowered to oversee the process was the Permanent Assembly of Human Rights of Bolivia (APDHB), chaired by Amparo Carvajal. However, on 29 March, it was noted that the Mixed Commission managing the election had certified a "parallel" APDHB chaired by Édgar Salazar as the supervising body. In December 2021, human rights activists affiliated with the MAS had discarded Carvajal's leadership and formed their own institution, electing a new board of directors with Salazar—a member of the MAS—as its president. Upon request, Carvajal was accredited as a citizen overseer, with the Mixed Commission clarifying that any civilian may witness the selection proceedings. Apart from Carvajal and the parallel APDHB, four other institutions were approved to oversee the process, including the Millennium Foundation and the Build Foundation.

== Applicants ==
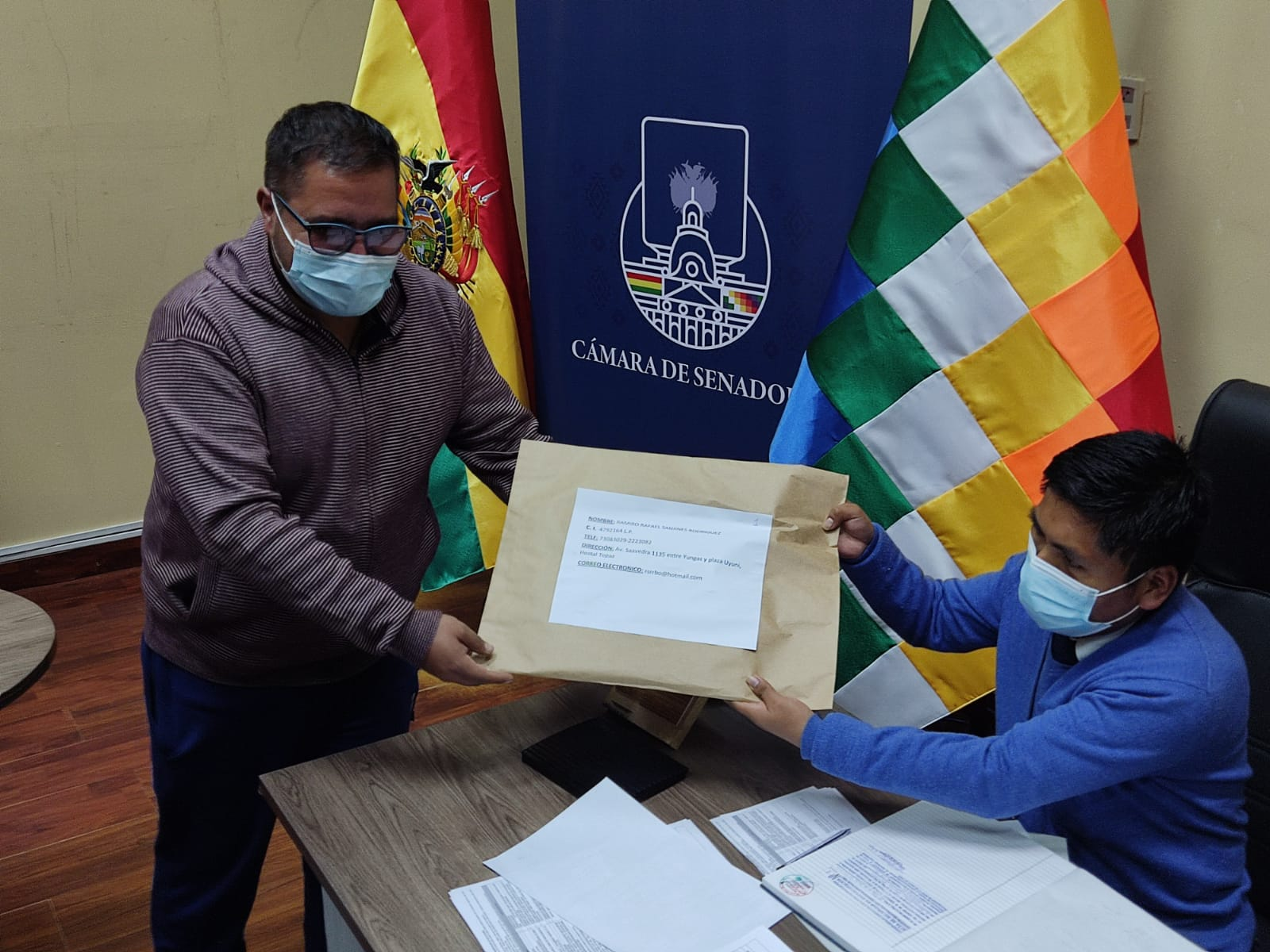
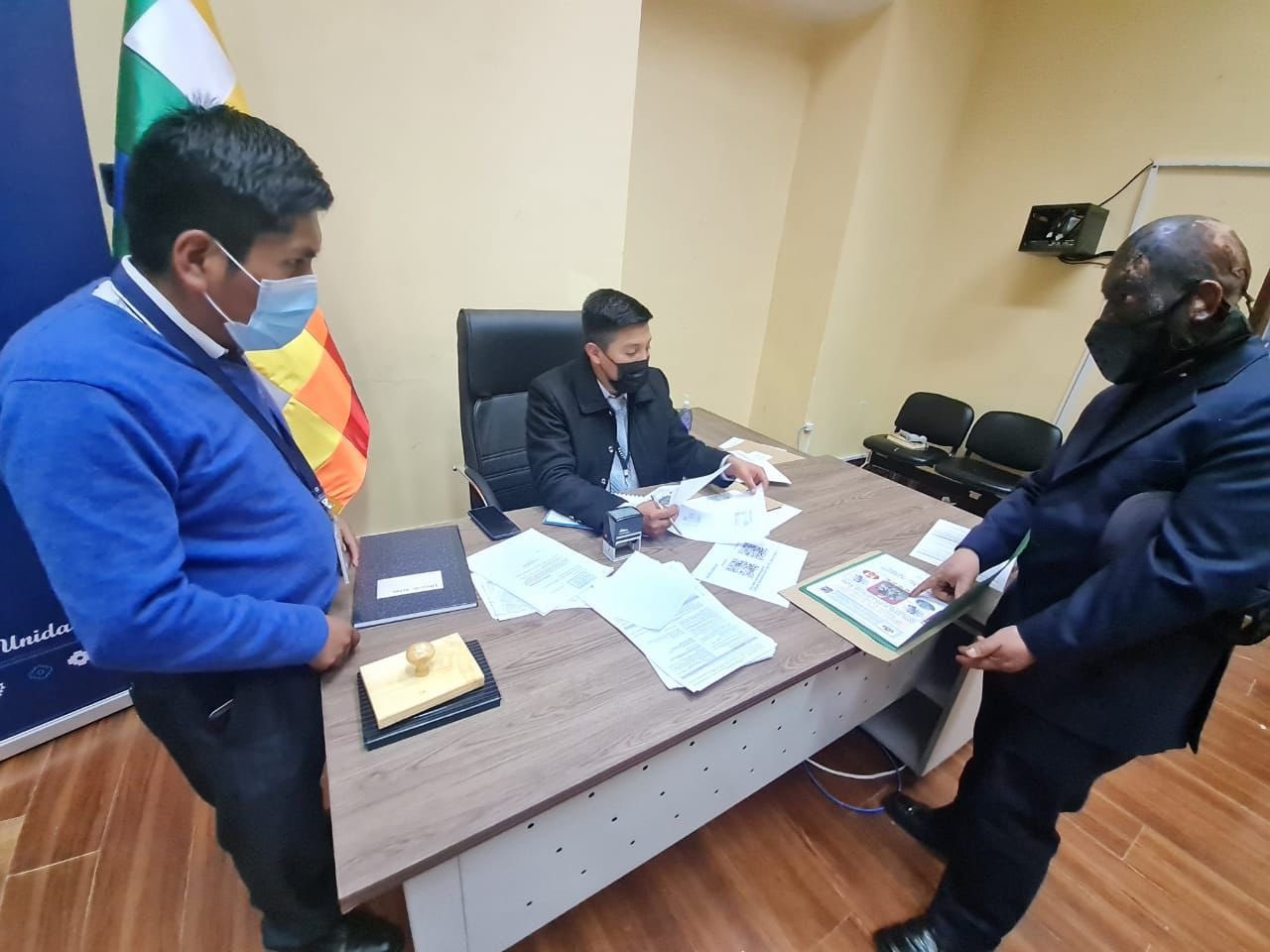
Ramiro Sanjinés and Cyborg Kanashiro register their candidacies with the Mixed Legislative Commission, 22 March 2022.

After five days without receiving any applicants, Ramiro Sanjinés, a barista and bartender, became the first person to officially register his candidacy on 22 March 2022. Sanjinés, a graduate in theology and history, had previous experience volunteering at the United Nations and Ombudsman's Office. He stated that his decision to run had been motivated by an alleged violation of his rights perpetrated by the Tax Service. If elected, Sanjinés pledged to seek the elimination of the life annuity for former presidents and stated that he would work to promote the Ombudsman's Office as a unifying force in the country.

A few hours later, Cyborg Kanashiro, a resident of Sud Yungas of Tsimané and Japanese descent, became the second applicant for the position. Kanashiro, a folk healer recognized by the Bolivian Society of Traditional Medicine (SOBOMETRA), was noted for having submitted his application while wearing a face mask made of animal and plant plasma, which he claimed was used to ward off storms. He stated that his primary goal, if elected, would be to "reconstitute natural indigenous justice". This was Kanashiro's second time applying for the position of ombudsman.

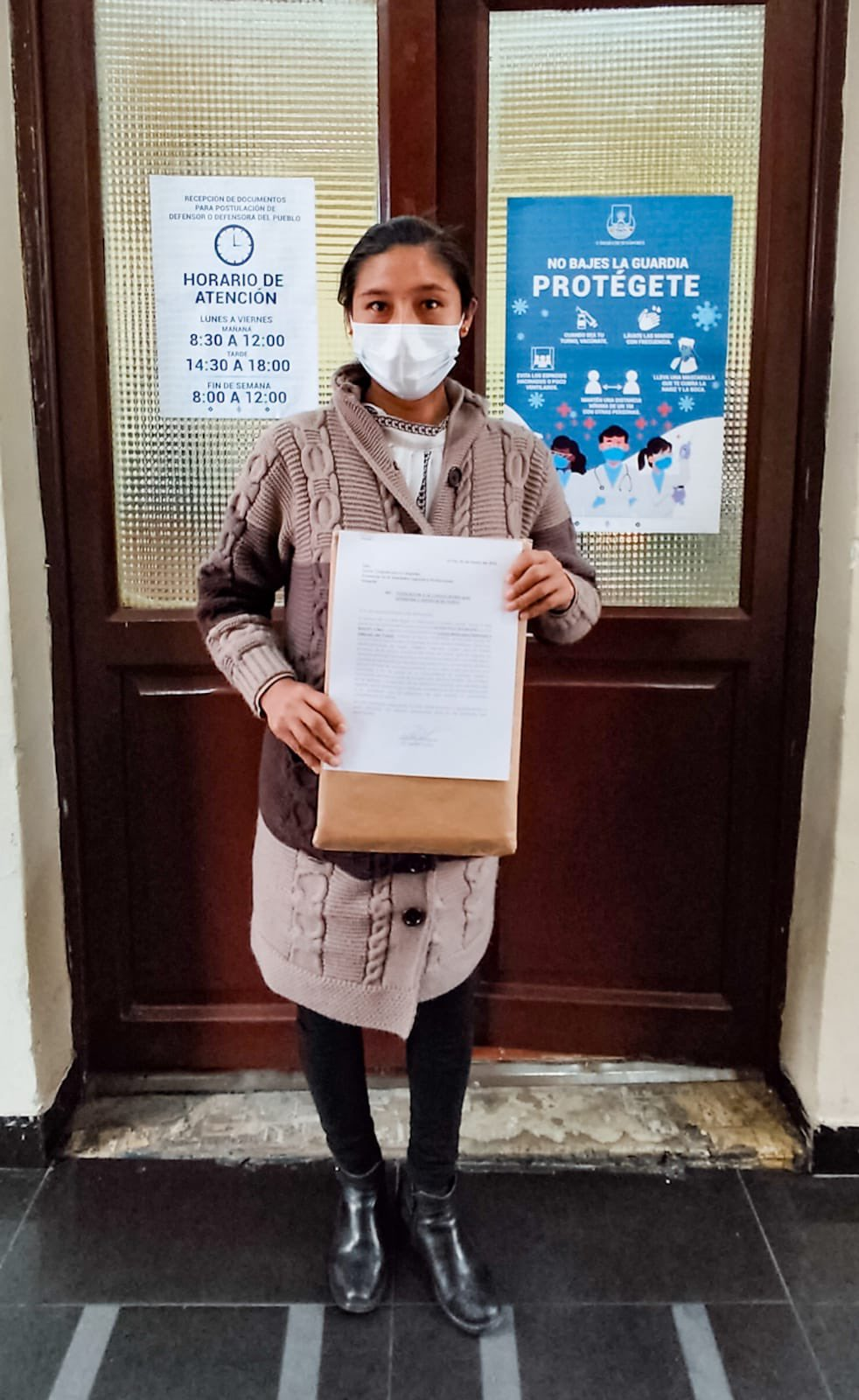
Gladis Pozo, the first woman to register her candidacy.

The third applicant was Francisco Solares, an international relations professional from Santa Cruz. A teacher at several universities, Solares had previous experience as a public policy advisor to municipalities in Tarija. Solares outlined his belief that the ombudsman should act "with complete independence" and reaffirmed his lack of party affiliation on three occasions. He explained that he had been motivated to present his candidacy in order to "recover [the] institutionality" of the Ombudsman's Office. Solares was followed on 24 March by Iván Cuevas, a teacher from El Alto with a degree in social communication and educational science. As with Kanashiro, Cuevas had previously applied for the post in 2016. The next day, René Guzmán, a family lawyer, formalized his candidacy.

On 26 March, Gladis Pozo became the first woman to register her candidacy. The thirty-three-year-old lawyer from Cochabamba stated that "the current Ombudsman is a woman; therefore, it is important for the empowerment of women that an equal woman can carry out the responsibility of being an authority in the Ombudsman's Office". Two more women, Camila Luna, a commercial engineer from La Paz, and Delma Alcón, an educational scientist from Cochabamba, submitted their applications two days later. Despite stating that she had no partisan sympathies, Alcón's personal Facebook account was noted for including several posts praising the work of MAS officials. Luna and Alcón were joined by Freddy Lima, a lawyer from La Paz. Despite his lack of previous activist or professional experience in the field, Lima assured that the daily fight for the validity of human rights qualified him to hold the position.

Lidia Patty registers her candidacy, 31 March 2022.

With eight new candidates, the number of applicants nearly doubled from nine to seventeen on 29 March. Of note was Guadalupe Daza, a former member of the Federation of Neighborhood Councils of El Alto (FEJUVE), who stated that, if elected, she would work to recover many functions of the Ombudsman's Office, including institutionality and its ability to work closely with the population. She pledged that social security and the abandonment of minors would be the main issues that her management would focus on.

Among the MAS-aligned candidates was former deputy Lidia Patty, who announced her intent to run for ombudsman on 10 March. Patty had gained public notoriety for being the main plaintiff in the coup d'état case, for which former president Jeanine Áñez and multiple interim government officials were arrested on charges of conspiracy, sedition, and terrorism. Patty considered that her active political militancy within the MAS would not impede her ability to assume the position, despite the fact that one of the eighteen criteria for holding the post was that the individual not have been a member of a political party within the past eight years. Official data from the Supreme Electoral Tribunal documented Patty as an active member of the MAS since at least 6 October 2018; she entered the Chamber of Deputies as a member of the MAS caucus in 2015, having been elected from the party's La Paz electoral list in 2014. Despite this impediment, Patty, accompanied by a large group of supporters, delivered her documentation to the Mixed Commission on 31 March.

Aside from Patty, Página Siete noted seven candidates with predominantly political histories, including Patty's own lawyer: Marcelo Valdez. Another applicant with links to the MAS was Jesús Vera, a former member of FEJUVE and former MAS candidate for deputy in the annulled 2019 elections. Regarding his previous political candidacy, Vera assured that he had no affiliation with any party. Vera had gained notoriety for his actions during the civil unrest of 2019 when he was incarcerated for 105 days for being involved in the burning of sixty-six municipal buses. At the time of his application, trial proceedings against him were actively underway. Also noted for their ties to the MAS were Luis Gallego, a former deputy from the ruling party; Edgar Mora, the first leader of the MAS Popular Civic Committee; and Idelfonso Mamani, who served as a member of the Supreme Electoral Tribunal during the government of Evo Morales. Additional applicants included Adolfo Soliz, a member of the defunct Revolutionary Left Movement who served as prefect of La Paz, and Manuel Morales, the leader of the National Committee for the Defense of Democracy (CONADE).

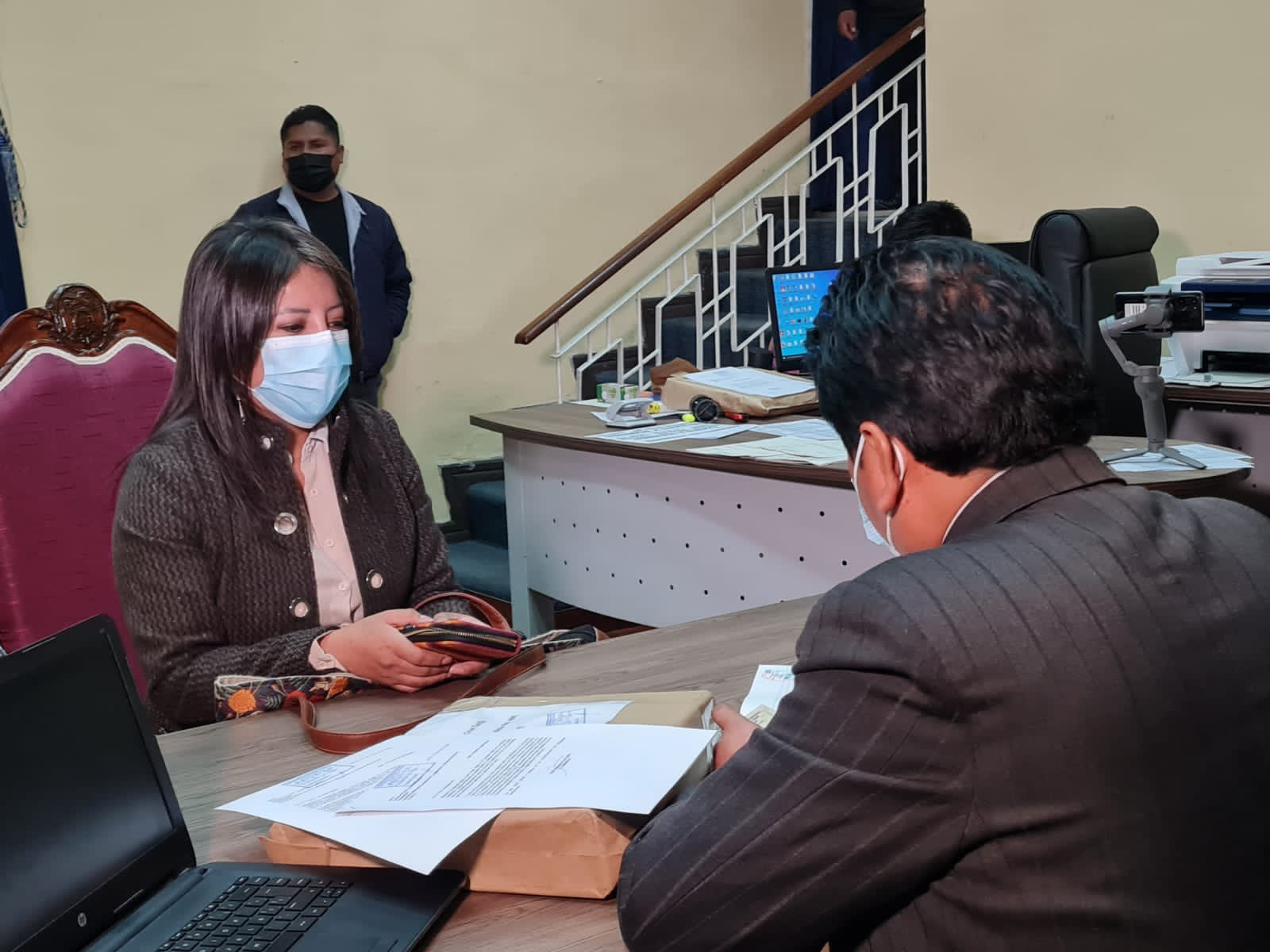
Nadia Cruz files her application for a full term, 1 April 2022.

One individual whose possible candidacy received wide speculation was María Galindo, leader of the anarcha-feminist Mujeres Creando collective. The activist had previously applied for the position in 2016 "as an act of rebellion". She asserted that the MAS had discarded her documentation on that occasion. When asked if she would reapply in 2022, Galindo neither confirmed nor denied it, instead announcing a "great surprise". In the days preceding 31 March, Galindo announced through her social networks that this surprise would cause "[the] roof of the Legislative Assembly ... to fall". However, she delayed the event by one day to avoid a confrontation between her and Patty's supporters. In the early morning of 1 April, Galindo and her entourage led a short march to the Palace of the Revolution. There, she reported to the media that she met all the requirements to apply for the position and outlined several policy proposals. Galindo assured that if elected, she would "accept this challenge as the greatest honor of my life". However, shortly thereafter, she told the Legislative Assembly to "go to hell", accusing legislators of having already negotiated the designation of the next ombudsman. Galindo proceeded to tear up her documentation before leaving the premises.

Among those speculated as a potential candidate was the incumbent acting ombudsman Nadia Cruz, who could theoretically have been elected to a full term despite already having held the position for more than three years. Initially, Cruz stated that "at this time, it is not a matter of my interest to apply for the Ombudsman's Office". Despite this, Cruz ultimately chose to register her candidacy for a full term on the final day of application. She justified that her decision to change her mind came after a period of reflection with her family, whom she stated had been victims of political harassment in recent years.

The application period closed at 6:00p.m. on 1 April with 198 registered candidates.

=== Registered ===
The following officially registered their candidacy:

22 March:

- Ramiro Rafael Sanjinés Rodríguez, barista and bartender.
- Cyborg Kanashiro Bronnkss, folk healer and candidate for ombudsman in 2016.

23 March:

- Francisco Xavier Solares Marco, public policy advisor and university professor.

24 March:

- Iván Félix Cuevas Paucara, candidate for ombudsman in 2016.

25 March:

- René Guzmán Apaza, family lawyer and legal advisor.

26 March:

- Gladis Pozo Rodríguez, lawyer.

28 March:

- Camila Jhoselin Luna Montaño, commercial engineer.
- Freddy Germán Lima Castaño, lawyer.
- Delma Alcón Terceros, educator and social communicator.

29 March:

- Jorge Erick Morón Urquiola, lawyer.
- Guadalupe Daza Capo, former member of the Federation of Neighborhood Councils of El Alto (FEJUVE).
- Damaso Quispe Callisaya, educator.
- Alejandro Alpire Alpire.
- Santiago Condori Apaza, anthropologist.
- Hugo Gonzáles Atora, lawyer.
- Ramiro Gumercindo Carrillo Aruquipa, lawyer.
- Facundo Espejo Quispe, educator and social communicator.

30 March:

- Guillermo Hernán Vilela Díez de Medina, candidate for ombudsman in 2016.
- María Yolanda Melgar Rodríguez, ombudsman of Beni (2016–present) and candidate for ombudsman in 2016.
- María Irene Vino Mejía, candidate for member of the Judicial Council in 2021.
- Rodolfo Mamani Segales, law student.
- Israel Franz Tarquino Salas, cultural manager, poet, and teacher.
- Dorotea Zalles Charca.
- Freddy Delgadillo Pérez, philosopher.
- José Joaquín Ortuño Rivas, social communicator.
- María Inés Fernández Soruco.
- Evelyn Yaruska Colque Machicado, lawyer.
- Christian Isaac Bustos Da Silva.
- Franklin Germán Gutiérrez Larrea, constitutional lawyer.
- Mario Salinas Pérez, industrial engineer.
- Yhovana Arratia Camacho, local administrator.
- Jorge Paz Yabeta, Santa Cruz departmental delegate of the Ombudsman's Office (2016–2019).

31 March:

- Ceferina Rina Zeballos Nina, lawyer.
- Luis Emilio Ayllón Martínez, gourmet, hotel technician, and law student.
- Raul Nelson Lafuente Riverola, senior technician in building construction.
- Rafael Quinteros Montaño, candidate for ombudsman in 2016.
- Porfirio Machado Gisbert, candidate for member of the Supreme Electoral Tribunal in 2019.
- Carolina Chipana Jimenez, business administrator.
- Pedro Domingo Andrade Rodríguez, anthropologist and social communicator.
- Miguel Ángel Balboa Pizarro, systems engineer.
- René Choque Mamani, business administrator.
- José Mateo Gambarte Flores, English professor and social communicator.
- Edgar Mora Pahuasi, former leader of the MAS Popular Civic Committee and candidate for ombudsman in 2016.
- Lidia Patty Mullisaca, (Movement for Socialism), former member of the Chamber of Deputies from La Paz (2018–2020), former alternate member of the Chamber of Deputies from La Paz (2015–2018).
- Raúl Alejo Quispe.
- Juan Revollo Valencia, linguist.
- Inocencio Chambi Churata, lawyer.
- Pascual Mamani Marca, journalist.
- Ángela Callau Justiniano.
- Remigio Parijahua Villca, graduate of law.
- Javier Limachi Huañapaco, former member of the Federation of Neighborhood Councils of El Alto (FEJUVE).
- Maritza Lizarraga, lawyer.
- Marisol Cuentas Ticona.
- Raúl Alberto Aguilar Quispe, lawyer.
- José Eduardo Vargas Rivera, lawyer.
- Édgar Edwin Baltazar Mamani, lawyer and social communicator.
- Juan Patricio Quispe Mamani, heavy machinery operator.
- Rolando Julian Chambilla Mita, journalist.
- Rubén Veizaga Paricollo, candidate for ombudsman in 2016.
- Alex Espejo Guzmán, linguistics professor.
- David Mamani Torrez, lawyer.
- Jorge Condor Bolivia Ajata, candidate for member of the Supreme Electoral Tribunal in 2019.
- Favela Marisol López Soria, lawyer.
- Luis Sergio Valle Sejas, systems engineer.
- Manuel Alfredo Morales Alvarez, leader of the National Committee for the Defense of Democracy (CONADE) and candidate for ombudsman in 2016.

1 April:

- Marin Sergio Calizaya Molina, lawyer.
- Nadia Alejandra Cruz Tarifa, incumbent acting ombudsman (2019–present).
- Fernando Simón Zambrana Sea, lawyer.
- Edwin Richard Claros Zurita, candidate for ombudsman in 2016.
- Wilber Choque Cruz, former president of the Judicial Council (2012–2017).
- Heriberto Quispe Charca, agronomist.
- José Heriberto León Magne, candidate for ombudsman in 2016.
- María Hilda Luna Rojas, educator.
- Luis Gallego Condori, former member of the Chamber of Deputies from Potosí (2010–2015).
- Manuel Alejandro Sanabria Quiroz, educator and lawyer.
- Luisa Antonia Chipana Ubaras, human rights lawyer.
- Vilma Martínez Puma, Potosí departmental delegate of the Ombudsman's Office (2018–present).
- Carlos Intipampa Aliaga Terceros, theologist.
- Prosper Daniel Choque Calizaya, lawyer.
- Juan Carlos Mendoza Huanca, electrical engineer.
- Benito Sequeiros Monzón.
- Erick Abraham Sandoval.
- Anacleto Arana Ajnota, farmer.
- Luis Alfonso Vía Reque, pedagogue and philosopher.
- René Apaza Huallpa, lawyer.
- Luis Davis Apaza Callapa.
- Teófilo Ignacio Velasco, former national director of Real Rights.
- Cesar Pérez Mendoza, lawyer and professor.
- David Ticona Balboa, yatiri and candidate for ombudsman in 2016.
- Jacky Ignacia Huarachi Quispe, candidate for ombudsman in 2016.
- Rubén Julio Estrada Candia, lawyer.
- Dionisio Rivas Brito, former departmental director of the National Institute of Agrarian Reform (INRA) in 2006 and departmental director of Migration in 2009.
- Brayan Jhelmar Tintaya Laruta, lawyer and political scientist.
- Jafeth Esteban Mamani Yanarico, lawyer and professor.
- Franklin Marcelo Valdez Alarcón, candidate for member of the Plurinational Constitutional Court in 2017.
- Víctor Calamani Paco, food engineer.
- Pedro Francisco Callisaya Aro, member of the Judicial Council.
- Javier Moisés Villanueva Michel, economist.
- Saturnino Octavio Quispe Choque, construction worker and lawyer.
- Willy Eyber Chambilla Montes, systems engineer.
- Eliana Carlo Romero, business administrator.
- Lydia Apaza Quispe, candidate for ombudsman in 2016.
- Zulma Yovana Sánchez Castillo, former member of the Departmental Electoral Court of Tarija (2016–2019).
- Evelín Patricia Cossío Marquez, lawyer.
- María Eugenia Martínez, lawyer.
- Willy Rogelio Chura Chambi, lawyer.
- Claudia Helen Ramos Pacajes, lawyer.
- Humberto Echalar Flores, former vice minister of public security in 2013 and candidate for magistrate in 2017.
- Eguel Salustio Enriquez Noga, public accountant.
- Edwin Salo Calizaya Rocha, candidate for prosecutor general in 2018.
- Daniel "Chasqui" Aliaga Forgues, lawyer and candidate for member of the Supreme Electoral Tribunal in 2019.
- Ariel Serafín Gutiérrez Sánchez.
- Marcial Sangueza Dueñas, candidate for member of the Supreme Electoral Tribunal in 2016.
- Mauricio Gabriel Portugal Lavadenz, economist and lawyer.
- Javier Alejandro Blanco Flores, constitutional and human rights lawyer.
- Flora Delgado Fernández, lawyer.
- Samuel Flores Cruz, former chief curaca of the Qhara Qhara nation.
- Ruth Nelida Orihuela Ferrufino, lawyer.
- Claudia Gesik Piccirelli Jallasa, candidate for ombudsman in 2016.
- Wilma Cinthia Marani Mamani, lawyer and political scientist.
- Adolfo Soliz Antezana, former prefect of La Paz (1992–1993) and former minister of labor (1999).
- Marcelino Marco Antonio Lucero León.
- Hernán Hermes Dávalos Rengel, candidate for ombudsman in 2016.
- Roxana Emilia Gutiérrez Málaga, educational administrator.
- Nely Canqui Sarzuri, lawyer.
- Ramiro Leonardo Iquise Pally, public official in the Ombudsman's Office.
- Víctor Hugo Llanos Olmos, graduate of law.
- Daysi Natalia Ibañez Flores, lawyer.
- Tatiana Rivero Rodrigo, lawyer.
- Zenón Calani Cosso, writer.
- María Teresa Guachalla Encinas, anthropologist.
- Rimmy Calle Choquecallata, university professor.
- Juan Carlos Cáceres Saavedra, independent contractor.
- Ernesto Quispe Apaza, sculptor.
- Edgar Sandstien Zambrana, lawyer.
- Ricardo Claure Torrejón, military officer.
- Maria Teresa Villafañe Pozo, executive.
- Yobana Felipa Patzi Salazar, lawyer.
- Idelfonso Mamani Romero, former member of the Supreme Electoral Tribunal (2015–2019).
- Daniel Kirigin Zamora, graduate of law and languages.
- Estefania Yhoselin Camargo Usnay, lawyer.
- Edgar Viscarra Mayta, lawyer and professor.
- Jaime Pinto Medrano.
- Virginia Ugarte Condori, candidate for ombudsman in 2016.
- Martiniano Pizza Tito.
- Marco Antonio Loayza Cossío, lawyer.
- Olga Vásquez Huanca, lawyer.
- Jhonny Raul Apaza Tintaya, lawyer.
- María Verónica Quispe Rojas, lawyer.
- Abel Loma Rosales, lawyer.
- Edwin Walyer Morales Salinas, computer programmer.
- Judith Ines Tapia Portugal, executive secretary and social worker.
- Jesús Vera Plata, former member of FEJUVE, candidate for ombudsman in 2016, and candidate for member of the Chamber of Deputies from La Paz in 2019.
- Mabel Gimena Tamayo Villegas, public official in the Ombudsman's Office.
- Rolando Leandro Velasquez Pinto, industrial mechanic.
- Erick Rolando Alí Valencia, lawyer.
- Antonio Sanchez Aruquipa, senior technician in telecommunications and technical director in football.
- Ricardo Maldonado Aliaga, lawyer and university professor.
- Freddy Javier Urquiola Rojas, cartographer.
- Johann Ordoñez Barriga, auditor.
- Janneth Escalante Flores, lawyer.
- Jenny Iriondo Torres, education technician.
- Francisco Aruquipa Hinojosa, lawyer.
- Juana Lourdes García Guerra, economist.
- Remigio Quispe Apaza, auditor.
- Marina Vargas Sandoval, economist.
- Luis Felipe Oliva Villarroel, lawyer.
- Sixto Celio Mendoza Patty, lawyer.
- Freddy Daza Roncal, lawyer.
- Laura Encinas, teacher.
- Cicely Yuriko Goda Asebey, social communicator.
- Claudia Andrea Calvo Campos, business administrator.
- Sandra Cori Reynolds, social worker.
- Mónica Isabel Romero, candidate for ombudsman in 2016.
- Juan Pablo Usnayo Serrano, lawyer and social communicator.
- Yola Salome Aruquipa Quispe, social communicator.
- Félix Mollo Callo, civil engineer and lawyer.
- Franz Lautaro Schmidt Coaquira, environmental engineer.
- Daniel Fernando Morales Pilco, public accountant.
- Dolmia Cuentas Gonzales, agricultural technician.
- Juan Carlos Rojas Romero, mechanical engineer.
- Óscar Boris Alcon Mendez, professor.
- José Olegario Atiare Salazar, candidate for prosecutor general in 2018.
- Máximo Choque Yujra, lawyer.
- Luis Peralta Gironda, auditor.
- Carlos Dionicio Salazar Salcedo, former director of the Mining Administrative Jurisdictional Authority (AJAM) in 2011 and candidate for member of the Supreme Electoral Tribunal 2015 and for comptroller in 2016.
- Roly Claudio Velarde Cutipa, lawyer.
- Gonzalo Julian Mamani Apaza, lawyer.
- Carlos Franklin Vargas Tarqui, lawyer.
- Daniel Amado Cáceres Copa, former board member of the Unified Syndical Confederation of Rural Workers of Bolivia (CSUTCB) and candidate for member of the Supreme Electoral Tribunal in 2019.
- Marcela Adelaida Morales Avila, lawyer.
- Elizardo Nacho Rojas, lawyer.
- Eulogio Chipana Quisbert, social communicator.
- Andrea Avelina Torrez Limachi, candidate for ombudsman in 2016.
- Yamil Raul Zuñiga Callizaya, teacher.
- Nieves Gregoria Salas Lucia, social communicator.
- Magdalena Teodora Alanoca Condori, lawyer.
- Edgar Marcial Crispin Huarachi, lawyer.

Registry of applicants

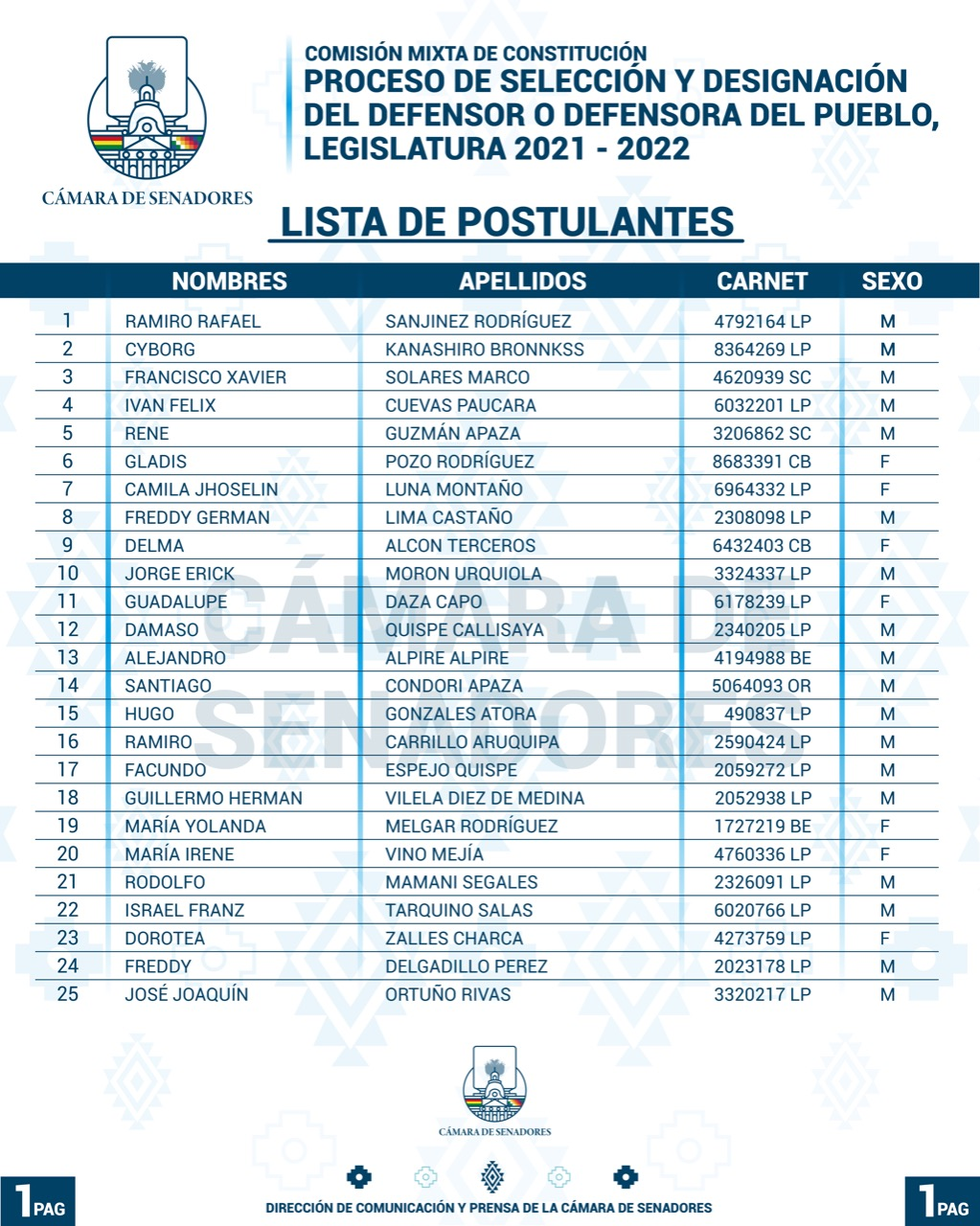
Page 01

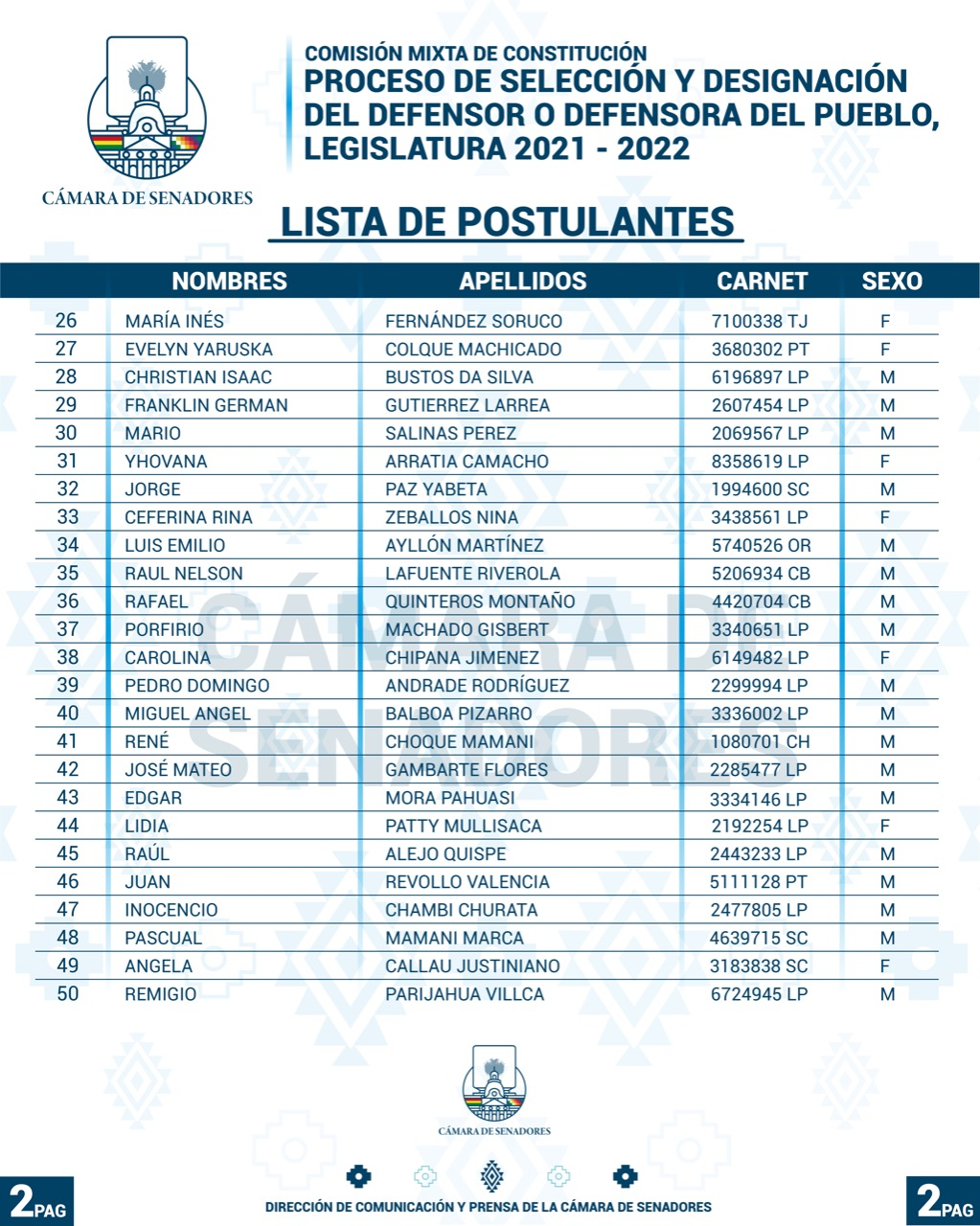
Page 02

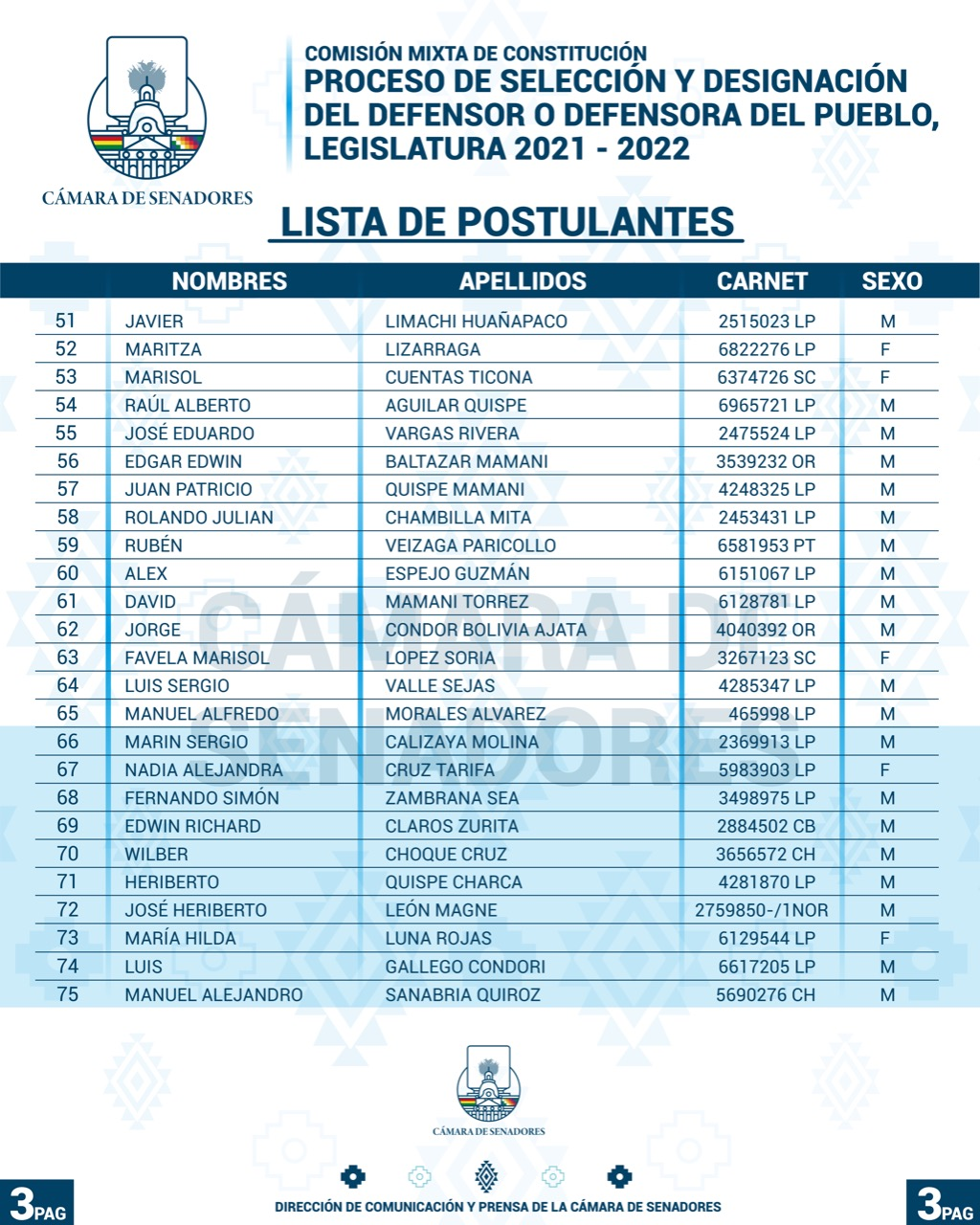
Page 03

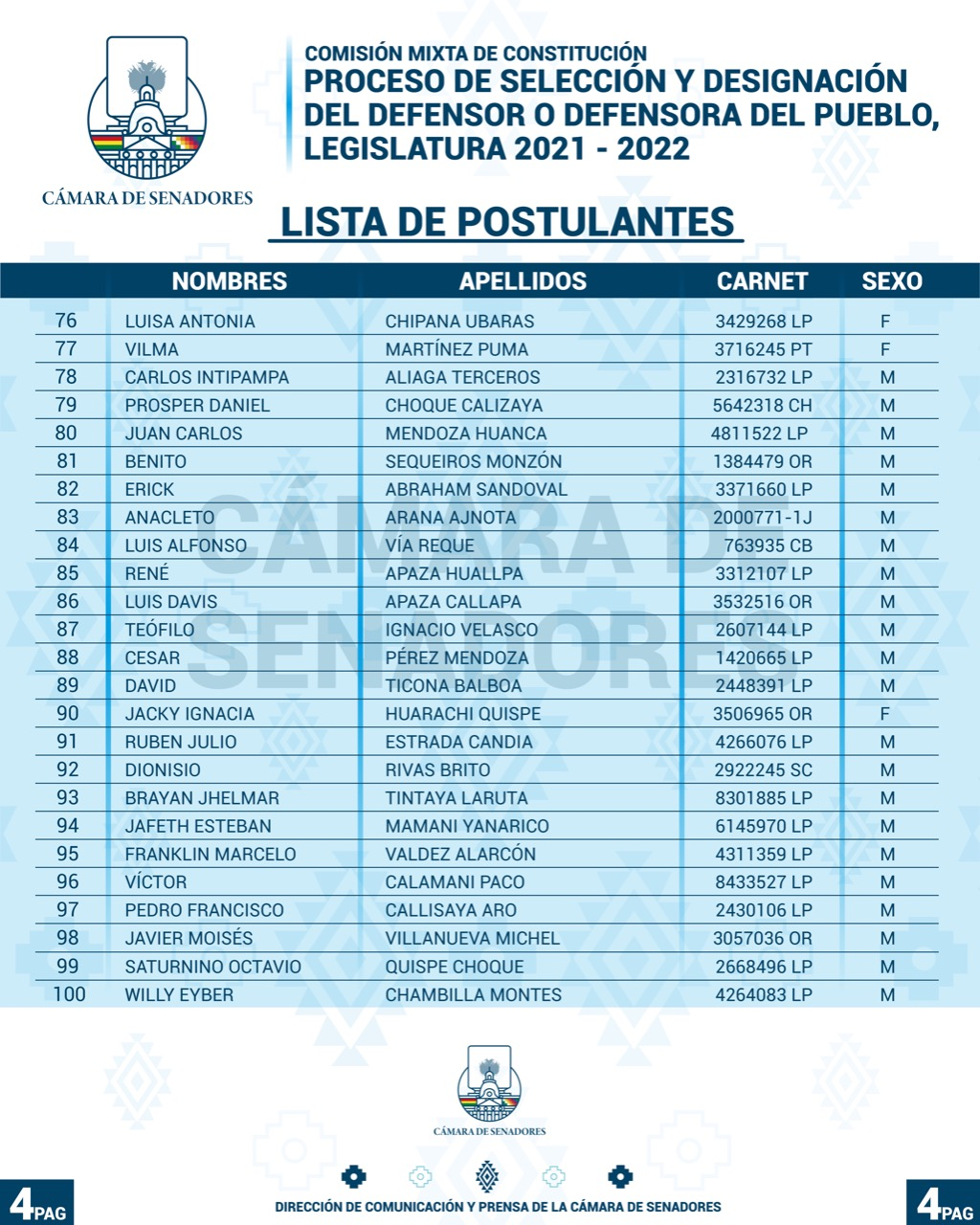
Page 04

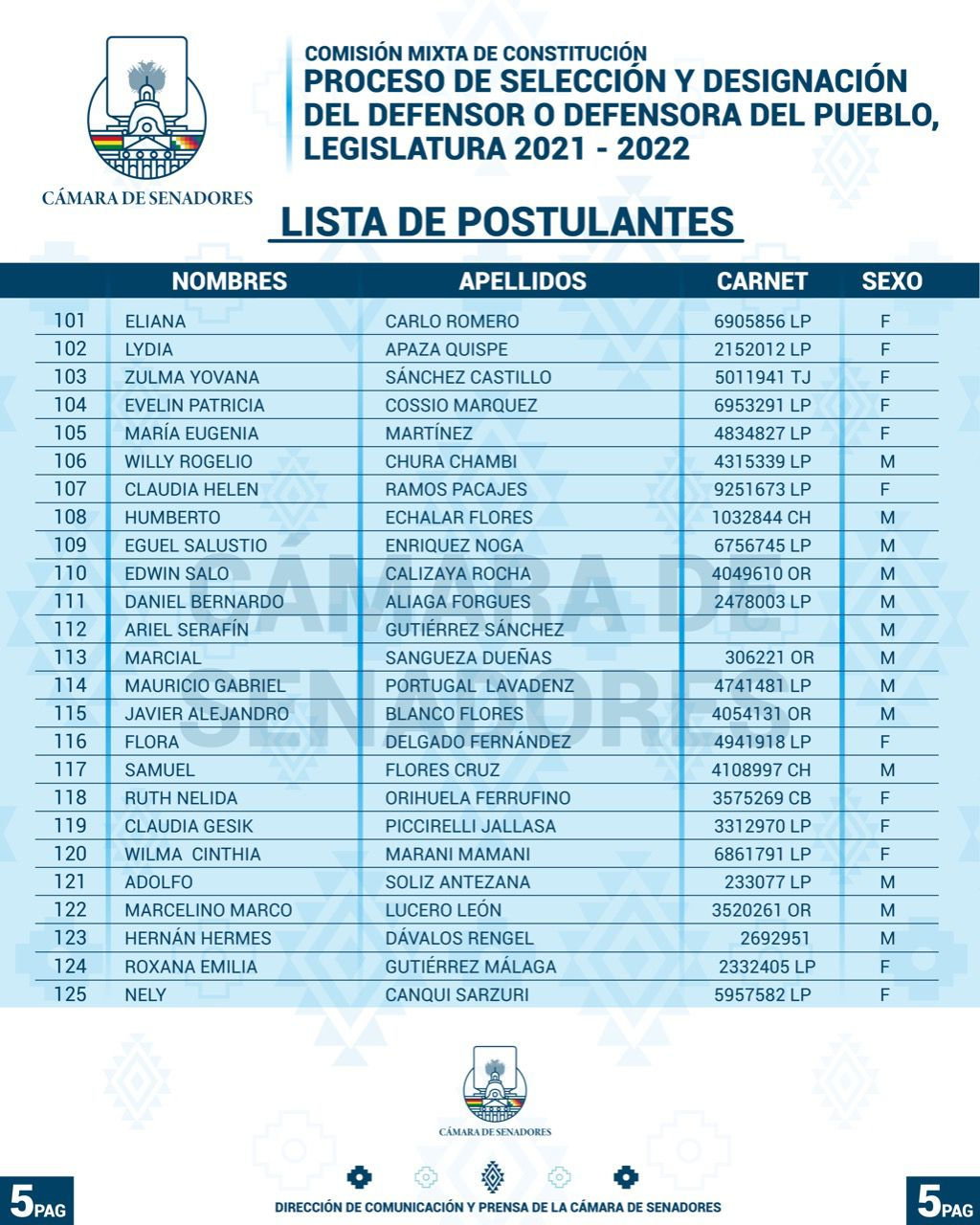
Page 05

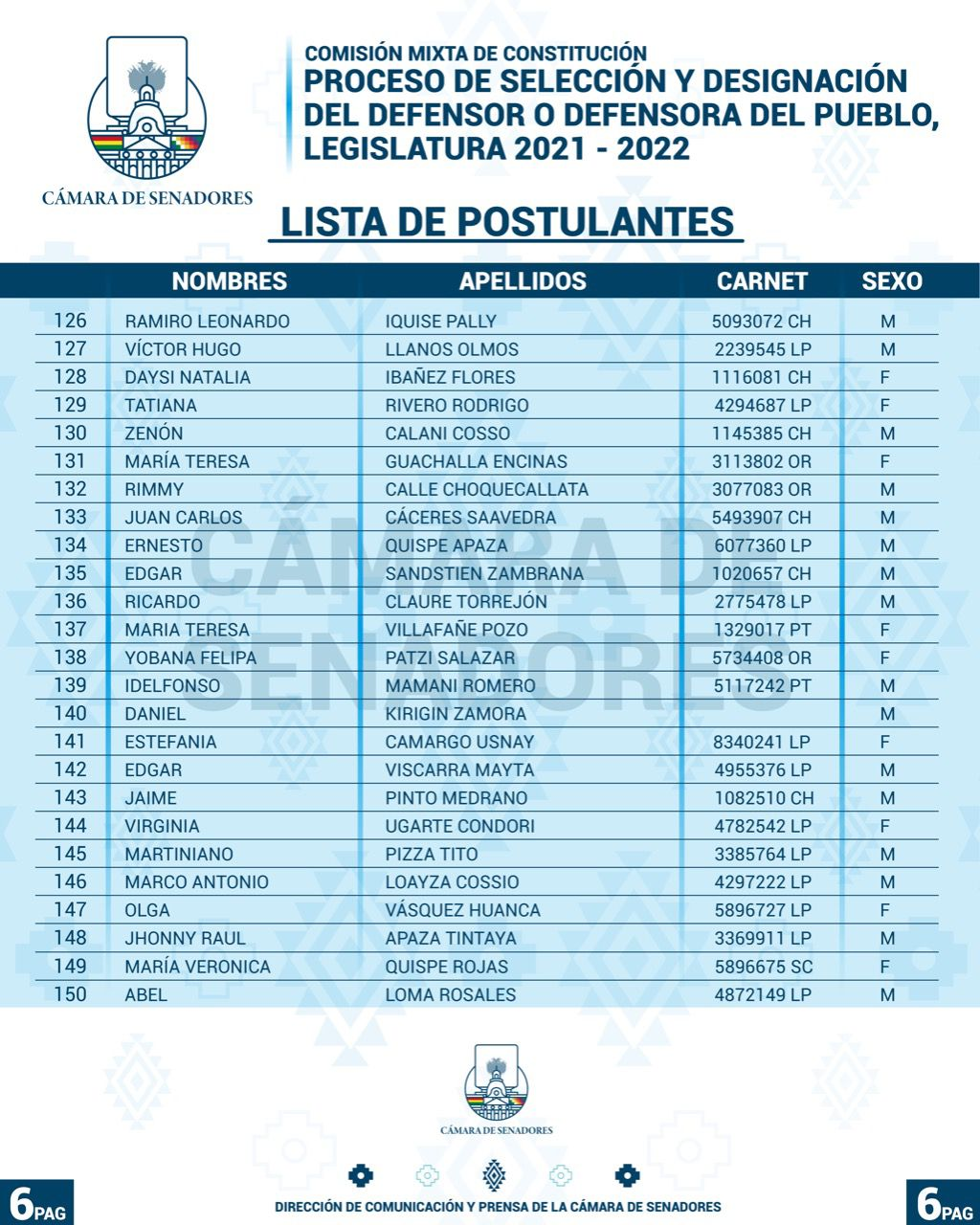
Page 06

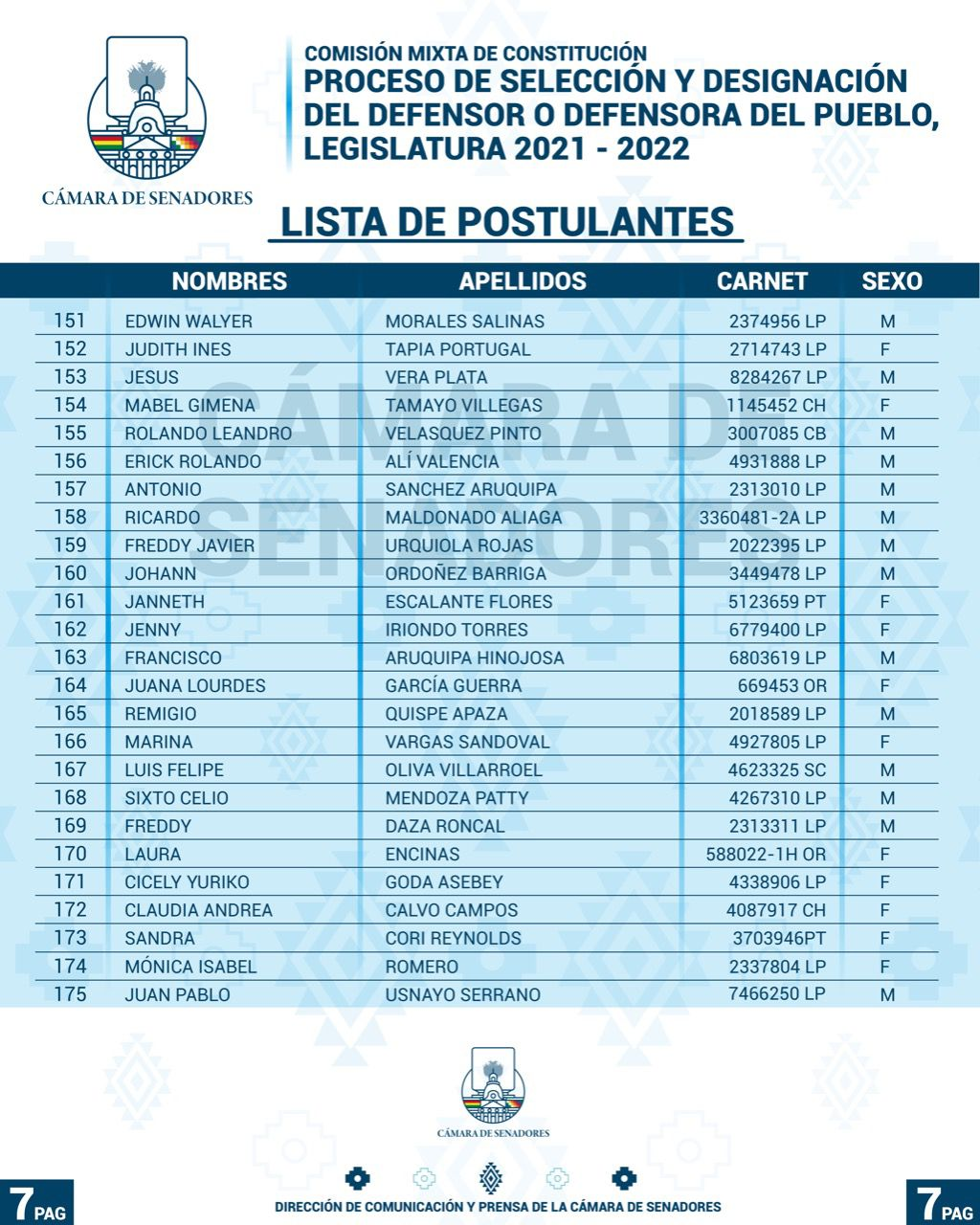
Page 07

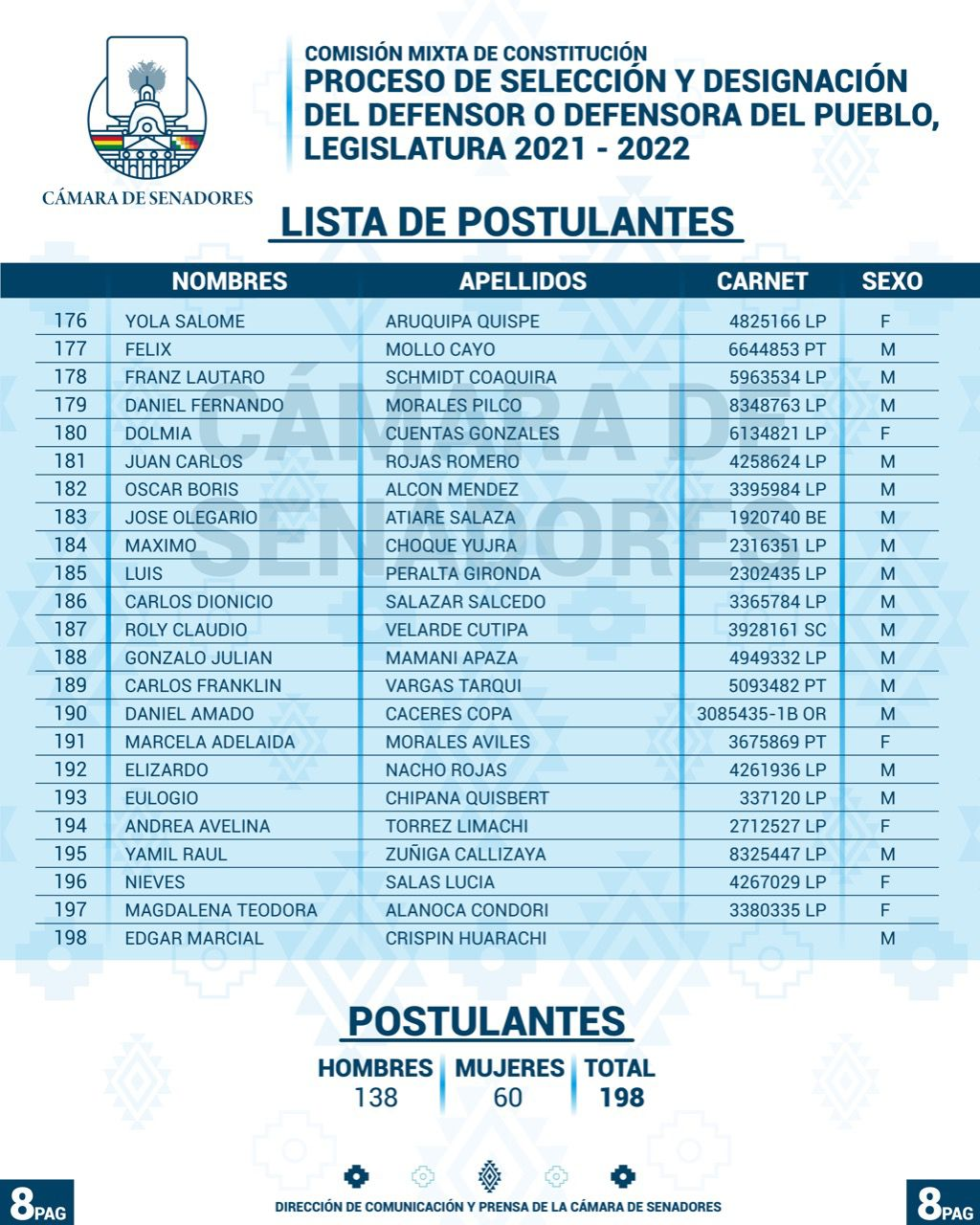
Page 08

=== Declined to run ===
The following received some speculation about a possible candidacy, but subsequently ruled themselves out:

- José María Cabrera, former State attorney general (2019–2020).
- Roberto de la Cruz, former leader of the El Alto Regional Workers' Center (COR-El Alto).
- María Galindo, leader of the Mujeres Creando collective.
- David Inca, representative of the victims of Sacaba and Senkata.

== Qualification process ==
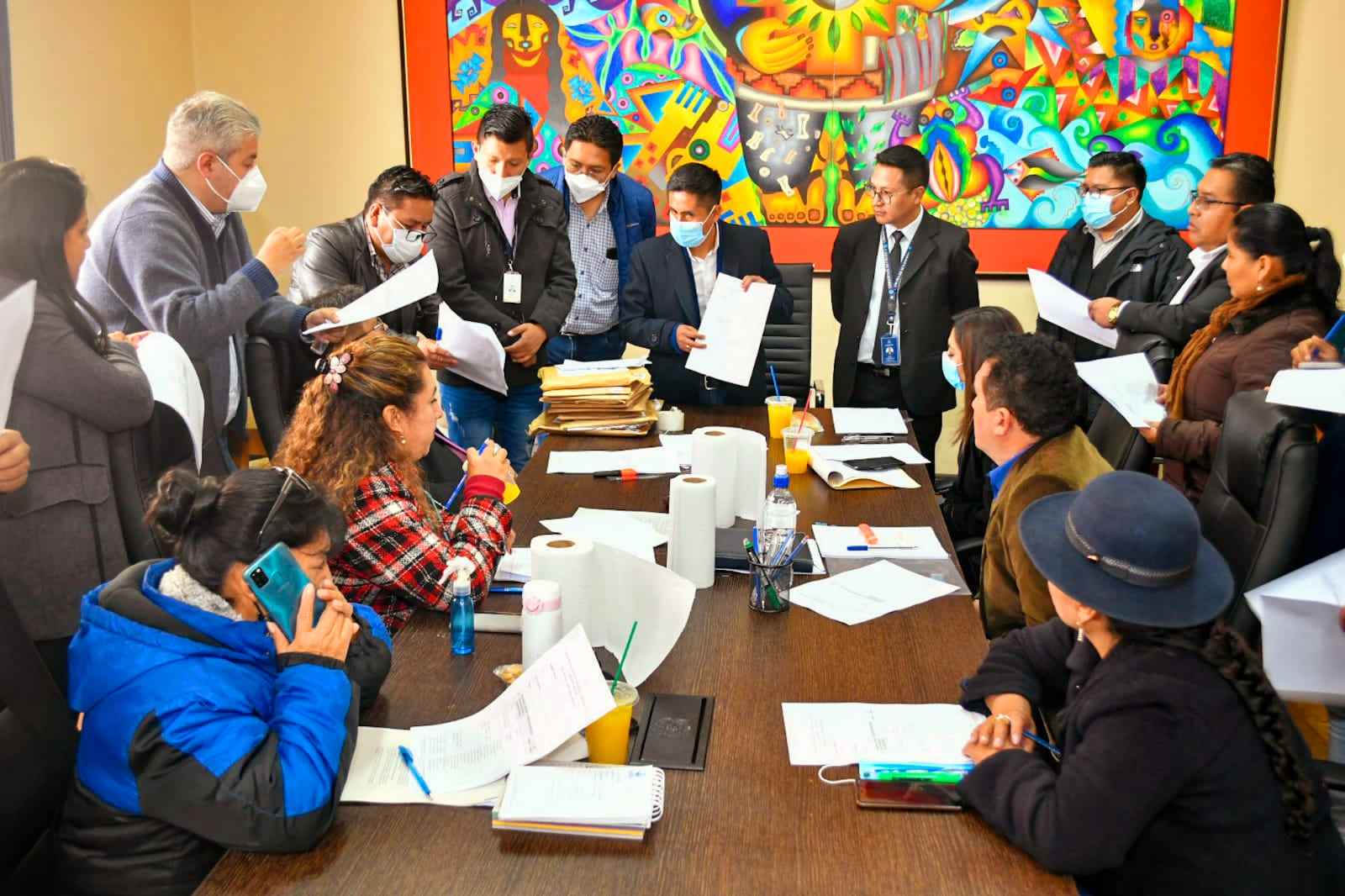
The Mixed Commission verifies applicant compliance with the eighteen requirements, 5 April 2022.

On 4 April 2022, the Mixed Legislative Commission initiated the qualification process. Commission President Rubén Gutiérrez outlined that the legislators had agreed to review fifty applications per day for six days, with the final registry of qualified candidates set to be made public on 10 April. On the first day of reviews, twenty applicants were disqualified for failing to meet any of the eighteen requirements. Twenty-five candidates moved on to the second phase, while a further five remained pending, awaiting the crossing of information on aspects such as the dual language requirement. The second day of reviews saw an acceleration in the process, with a total of ninety-five applications being analyzed. Notably, Nadia Cruz met all eighteen requirements to hold the post, and thus moved on to the second phase. In contrast, fifty-two candidacies were disqualified, including high-level names such as Lidia Patty, Manuel Morales, and Idelfonso Mamani. In the case of Jesús Vera, the Mixed Commission decided to request clarification on whether or not his political candidacy in 2019 made him ineligible, as those elections were annulled. Ultimately, Vera was disqualified due to the pending criminal proceedings against him. By the end of the process, seventy-two of the original 198 applicants were qualified to move to the second phase, of which fifty-three were men and nineteen were women.

Following the publication of the list of qualified candidates, the Mixed Commission initiated the challenge phase. Between 11 and 14 April, ineligible applicants were allowed to contest their disqualification. Likewise, outside groups could challenge the candidacies of already qualified candidates. The most significant challenge came from Civic Community, which contested Cruz's authorization on the grounds that the Constitution prohibits any former ombudsman from running again regardless of whether or not they performed their functions in an acting capacity. On 13 April, the Mixed Commission unanimously accepted CC's complaint and resolved to revoke Cruz's authorization. Cruz denounced the decision as "unfair, arbitrary, illegal, and unconstitutional" but stated that she would not file an appeal. Aside from her, CC and Creemos presented challenges against forty-one qualified candidates whom they considered to be too close to the government. By 14 April, the Mixed Commission had received a total of 133 challenges both against qualified candidates and from disqualified candidates. Seven previously qualified applicants—including Cruz—saw their candidacies revoked, while one applicant successfully appealed their disqualification. As a result, sixty-six candidates—forty-eight men and eighteen women—were approved to move to the second phase.

=== Qualified ===
The following applicants were qualified to move to the second phase:

- Alejandro Alpire Alpire.
- Lydia Apaza Quispe, candidate for ombudsman in 2016.
- ~~Jhonny Raul Apaza Tintaya, lawyer.~~ (Disqualified)
- Yhovana Arratia Camacho, local administrator.
- Jose Olegario Atiare Salaza, lawyer.
- Miguel Ángel Balboa Pizarro, systems engineer.
- Javier Alejandro Blanco Flores, constitutional and human rights lawyer.
- Juan Carlos Cáceres Saavedra, independent contractor.
- Daniel Amado Cáceres Copa, former board member of the Unified Syndical Confederation of Rural Workers of Bolivia (CSUTCB) and candidate for member of the Supreme Electoral Tribunal in 2019.
- ~~Edwin Salo Calizaya Rocha, candidate for prosecutor general in 2018.~~ (Disqualified)
- Marin Sergio Calizaya Molina, lawyer.
- Rimmy Calle Choquecallata, university professor.
- Pedro Francisco Callisaya Aro, member of the Judicial Council.
- Claudia Andrea Calvo Campos, business administrator.
- Estefania Yhoselin Camargo Usnay, lawyer.
- Inocencio Chambi Churata, lawyer.
- Luisa Antonia Chipana Ubaras, human rights lawyer.
- Wilber Choque Cruz, former president of the Judicial Council (2012–2017).
- Prosper Daniel Choque Calizaya, lawyer.
- Willy Rogelio Chura Chambi, lawyer.
- Jorge Condor Bolivia Ajata, candidate for member of the Supreme Electoral Tribunal in 2019.
- Evelín Patricia Cossío Marquez, lawyer.
- Santiago Condori Apaza, anthropologist. (Note: Qualified upon appeal.)
- ~~Nadia Alejandra Cruz Tarifa, incumbent acting ombudsman (2019–present).~~ (Disqualified)
- Marisol Cuentas Ticona.
- Iván Félix Cuevas Paucara, candidate for ombudsman in 2016.
- Hernán Hermes Dávalos Rengel, candidate for ombudsman in 2016.
- Guadalupe Daza Capo, former member of the Federation of Neighborhood Councils of El Alto (FEJUVE).
- Freddy Delgadillo Pérez, philosopher.
- Humberto Echalar Flores, former vice minister of public security in 2013 and candidate for magistrate in 2017.
- Rubén Julio Estrada Candia, lawyer.
- ~~Luis Gallego Condori, former member of the Chamber of Deputies from Potosí (2010–2015).~~ (Disqualified)
- ~~Ariel Serafín Gutiérrez Sánchez.~~ (Disqualified)
- Ramiro Leonardo Iquise Pally, public official in the Ombudsman's Office.
- Freddy Germán Lima Castaño, lawyer.
- Javier Limachi Huañapaco, former member of the Federation of Neighborhood Councils of El Alto (FEJUVE).
- Maritza Lizarraga, lawyer.
- ~~Víctor Hugo Llanos Olmos, graduate of law.~~ (Disqualified)
- Marco Antonio Loayza Cossío, lawyer.
- Abel Loma Rosales, lawyer.
- Favela Marisol López Soria, lawyer.
- Marcelino Marco Antonio Lucero León.
- María Hilda Luna Rojas, educator.
- Porfirio Machado Gisbert, candidate for member of the Supreme Electoral Tribunal in 2019.
- Pascual Mamani Marca, journalist.
- Jafeth Esteban Mamani Yanarico, lawyer and professor.
- Gonzalo Julian Mamani Apaza, lawyer.
- Sixto Celio Mendoza Patty, lawyer.
- Jorge Erick Morón Urquiola, lawyer.
- José Joaquín Ortuño Rivas, social communicator.
- Luis Peralta Gironda, auditor.
- Cesar Pérez Mendoza, lawyer and professor.
- Jaime Pinto Medrano.
- Gladis Pozo Rodríguez, lawyer.
- Rafael Quinteros Montaño, candidate for ombudsman in 2016.
- Juan Patricio Quispe Mamani, heavy machinery operator.
- Claudia Helen Ramos Pacajes, lawyer.
- Juan Revollo Valencia, linguist.
- Nieves Gregoria Salas Lucia, social communicator.
- Carlos Dionicio Salazar Salcedo, former director of the Mining Administrative Jurisdictional Authority (AJAM) in 2011 and candidate for member of the Supreme Electoral Tribunal 2015 and for comptroller in 2016.
- Mario Salinas Pérez, industrial engineer.
- Manuel Alejandro Sanabria Quiroz, educator and lawyer.
- Zulma Yovana Sánchez Castillo, former member of the Departmental Electoral Court of Tarija (2016–2019).
- Antonio Sanchez Aruquipa, senior technician in telecommunications and technical director in football.
- ~~Marcial Sangueza Dueñas, candidate for member of the Supreme Electoral Tribunal in 2016.~~ (Disqualified)
- Adolfo Soliz Antezana, former prefect of La Paz (1992–1993) and former minister of labor (1999).
- Mabel Gimena Tamayo Villegas, public official in the Ombudsman's Office.
- Israel Franz Tarquino Salas, cultural manager, poet, and teacher.
- Franklin Marcelo Valdez Alarcón, candidate for member of the Plurinational Constitutional Court in 2017.
- Luis Sergio Valle Sejas, systems engineer.
- Marina Vargas Sandoval, economist.
- Guillermo Hernán Vilela Díez de Medina, candidate for ombudsman in 2016.
- María Irene Vino Mejía, candidate for member of the Judicial Council in 2021.

== Evaluation phase ==
=== Evaluation of merits ===
Between 18 and 22 April, the sixty-six qualifying candidates were subjected to an evaluation of merits. Those who met at least six of the ten criteria were approved to move to the interview phase. Among the evaluated criteria were professional experience in the promotion and defense of human rights, publications and research on human rights, postgraduate degrees or specialties in human rights, and actions to support vulnerable sectors of society. After four days, the Mixed Commission reported that sixteen or the original sixty-six candidates had been approved; twelve men and four women.

==== Qualified ====
The following applicants were qualified to move to the interview phase:

- Lydia Apaza Quispe, candidate for ombudsman in 2016.
- Rimmy Calle Choquecallata, university professor.
- Pedro Francisco Callisaya Aro, member of the Judicial Council.
- Claudia Andrea Calvo Campos, business administrator.
- Luisa Antonia Chipana Ubaras, human rights lawyer.
- Wilber Choque Cruz, former president of the Judicial Council (2012–2017).
- Santiago Condori Apaza, anthropologist.
- Evelín Patricia Cossío Marquez, lawyer.
- Rubén Julio Estrada Candia, lawyer.
- Ramiro Leonardo Iquise Pally, public official in the Ombudsman's Office.
- Marco Antonio Loayza Cossío, lawyer.
- Marcelino Marco Antonio Lucero León.
- Porfirio Machado Gisbert, candidate for member of the Supreme Electoral Tribunal in 2019.
- Jafeth Esteban Mamani Yanarico, lawyer and professor.
- Juan Patricio Quispe Mamani, heavy machinery operator.
- Juan Revollo Valencia, linguist.

=== Interviews ===
The sixteen remaining candidates moved on to face-to-face interviews with the members of the Mixed Commission. Ninety questions were asked—pre-approved by the Mixed Commission and reviewed by the Executive Committee of the Bolivian University—referring to the interviewee's knowledge on the Political Constitution of the State, the American Convention on Human Rights, the Universal Declaration of Human Rights, and the United Nations Declaration on the Rights of Indigenous Peoples. Between 26 and 27 April, seven candidates—four men and three women—were authorized as candidates to be voted on by the entire Legislative Assembly. On the first day of interviews, four applicants were approved: Pedro Callisaya, Andrea Calvo, Antonia Chipana, and Evelín Cossío; while on the second day, Rubén Julio Estrada, Leonardo Iquise, and Porfirio Machado were approved.

The final report by the Mixed Commission was approved on 28 April. Notably, only the MAS and one opposition deputy—Sergio Maniguary of Creemos—signed the document. CC refused to support the final list, accusing the MAS of having "broken the consensus" by disqualifying Marco Antonio Loayza and Marco Antonio Lucero despite the fact that they met the requirements for the position. The Citizen Observation of Democracy (OCD), an observer in the pre-selection process, noted that the vagueness of the qualification parameters meant that the final list of candidates was largely chosen based on the personal discretion of the members of the Mixed Commission.

=== Final candidates ===
The following applicants were qualified as the final candidates for ombudsman of Bolivia:

- Pedro Francisco Callisaya Aro, member of the Judicial Council.
- Claudia Andrea Calvo Campos, business administrator.
- Luisa Antonia Chipana Ubaras, human rights lawyer.
- Evelín Patricia Cossío Marquez, lawyer.
- Rubén Julio Estrada Candia, lawyer.
- Ramiro Leonardo Iquise Pally, public official in the Ombudsman's Office.
- Porfirio Machado Gisbert, candidate for member of the Supreme Electoral Tribunal in 2019.
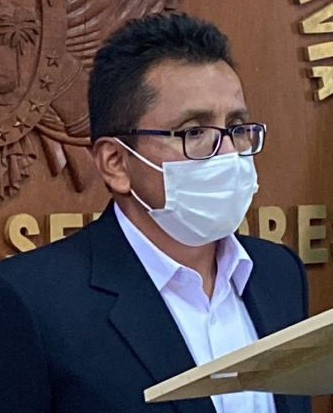
Pedro Callisaya
from Murillo Province

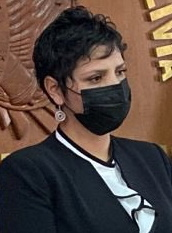
Andrea Calvo
from Oropeza Province

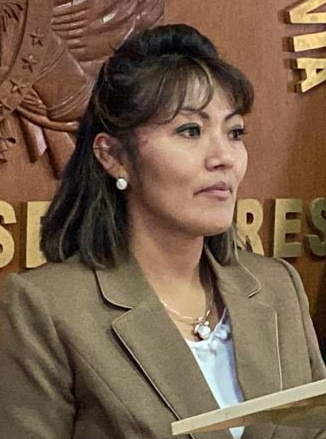
Antonia Chipana
from Cercado Province

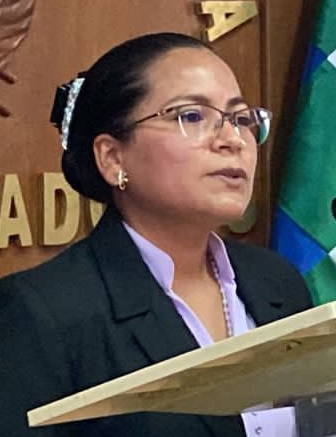
Evelín Cossío
from Sud Yungas Province

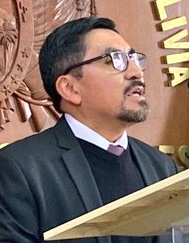
Julio Estrada
from Murillo Province

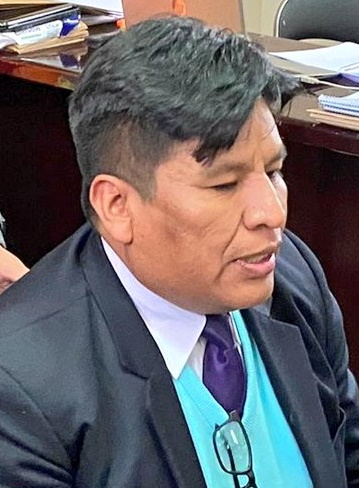
Leonardo Iquise
from Omiste Province

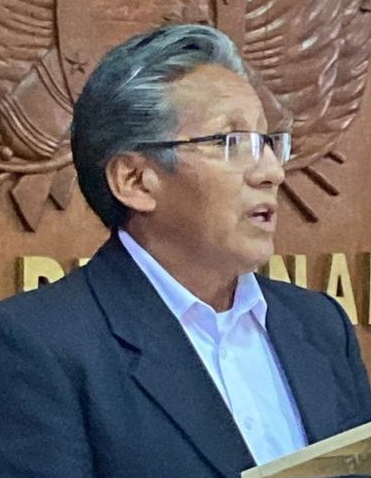
Porfirio Machado
from Murillo Province

== Legislative election ==
As the Mixed Commission prepared to deliver its final report to the Legislative Assembly, both CC and Creemos announced that they would veto the election of any candidates viewed as too close to the government, thus denying the MAS two-thirds of the vote. Without opposition support, the MAS was fourteen seats shy of reaching the necessary votes to elect its preferred candidate. Even with the added support of the six known opposition dissidents, the MAS still needed at least eight parliamentarians to break ranks with their caucuses. Given this, MAS Deputy Juan José Jauregui stated that his party would seek to gain support from the "democratic wing" of both opposition forces. If all else failed, Commission President Rubén Gutiérrez did not rule out attempting to elect a consensus candidate. Seeking to reach an agreement, Vice President Choquehuaca convened a meeting of caucus leaders on 4 May. Both CC and Creemos boycotted the meeting, with Creemos Senator Centa Rek stating that it was "unnecessary" given the opposition's "clear position" on the matter.

=== First session ===
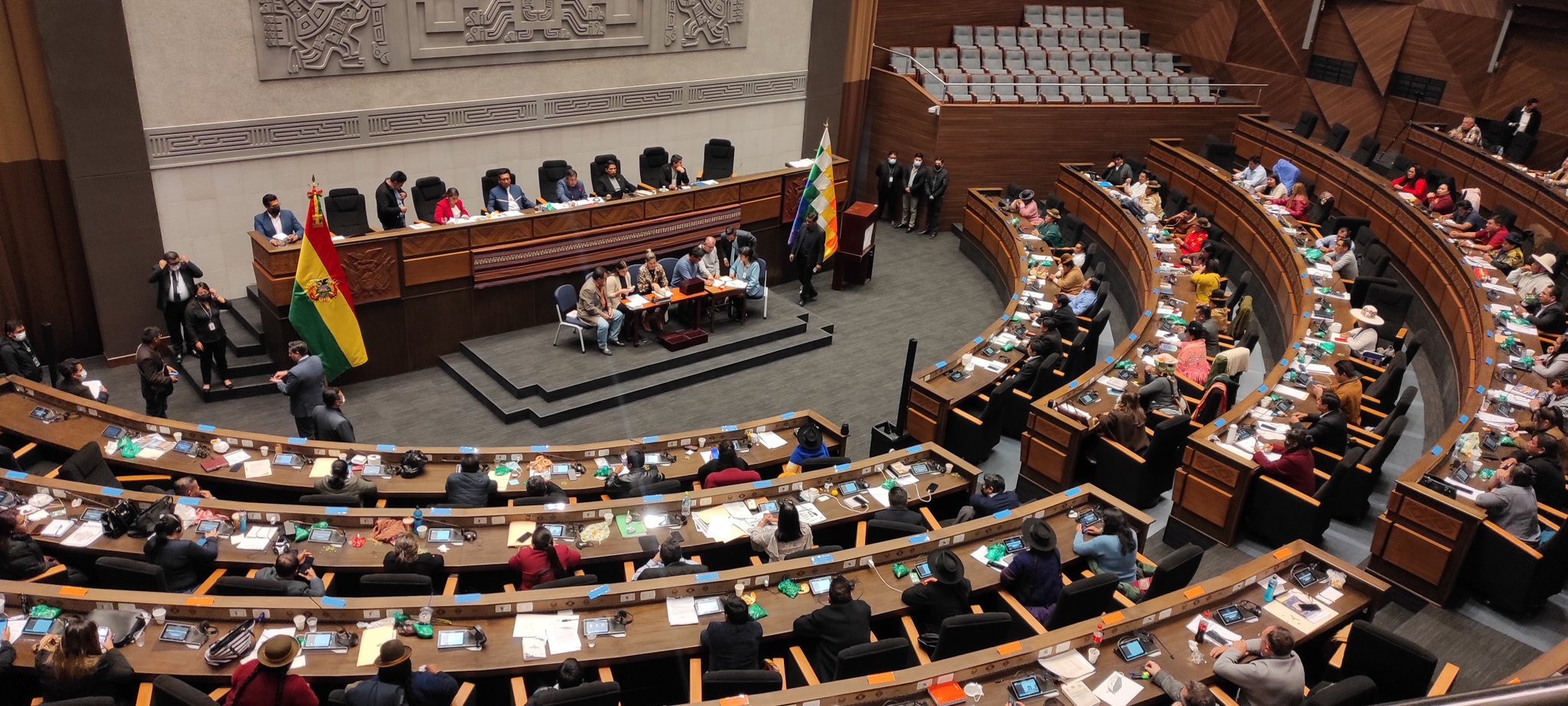
Parliamentarians convene in a legislative session to elect a new ombudsman, 5 May 2022.

The legislative session to elect a new ombudsman was convened shortly after 9 a.m. on 5 May. In their statements, legislators from Creemos and CC outlined their opposition to the vote. Deputy Marioly Morón called the election "fraudulent [because] all the applicants that remained are from the MAS", while Deputy Enrique Urquidi noted that "a political line and decision distorted the work we did". Notably, some MAS legislators also objected to the presence of some candidates, including Deputy Gladys Quispe, who accused Evelín Cossío of being an "accomplice in the coup d'état" and not speaking "one iota" of Aymara.

At 4:35 p.m., after several hours of debate, legislators began the voting process. In previous legislative elections, assembly members were traditionally handed blank sheets of paper on which they would write the name of their preferred candidate before being called to the front of the hemicycle to cast their vote. This time, the process was changed, and legislators were individually called to the front of the hemicycle, where six officiating parliamentarians handed them a blank sheet and an envelope. The voting legislator was then directed to a "dark room" where they could anonymously cast their vote. Choquehuaca noted that this process was decided by those who attended the meeting called the previous day; that is to say, the MAS.

In the first round of voting, the MAS failed to reach the necessary two-thirds to elect a new ombudsman. After all ballots were counted, Pedro Callisaya emerged with the majority of the votes at sixty-five. He was followed by Evelín Cossío with forty-six votes and Porfirio Machado with thirty. Two other candidates received a combined four votes while eighteen legislators left their ballots blank and one other invalidated his. As such, no candidate received the necessary 109 votes to achieve two-thirds. (Note: Two deputies were absent from the session, meaning that only 109 votes were necessary to achieve the support of two-thirds of the 164 present. That is one less vote than what would have been required if all 166 legislators were present.) The legislature's inability to reach consensus continued into the second round with both Callisaya and Cossío increasing in their vote share but nonetheless failing to reach two-thirds. By that point, as the more than twelve hour session dragged on into the morning of 6 May, Choquehuanca determined to intermediately suspend vote, to be resumed on a later date. Until then, both opposition caucuses initiated a vigil in La Paz to avoid the reinstallation of the session without their presence, a tactic previously employed by the ruling party.

Candidate	Party	First round		Second round	
Candidate	Party	Votes	%	Votes	%
Pedro Callisaya	Nonpartisan	65	39.63	82	50.00
Evelín Cossío	Nonpartisan	46	28.05	47	28.66
Porfirio Machado	Nonpartisan	30	18.29	11	6.71
Antonia Chipana	Nonpartisan	0	0.00	1	0.61
Julio Estrada	Nonpartisan	2	1.22		
Andrea Calvo	Nonpartisan	2	1.22		
Valid votes		145	88.41	141	85.98
Invalid/blank votes		19	11.59	23	14.02
Total votes		164	100.00	164	100.00

=== Intermission and debate ===
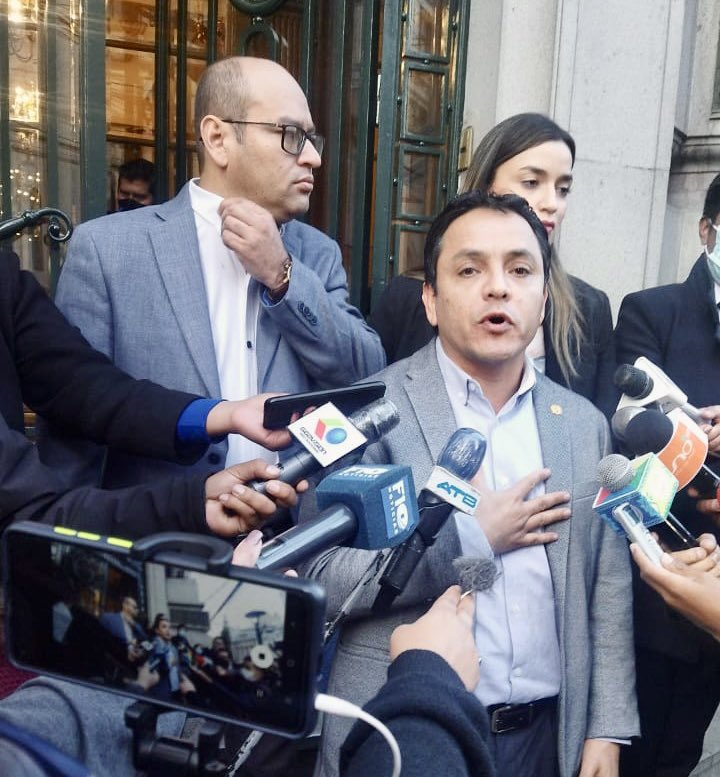
Creemos demanded that the process be started from scratch.

Though unable to reach consensus, CC nonetheless celebrated its success in blocking a unilateral decision on the part of the MAS. Following the vote, Deputy Carlos Alarcón announced that the CC caucus had chosen Cossío as its candidate of choice. Likewise, he stated that the coalition would not support Callisaya as he was the ruling party's preferred candidate. Neither, however, would CC opt for the blank or null vote, "because it would be a vote in favor of Nadia Cruz; there must be a new ombudsman". For her part, Cossío considered it likely that Deputy Quispe's accusations against her prior to the vote had motived the CC caucus to support her candidacy. In contrast to CC's position, Creemos maintained its lack of confidence in any of the seven finalists, considering the process "tainted from the start". Therefore, the coalition announced its intention to nullify its vote in any subsequent cessions until the entire process was started from scratch.

On the other hand, analysts also noted a fracture in the MAS between those ruling party legislators who supported Callisaya and those who voted for Machado. Per sources consulted by Página Siete, the discrepancy related to a broader fracture in the party between supporters of MAS leader and former president Evo Morales and incumbent president Luis Arce, with Machado toeing the line of the Evistas while Callisaya was more aligned with the current government. CC Senator Nely Gallo noted that in the recess preceding the second vote, MAS parliamentarians were observed attempting to convince one another to vote for their preferred candidate. By the second round, most of the MAS caucus coalesced around Callisaya, though not entirely. In that sense, political scientist Manfredo Bravo pointed out that Arce held the advantage due to his incumbency. For his part, MAS Deputy Ramiro Venegas assured that the divided vote only meant that legislators held "different perspectives ... that does not mean a fracture in the MAS". Following a series of internal meetings, Gutiérrez announced that the MAS had settled on Callisaya as its candidate of choice.

Amid the inability of either the ruling party or the opposition to reach an agreement, the Ombudsman's Office faced an imminent crisis. Cruz's interim mandate had exceeded its prescribed period by such an extent that Tezanos Pinto's original six-year term was set to expire on 14 May. Per Article 12 of Law N° 870 regulating the Ombudsman's Office, the incumbent authority shall cease functions following the fulfillment of their mandate. Given this, the MAS analyzed a series of alternatives to replace Cruz. The only viable option prescribed by law was to appoint a deputy ombudsman to be the acting authority, as had occurred with Cruz in 2019. In that sense, Daniel Ramírez, deputy for the promotion and dissemination of human rights, was the only incumbent deputy ombudsman. Ultimately, however, the MAS decided to extend Cruz's mandate, relying on an interpretation of the regulations that allowed for the acting ombudsman to remain in office until the appointment of a new official. The opposition rejected that justification as unconstitutional, with Alarcón stating that Cruz's continuation in office constituted a usurpation of functions.

=== Second session ===
After an eleven-day intermission, Choquehuanca reconvened the legislative session on 16 May. For the third time, no candidate achieved the necessary two-thirds. Of the 161 legislators present, ninety-two voted for Callisaya, ten more than previously but fifteen short of a supermajority. (Note: Five deputies were absent from the session, meaning that only 107 votes were necessary to achieve the support of two-thirds of the 161 present. That is three less votes than what would have been required if all 166 legislators were present.) Likewise, Cossío attainted forty-five votes, a reduction of two votes compared to the second round. However, Machado saw the largest reduction in support, receiving just two votes, nine less than he had previously achieved. In contrast, Antonia Chipana rose to third place, though with only four votes. Furthermore, in line with Creemos' position, fifteen legislators left their ballots blank, and three nullified theirs. Following the vote, Choquehuanca suspended the session, convening a meeting between the heads of the three caucuses to evaluate the situation and hopefully reach a consensus. However, the talks ended in failure after Creemos abandoned the meeting; the coalition had unsuccessfully sought for three of its delegates to attend rather than the agree-upon two. Rather than continue the dialogue without them, Choquehuanca opted to suspend the meeting, a decision supported by CC.

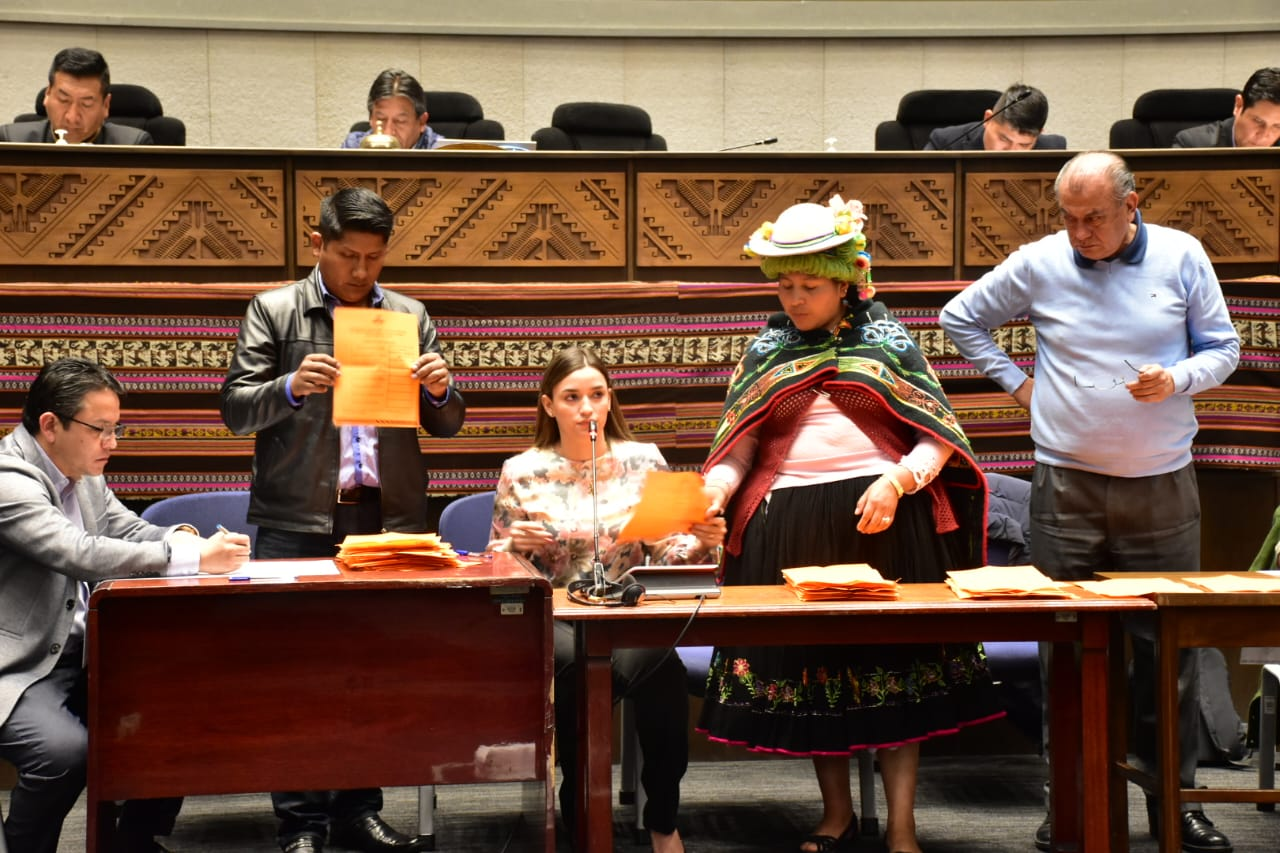
A bipartisan board of legislators tally the results of the third round, 16 May 2022.

Candidate	Party	Votes	%
Pedro Callisaya	Nonpartisan	92	57.14
Evelín Cossío	Nonpartisan	45	27.95
Antonia Chipana	Nonpartisan	4	2.48
Porfirio Machado	Nonpartisan	2	1.24
Valid votes		143	88.82
Invalid/blank votes		18	11.18
Total votes		161	100.00

=== Third session ===
The legislature reconvened for a third time on 18 May, two days after its previous attempt at resolving the issue. Once again, the process culminated in the failure to elect a new authority, with the three caucuses entrenching themselves in their respective positions. The MAS fully coalesced around Callisaya, granting him ninety-nine votes, while forty-seven CC legislators submitted ballots in favor of Cossío, an incremental yet unsubstantial increase for both candidates. Conversely, support for Chipana decreased by two while all sixteen Creemos senators and deputies left their ballots blank. With this impasse in mind, Deputy Arispe submitted a motion to postpone the election to a future session—with no scheduled date or time—justifying that the multiple unsuccessful attempts were hindering the legislature's law-making duties. The motion was supported and passed by a majority vote of the MAS caucus.

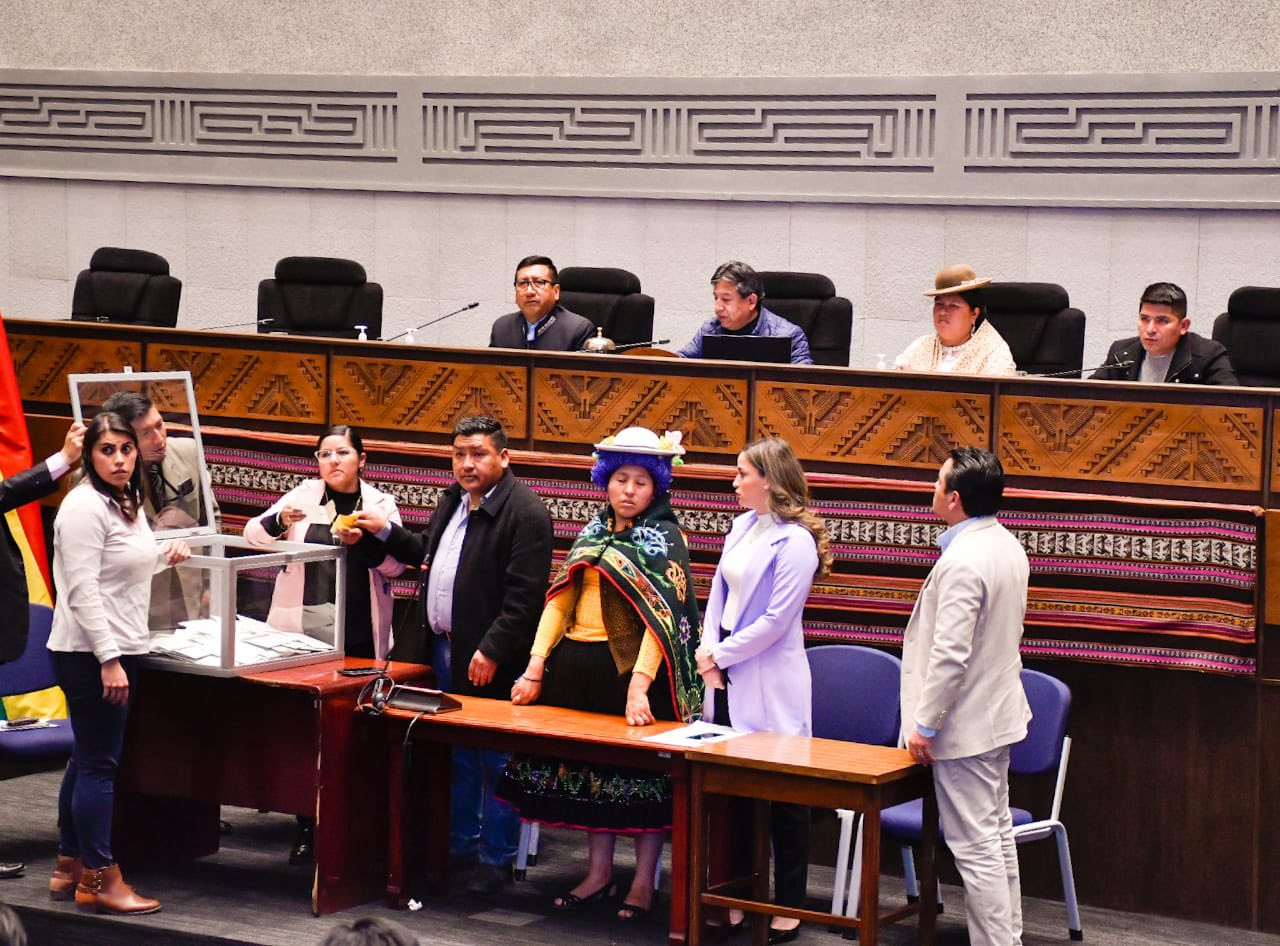
Senator Andrea Barrientos (CC) casts her vote during the legislature's fourth attempt to elect a new ombudsman, 18 May 2022.

Candidate	Party	Votes	%
Pedro Callisaya	Nonpartisan	99	60.37
Evelín Cossío	Nonpartisan	47	28.66
Antonia Chipana	Nonpartisan	2	1.22
Valid votes		148	90.24
Invalid/blank votes		16	9.76
Total votes		164	100.00

=== Interlude and fourth session ===
With the process paralyzed, the legislature moved on to other tasks. The issue of electing a new ombudsman remained largely untouched for two months, at which point the conflict flared up again in the wake of a controversial ruling by the Fourth Constitutional Chamber of La Paz. On 15 July, the court issued Resolution 178/2022, which ruled that: "If the Legislative Assembly does not fulfill [its] task ... and is hindered in a constant, repetitive manner for a period of time that exceeds ... seventy days, under a criterion of rationality, coordination and cooperation of powers must be sought, including going to the other power such as the executive branch". In effect, the court's decision granted President Arce the power to unilaterally designate a new ombudsman should the legislature fail to do so.

The ruling prompted an uproar from the opposition, with CC's leader, Carlos Mesa, denouncing it as a legislative coup "annulling the powers of the Legislative Assembly". In an official complaint, CC denounced that "with this resolution, the constitutional, republican, and democratic system recognized ... [by] the Constitution is broken; the current president becomes an emperor who will decide for himself and before himself, ignoring the powers that correspond to the legislative body". The opposition also expressed concern over the fact that the ruling could be applied to other authorities, including the comptroller general, high judges and prosecutors, and even members of the country's highest electoral, judicial, and constitutional tribunals, whose terms were set to expire in 2023. Even members of the ruling party expressed disquietude over the court's decision, with Freddy Mamani, president of the Chamber of Deputies, considering it incorrect for the president to designate the ombudsman, while Cruz assured that the Constitution made it clear that "only the legislative body ... can generate the appointment".

The court's unexpected ruling spurred the Legislative Assembly back into action, and in late July, Choquehuanca announced that another vote would be held on the topic. The session, however, was not formally convened until the first day of September, a full three months after the previous vote took place. For journalist Pablo Peralta, the hope of the MAS was that the court's ruling would pressure the opposition into finally settling the matter through the legislature. Senators Gutiérrez and Leonardo Loza both alluded to this, with the latter stating that "if [two-thirds] is not achieved, [the constitutional ruling] will be evaluated". These hopes were quickly dashed, however, and for the fifth time in a row, none of the candidates reached the necessary threshold. Callisaya dropped to ninety-seven votes, Cossío to forty-four, Calvo received one, Creemos cast fifteen blank votes, and two ballots were annulled. (Note: Only 107 votes were necessary to achieve the support of two-thirds of the 159 present. That is three less vote than what would have been required if all 166 legislators were present.)

Candidate	Party	Votes	%
Pedro Callisaya	Nonpartisan	97	61.01
Evelín Cossío	Nonpartisan	44	27.67
Andrea Calvo	Nonpartisan	1	0.63
Valid votes		142	89.31
Invalid/blank votes		17	10.69
Total votes		159	100.00

=== Fifth session ===
Final session to elect a new ombudsman
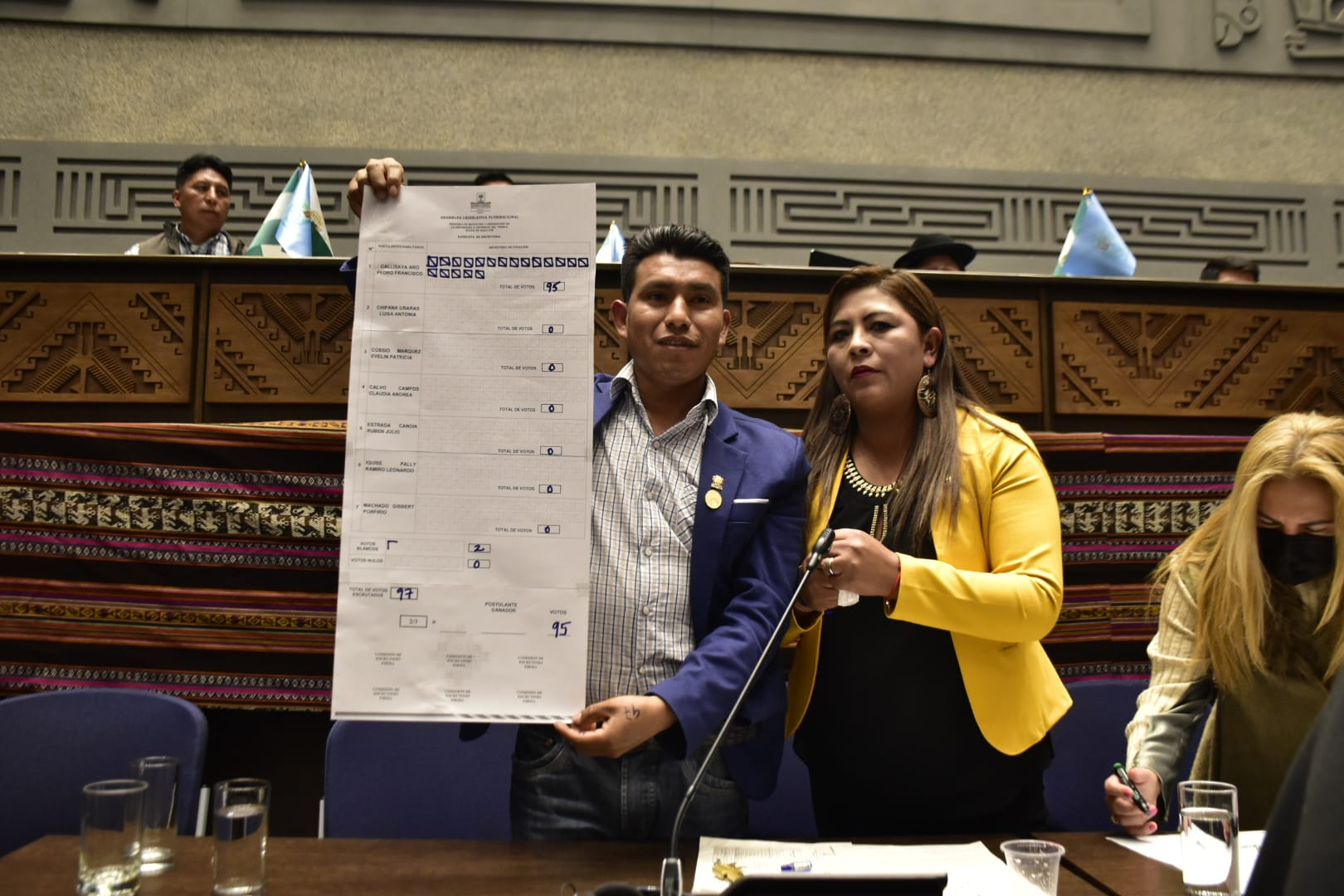
- In a chaotic session, the MAS elected Pedro Callisaya in a vote the opposition denounced as rigged.
- Protestas de la oposición en la Asamblea, puesto que el MAS pretende hacer una votación para Defensor del Pueblo
- La elección del nuevo Defensor del Pueblo ha generado reclamos desde la oposición

Faced with five failed votes and the effective impossibility of reaching an agreement, the MAS resorted to unilaterally designating the new ombudsman. On the morning of 23 September, during a session originally convened to deal with two bills, Deputy Jauregui proposed a last-minute modification to the legislature's agenda, changing the order of the day to include another vote. The move took advantage of the fact that thirty-two opposition parliamentarians were on leave at the time, most having traveled to attend the events commemorating Santa Cruz's 212th anniversary. In an environment of shouts and physical altercations, and with only 121 parliamentarians present, the MAS elected Pedro Callisaya as the country's next ombudsman. Callisaya attained ninety-five votes, representing ninety-seven percent of the votes cast but just fifty-eight percent of what would have been required if all 166 legislators had been present; those in the opposition who were in attendance boycotted the vote. The opposition lambasted the result as "rigged" and accused the government of having "mortally wounded democracy" by perpetrating a "coup against parliament". In a later press conference, Freddy Mamani, for his part, declared: "mission accomplished".

Candidate	Party	Votes	%
Pedro Callisaya	Nonpartisan	95	97.94
Valid votes		95	97.94
Invalid/blank votes		2	2.06
Total votes		97	100.00
