= Luis Gallego =

Bolivian politician (born 1968)

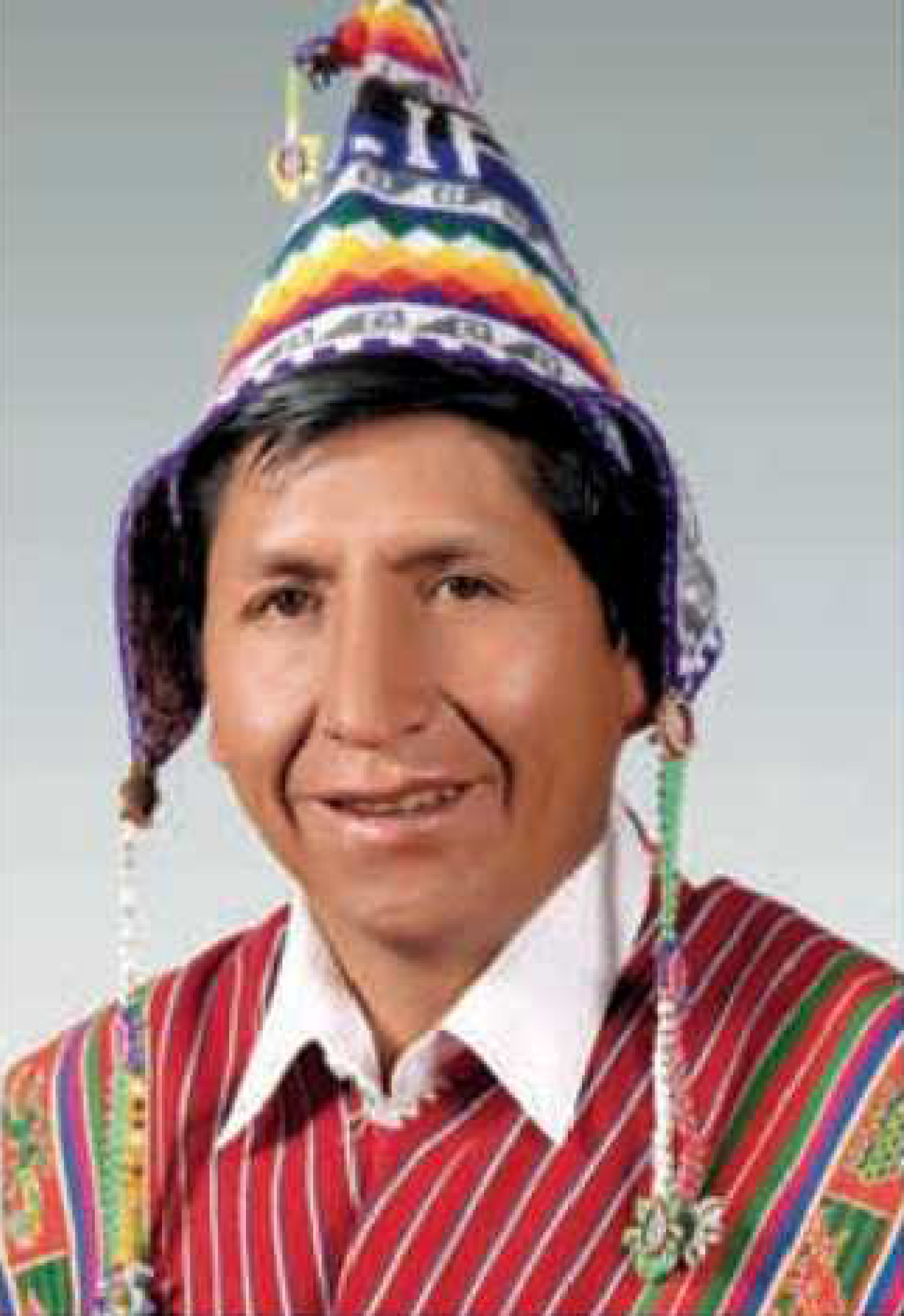
- Official portrait, 2014

Member of the Chamber of Deputies from Potosí circumscription 39
- In office 19 January 2010 – 18 January 2015
- Substitute: Filomena Mamani
- Preceded by: Hilarión Bustos
- Succeeded by: Rosa Álvarez
- Constituency: Rafael Bustillo

Personal details
- Born: Luis Gallego Condori; 21 June 1968 (age 58) Huayllani, Potosí, Bolivia
- Party: Movement for Socialism (2005–2017)
- Occupation: Lawyer; politician

Luis Gallego Condori (born 21 June 1968) is a Bolivian lawyer and politician who served as a member of the Chamber of Deputies from Potosí, representing circumscription 39 from 2010 to 2015.

Born in a peasant community in one of the least developed regions of rural Potosí, Gallego completed only portions of his primary education before dropping out to focus on agricultural work. As a young adult, he began scaling the ranks of traditional leadership, holding posts of both cultural and political significance within his Quechua community.

In 2009, Gallego was elected to the Chamber of Deputies on behalf of the Movement for Socialism, a party he militantly supported, only to later grow disenfranchised with. He sought to be elected ombudsman of Bolivia in 2022, but his previous political service disqualified him from holding the position.

== Early life and career ==
Luis Gallego was born on 21 June 1968 to Severino Gallego and Dorotea Condori, a peasant family native to Huayllani in the rural foothills of northern Potosí. Gallego spent his childhood in poverty, studying up to middle school before dropping out to dedicate himself to agricultural work. As a young adult, Gallego was selected to serve as a jilanqu, an indigenous authority charged with serving several jisk'a ayllus, or small communities. In the ensuing years, he reached the position of segunda mayor, the highest authority in his ayllu. Gallego's political trajectory led him to hold office on his ayllu's school board and serve as its communal mayor before finally rising to become corregidor, the most important political position within the ayllus.

== Chamber of Deputies ==
=== Election ===
In 2009, Gallego was selected by the ayllus to run for a seat in the Chamber of Deputies. He registered his candidacy with the Movement for Socialism (MAS-IPSP) – a party he had been an active member of since 2005 – and was presented to run in Potosí's circumscription 39, encompassing his home Bustillo Province. He won the race handily, defeating his next closest competitor by a wide margin, although his percentage is diluted down to a 42.1 percent plurality when the high tally of blank and null votes are taken into account.

=== Tenure ===
In parliament, Gallego drafted more than twenty bills relating to agriculture, irrigation, and mining in northern Potosí and worked to secure the delivery of agricultural machinery to the department's municipalities. He successfully procured a collective ownership title in favor of the Chullpa ayllu and was a leading proponent of the bill that declared the waters of the disputed Silala River a strategic natural resource of the state. Upon the conclusion of his term, Gallego was not nominated for reelection.

=== Commission assignments ===
- Plural Justice, Prosecutor's Office, and Legal Defense of the State Commission
  - Rural Native Indigenous Jurisdiction Committee (Secretary: 2010–2012, 2013–2014)
- Plural Economy, Production, and Industry Commission
  - Agriculture and Animal Husbandry Committee (2012–2013)
- Constitution, Legislation, and Electoral System Commission
  - Constitutional Review and Legislative Harmonization Committee (2014–2015)

== Later career ==
Despite his militant support for the MAS – even once controversially threatening to whip those who did not vote in favor of the ruling party – Gallego later grew disenfranchised with the party. He ultimately resigned from its ranks in 2017, claiming that it had grown "elite" and no longer attended to the needs of the indigenous peoples of Potosí. (Note: A similar case to Gallego's is that of his brother, Máximo. A member of an anti-government faction of the National Council of Ayllus and Markas of Qullasuyu, he ran for a seat in the Senate on the Bolivia Says No ticket in 2019, later serving as vice minister of decolonization in the administration of Jeanine Áñez.) Gallego spent the ensuing years in political retirement, during which time he graduated as a lawyer from the Bolivian Technological University.

In 2022, Gallego returned to the spotlight when he registered his application as a candidate for ombudsman. Despite an official prohibition on applicants who had held elective office in the previous eight years, Gallego was initially given the green light to move to the second phase. However, he was later disqualified upon opposition appeal, dashing his hopes of holding the position.

== Electoral history ==
Electoral history of Luis Gallego
Year	Office	Party	Votes			Result	Ref.
Year	Office	Party	Total	%	P.	Result	Ref.
2009	Deputy	Movement for Socialism	15,998	62.81%	1st	Won	
2022	Ombudsman	Nonpartisan	Disqualified			Lost	
Source: Plurinational Electoral Organ | Electoral Atlas

Chamber of Deputies of Bolivia
Preceded by Hilarión Bustos	Member of the Chamber of Deputies from Potosí circumscription 39; 2010–2015	Succeeded by Rosa Álvarez
