= Defensoría del Pueblo =

Defensoría del Pueblo (Spanish, 'public defender' or 'ombudsman') may refer to:

- Defensoría del Pueblo (Bolivia), a national government agency for that oversees and promotes human rights
- Ombudsman's Office of Colombia, a national government agency for overseeing the protection of civil and human rights
- Defensoría del Pueblo (Venezuela), a state-funded agency for investigating complaints against a public authority

== See also ==
- Ombudsman
