= Pedro Callisaya =

Bolivian constitutional lawyer (born 1966)

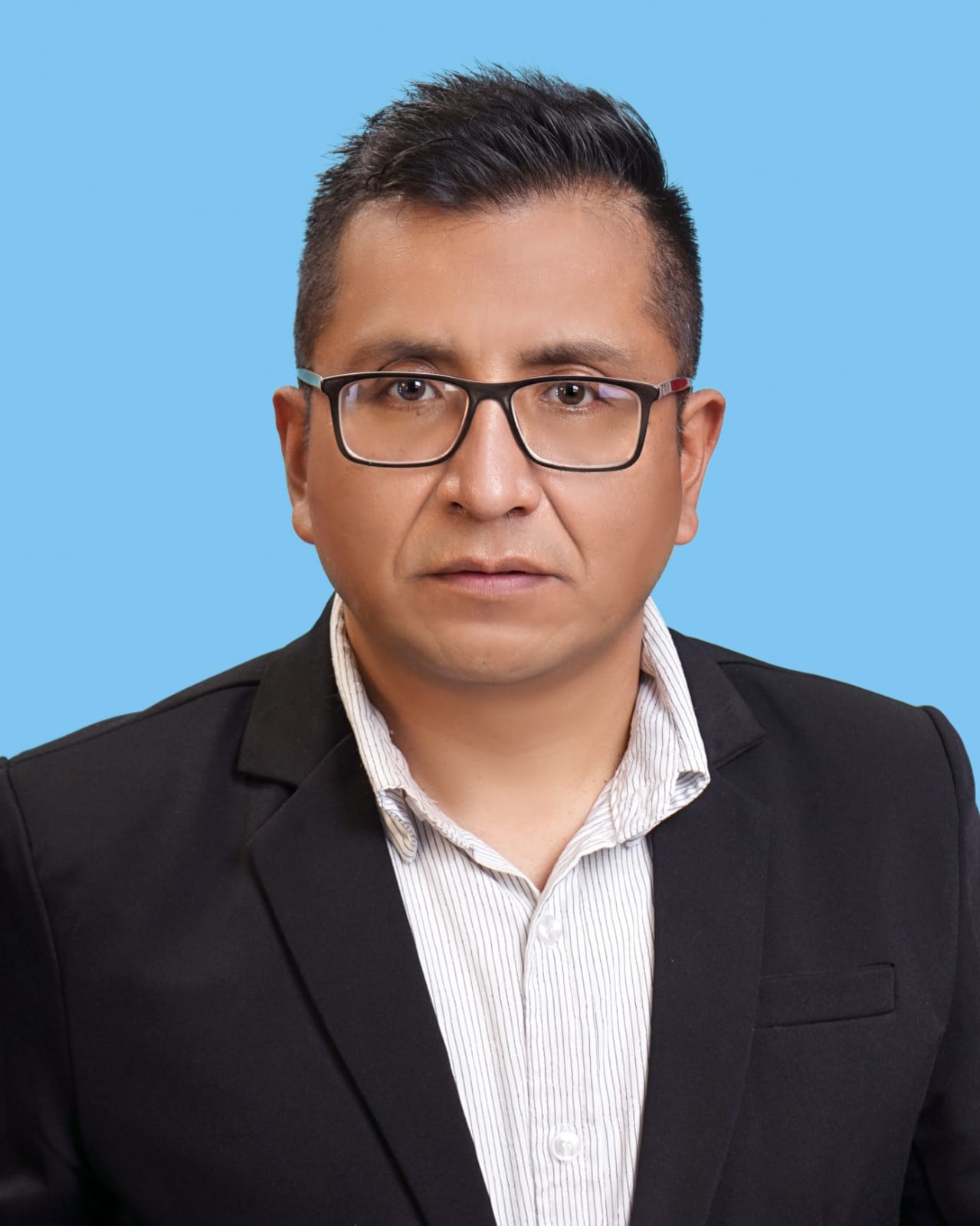

6th Ombudsman of Bolivia
- Incumbent
- Assumed office 27 September 2022
- Preceded by: Nadia Cruz (acting)

Personal details
- Born: Pedro Francisco Callisaya Aro; 10 October 1966 (age 59) La Paz, Bolivia
- Party: Independent
- Education: Higher University of San Andrés; Simón Bolívar Andean University
- Occupation: Educator; jurist; lawyer

Pedro Francisco Callisaya Aro (born 10 October 1966) is a Bolivian academic, constitutional lawyer, and jurist serving as the sixth ombudsman of Bolivia since 2022. Callisaya developed his career in academic circles, completing multiple graduate and postgraduate courses in the fields of constitutional law and human rights. After exercising a couple of minor public posts in the late 1990s, Callisaya entered the Ombudsman's Office, where he worked for over a decade. He served for two terms on the Departmental Court of Justice of La Paz from 2012 to 2016 and 2017 to 2021.

In 2022, Callisaya registered his candidacy for the position of ombudsman and was among the group of seven finalists to hold the post. Over the course of four failed votes, Callisaya consolidated his position as the preferred candidate of the ruling Movement for Socialism. However, he remained unable to attain the necessary two-thirds to be elected to the position of ombudsman, with the parliamentary opposition viewing him as too closely aligned with the government. He was finally elected during the fifth round of voting, receiving the support of ninety-five ruling party legislators in a session marked by the absence of opposition parliamentarians. Given the fraught manner in which he was elected, Callisaya's tenure as ombudsman faced the task of recovering the office's credibility as an impartial institution after years of increased politicization.

== Early life and career ==
An ethnic Aymara, Pedro Callisaya was born on 10 October 1966 in La Paz. He graduated as a lawyer from the Higher University of San Andrés before attending the Simón Bolívar Andean University, where he completed a master's in constitutional law specializing in human rights and criminal and civil procedure. After that, he undertook postgraduate studies abroad, attending the University of Alcalá in Madrid, Spain, where he completed courses in democracy, rule of law, and human rights. Additionally, he holds various diplomas in the fields of administrative law, interculturality and decolonization, and legal defense of the State, among others. Callisaya studied pedagogy at the Simón Bolívar Superior Normal School, serving intermittently as a law professor at a variety of public and private institutions, including the Bolivian Catholic University, the Franz Tamayo Private University, and the Public University of El Alto.

Callisaya spent much of his professional career as a minor public official in La Paz. He got his start as a legal secretary for the Fourth Labor and Social Security District Court, a position he held for two years. From 1999 to 2001, he served as a public defender for the Ministry of Justice before finally settling in the Ombudsman's Office during the administration of Ana María Romero. Callisaya exercised various roles and positions at the institution for over a decade, serving as head of direct management from 2002 to 2005 and director of the organization's La Paz office from 2006 to 2007. In 2010, he was appointed to head the body's Citizen Services Unit, a position he held until 2012, when he was replaced by Nadia Cruz. Shortly thereafter, Callisaya was sworn in as a magistrate on the Departmental Court of Justice of La Paz. He served for two terms between 2012 and 2016 and 2017 and 2021, taking a brief sabbatical to work as a human rights specialist for the Office of the United Nations High Commissioner for Human Rights from 2016 to 2017. Upon the conclusion of his second term, Callisaya continued to operate within the judiciary, presiding over the National Directorate of Real Rights from 2021 to 2022.

== Ombudsman of Bolivia ==
=== Election ===
With the process underway for the designation of a new ombudsman, Callisaya submitted his application for the position. In an election dominated by prominent public figures and notable names, Callisaya passed through the candidate evaluation phase with a relative low profile. By late April, he was among the group of seven finalists approved to be voted on by the Legislative Assembly. He received the support of sixty-five legislators in the first round of voting, establishing him as the frontrunner to win the election. Nonetheless, he remained far short of the necessary two-thirds to attain the position, with even the majority Movement for Socialism (MAS) initially divided between support for him and rival Porfirio Machado. Though the MAS eventually coalesced around Callisaya by the third round, the parliamentary opposition remained steadfast in its refusal to support his candidacy, considering him too closely aligned with the government. A total of five failed votes passed before the MAS finally resorted to political maneuvering to push Callisaya through, electing him by a vote of ninety-five to none in a last-minute session in which most opposition legislators were unable to attend.

=== Tenure ===
Callisaya's election was wracked with controversy, with observers of the process expressing unease regarding the increased co-option and politicization of the Ombudsman's Office as an institution. Upon being sworn in on 27 September, Callisaya echoed such concerns, accepting that his administration faced the challenge of recovering the organization's credibility as a non-partisan institution. This self-critical approach was met with hopeful optimism from some analysts, with activist Franco Albarracín commenting that Callisaya's statements were a "positive sign" that the new ombudsman would seek to be an impartial defender of human rights. Political analyst Gregorio Lanza remained more skeptical, stating that while "[Callisaya] differs in words from [those of his predecessor]", his response to ongoing crises would be the true test of his political independence.

== Electoral history ==
Electoral history of
Year	Office	Party	Votes			Result	Ref.
Year	Office	Party	Total	%	P.	Result	Ref.
2022	Ombudsman	Nonpartisan	95	97.94%	1st	Won	
Source: Plurinational Electoral Organ | Electoral Atlas

== Publications ==
- Callisaya Aro, Pedro (2013). Las Acciones de Defensa en el Código Procesal Constitucional: Una Perspectiva desde la Acción Amparo Constitucional (in Spanish). La Paz: Producciones CIMA.
- ————————— (2015). Protocolo de Actuación en Audiencias Preliminares y Complementaria del Proceso Civil (in Spanish). Tribunal Departamental de Justicia de La Paz.
- ————————— (2018). Gatopardo: Jurisprudencia sobre el Principio de la Verdad Material (in Spanish). La Paz: Revista Unidad de Postgrado y Relaciones Internacionales.
- ————————— (2019). La Prueba: Caracterización de la Prueba y los Medios de Prueba en el Código Procesal Civil Boliviano (in Spanish). La Paz: Editorial Ideas. ISBN 978-99974-0-602-6. OCLC 1105738549.
- ————————— (2022). ¿Por Quién Doblan las Campanas?: El Problema del Registro de Derechos Reales en Bolivia (in Spanish). La Paz.

Government offices
Preceded by Nadia Cruz; Acting	Ombudsman of Bolivia; 2022–present	Incumbent
