= Domestic violence in Bolivia =

Domestic violence in Bolivia is a pervasive and underreported problem. According to the Center for the Information and Development of Women (CIDEM), 70 percent of women suffer some form of abuse.

CIDEM noted that their 2006 statistics "did not reflect the full magnitude of the problem of violence against women" and that "a great number of women" did not report the aggression they faced on a daily basis. The most exhaustive national survey on domestic violence conducted by the National Statistical Institute in 2003 showed 64 percent of women were the target of some form of emotional, physical, or sexual abuse from their partner.

== Domestic life in Bolivia ==
Violence between partners towards partners male or female is seen to most typically correlate to those who experienced abuse as a child. The abuse could have been sexual, mental, or physical; it could also be first hand witness, meaning those who are abused in their adult life witnessed abuse to someone close associating the acceptance of this behavior.

Side effects of violence that can be seen in women are frequent headaches, bursts of fear, hearing voices, seizures and/or convulsions. These side effects often lead to suicidal thoughts resulting in increased rates. Bolivia contains a less than 1-100 ratio of citizens to mental health providers. The small number of providers that are available are too expensive for average citizens, especially those who married for money.

The informal living quarters in Bolivia add to the exposure of violence even years after the urbanization of the country. The cities living quarters represent those of dwellings, self-built with no connection to basic services like water. These quarters are wide spread across the country due to overcrowding that has led to the countries high poverty rates.

== Government action ==
In 2013, Bolivia passed a new comprehensive domestic violence law, which outlaws many forms of abuse of women, including marital rape.

As of November 26, 2006, the police Family Protection Brigade had attended to 8,954 cases, as compared to approximately 5,200 in 2005, and 3,640 were cases of repeat offenders. It was estimated that most cases of domestic violence went unreported.

== See also ==
- Women in Bolivia
- Crime in Bolivia
