= Ombudsman's Office of Bolivia =

Independent governmental institution

Ombudsman's Office

Ombudsman's Office overview
- Formed: 22 December 1997
- Jurisdiction: Bolivia
- Ombudsman's Office executive: Pedro Callisaya, Ombudsman
- Website: www.defensoria.gob.bo

The Ombudsman's Office of Bolivia (Spanish: Defensoría del Pueblo) is an independent governmental institution established by the Constitution, charged with overseeing the fulfillment, protection, and promotion of human rights in the country. The Ombudsman's Office is functionally, financially, and administratively independent of the four branches of the Bolivian government. It was established on 22 December 1997 by Law № 1818, and is currently regulated by Law № 870 of 13 December 2016. Governance scholar Tom Pegram writes that "the Bolivian Ombudsman's Office has been recognized as arguably the most effective state actor in terms of advancing rights and active citizenship".

== List of Ombudsmen ==
The Ombudsman or Defender of the People is the senior officer within the Ombudsman's Office, a post currently held by Pedro Callisaya.

Ombudsman		Votes	Took office	Left office	Term	Ref.
1	Ana María Romero	99	31 March 1998	31 March 2003	1,826	
–	Carmen Beatriz Ruiz	–	31 March 2003	6 October 2003	189	
2	Iván Zegada	99	6 October 2003	21 October 2003	15	
–	Office vacant 21 October 2003 – 18 December 2003				58	
3	Waldo Albarracín	76	18 December 2003	18 December 2008	1,827	
–	Rielma Mencias	–	18 December 2008	13 May 2010	511	
4	Rolando Villena	113	13 May 2010	13 May 2016	2,193	
–	Office vacant 13 May 2016 – 14 May 2016				1	
5	David Tezanos Pinto	103	14 May 2016	24 January 2019	985	
–	Office vacant 24 January 2019 – 30 January 2019				6	
–	Nadia Cruz	96	30 January 2019	27 September 2022	1,336	
6	Pedro Callisaya	95	27 September 2022	Incumbent	1,412	
