= Cabinet of Luis Arce =

Bolivian presidential administration and ministerial cabinet from 2020 to present

Cabinet of Luis Arce Arce Cabinet
- 222nd Cabinet of the Plurinational State of Bolivia
- 2020–2025
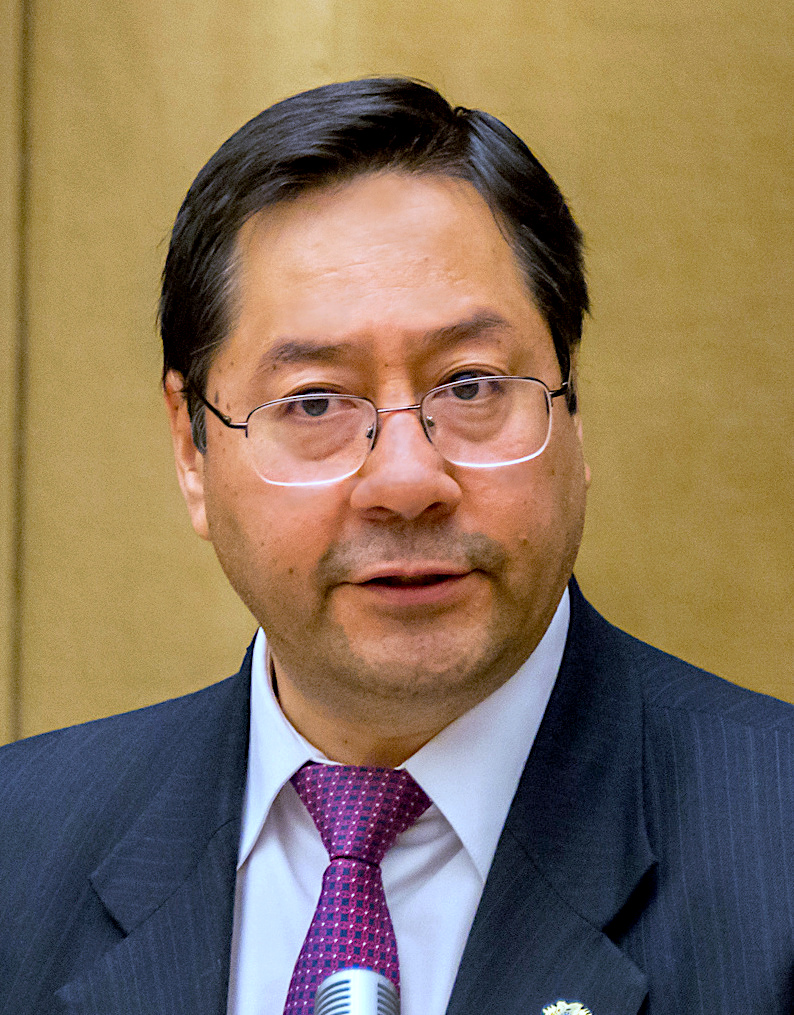
- Date formed: 9 November 2020 (5 years, 9 months)
- Date dissolved: 8 November 2025

People and organisations
- President: Luis Arce
- Vice President: David Choquehuanca
- No. of ministers: 17
- Total no. of members: 21 (incl. former members)
- Member parties: Movement for Socialism
- Status in legislature: Majority government

History
- Election: 2020 general election
- Legislature term: 2020–2025 Plurinational Legislative Assembly
- Predecessor: Cabinet of Jeanine Áñez
- Successor: Cabinet of Rodrigo Paz

The Arce Cabinet constituted the 222nd cabinet of the Plurinational State of Bolivia. It was formed on 9 November 2020, one day after Luis Arce was sworn in as the 67th president of Bolivia following the 2020 general election, succeeding the Áñez Cabinet. The cabinet is composed entirely of members of the ruling Movement for Socialism. Described as a "technocratic" cabinet, it was noted for the low-profile and youth of some of its members as well as its political distance from former president Evo Morales.

== Council of Ministers ==
Portfolio	Minister	Party	Prof.	Took office	Left office	Term	Ref.
President	Luis Arce	MAS	Eco.	8 November 2020	8 November 2025	1,826	
Vice President	David Choquehuanca	MAS	Dip.	8 November 2020	8 November 2025	1,826	
Minister of Foreign Affairs	Rogelio Mayta	MAS	Law.	9 November 2020	8 November 2025	1,825	
Minister of the Presidency	María Nela Prada	MAS	Dip.	9 November 2020	8 November 2025	1,825	
Minister of Government	Eduardo del Castillo	MAS	Law.	9 November 2020	8 November 2025	1,825	
Minister of Defense	Edmundo Novillo	MAS	Law.	9 November 2020	8 November 2025	1,825	
Minister of Development Planning	Gabriela Mendoza	MAS	Eco.	9 November 2020	8 November 2025	1,825	
Minister of Economy and Public Finance	Marcelo Montenegro	MAS	Eco.	9 November 2020	8 November 2025	1,825	
Minister of Hydrocarbons	Franklin Molina Ortiz	MAS	Eco.	9 November 2020	19 November 2020	1,825	
Minister of Hydrocarbons and Energies	Franklin Molina Ortiz	MAS	Eco.	19 November 2020	8 November 2025	1,825	
Minister of Productive Development and the Plural Economy	Néstor Huanca Chura	MAS	Eco.	9 November 2020	8 November 2025	1,825	
Minister of Public Works, Services, and Housing	Edgar Montaño	MAS	Eng.	9 November 2020	8 November 2025	1,825	
Minister of Mining and Metallurgy	Ramiro Villavicencio	MAS	Eng.	9 November 2020	8 November 2025	1,825	
Minister of Justice and Institutional Transparency	Iván Lima	MAS	Law.	9 November 2020	8 November 2025	1,825	
Minister of Labor, Employment, and Social Security	Verónica Navia Tejada	MAS	Soc.	9 November 2020	8 November 2025	1,825	
Minister of Health	Édgar Pozo	MAS	Dr.	9 November 2020	19 November 2020	68	
Minister of Health and Sports	Édgar Pozo	MAS	Dr.	19 November 2020	16 January 2021	68	
Minister of Health and Sports	Jeyson Auza	MAS	Dr.	16 January 2021	8 November 2025	1,757	
Minister of Environment and Water	Juan Santos Cruz	MAS	Uni.	9 November 2020	8 November 2025	1,825	
Minister of Education, Sports, and Cultures	Adrián Quelca	PCB	Prof.	9 November 2020	19 November 2020	368	
Minister of Education	Adrián Quelca	PCB	Prof.	19 November 2020	12 November 2021	368	
Minister of Education	Office vacant 12–19 November 2021					7	(Note: Quelca continued to perform ministerial functions in an unclear, semi-official capacity for some days after his resignation.)
Minister of Education	Edgar Pary	MAS	Prof.	19 November 2021	8 November 2025	1,450	
Minister of Rural Development and Land	Wilson Cáceres	MAS	Uni.	9 November 2020	1 December 2020	22	
Minister of Rural Development and Land	Edwin Characayo	MAS	Agr.	1 December 2020	14 April 2021	134	
Minister of Rural Development and Land	Office vacant 14–20 April 2021					6	
Minister of Rural Development and Land	Remmy Gonzáles	MAS	Eng.	20 April 2021	8 November 2025	1,663	
Ministry of Cultures, Decolonization and Depatriarchalization	Office vacant 13–20 November 2020					7	
Ministry of Cultures, Decolonization and Depatriarchalization	Sabina Orellana	MAS	Uni.	20 November 2020	8 November 2025	1,814	
Minister of Energies	Office vacant 9–12 November 2020					3	
Minister of Energies	Franklin Molina Ortiz (Note: As Minister of Hydrocarbons.)	MAS	Eco.	12 November 2020	19 November 2020	7	
Minister of Energies	Office merged with the Ministry of Hydrocarbons						

== Composition ==
Portfolio	Minister		Party	Term of office	
Portfolio	Portrait	Name	Party	Incumbent	Term
Ministry of Foreign Affairs		Rogelio Mayta	Movement for Socialism	9 November 2020	5 years, 288 days
Ministry of Foreign Affairs	Vice Ministers: Portfolio / Vice Minister / Party / Prof. / Took office / Left office / Term / Ref.; Vice Minister of Foreign Affairs / Freddy Mamani Machaca / MAS / Prof. / 4 December 2020 / Incumbent / 2,089; Vice Minister of Foreign Trade and Integration / Benjamín Blanco / MAS / Bus. / 1 December 2020 / Incumbent / 2,092; Vice Minister of Institutional and Consular Management / Eva Gloria Chuquimia / MAS / Law. / 1 December 2020 / Incumbent / 2,092				
Ministry of the Presidency		María Nela Prada	Movement for Socialism	9 November 2020	5 years, 288 days
Ministry of the Presidency	Vice Ministers: Portfolio / Vice Minister / Party / Prof. / Took office / Left office / Term / Ref.; Vice Minister of Coordination and Government Management / Freddy Bobaryn / MAS / Poli. / 13 November 2020 / Incumbent / 2,110; Vice Minister of Coordination with Social Movements and Civil Society / Juan Villca / MAS / Uni. / 12 November 2020 / Incumbent / 2,111; Vice Minister of Autonomies / David Pérez Rapu / MAS / Eco. / 24 November 2020 / 13 May 2021 / 170; Vice Minister of Autonomies / Álvaro Ruiz García / MAS / Law. / 14 May 2021 / Incumbent / 1,928; Vice Minister of Communication / Gabriela Alcón / MAS / Jrnl. / 12 November 2020 / Incumbent / 2,111				
Ministry of Government		Eduardo del Castillo	Movement for Socialism	9 November 2020	5 years, 288 days
Ministry of Government	Vice Ministers: Portfolio / Vice Minister / Party / Prof. / Took office / Left office / Term / Ref.; Vice Minister of Citizen Security / Gonzalo Lazcano / MAS / Law. / 19 November 2020 / 7 April 2021 / 139; Vice Minister of Citizen Security / Roberto Ríos / MAS / Law. / 7 April 2021 / Incumbent / 1,965; Vice Minister of Internal Affairs and Police / Emilio Rodas / MAS / Law. / 19 November 2020 / 28 June 2021 / 221; Vice Minister of Internal Affairs and Police / Nelson Cox / MAS / Law. / 28 June 2021 / 10 January 2022 / 196; Vice Minister of Internal Affairs and Police / Office vacant 10 January 2022–present / / / / / 1,687; Vice Minister of Social Defense and Controlled Substances / Jaime Mamani / MAS / Uni. / 13 November 2020 / Incumbent / 2,110				
Ministry of Defense		Edmundo Novillo	Movement for Socialism	9 November 2020	5 years, 288 days
Ministry of Defense	Vice Ministers: Portfolio / Vice Minister / Party / Prof. / Took office / Left office / Term / Ref.; Vice Minister of Civil Defense / Juan Carlos Calvimontes / MAS / Dr. / 12 November 2020 / Incumbent / 2,111; Vice Minister of Defense and Cooperation to Integral Development / José Manuel Puente / MAS / Mil. / 17 November 2020 / Incumbent / 2,106; Vice Minister of the Fight Against; Smuggling / Gonzalo Renán Rodríguez / MAS / Mil. / 17 November 2020 / 27 February 2021 / 102; Vice Minister of the Fight Against; Smuggling / Office vacant 27 February – 23 April 2021 / / / / / 55; Vice Minister of the Fight Against; Smuggling / Daniel Pedro Vargas / MAS / Mil. / 23 April 2021 / Incumbent / 1,949				
Ministry of Development Planning		Gabriela Mendoza	Movement for Socialism	9 November 2020	5 years, 288 days
Ministry of Development Planning	Vice Ministers: Portfolio / Vice Minister / Party / Prof. / Took office / Left office / Term / Ref.; Vice Minister of Planning and Coordination / Diego Pacheco / MAS / – / 10 December 2020 / 12 April 2021 / 123; Vice Minister of Planning and Coordination / Office vacant 12–16 April 2021 / / / / / 4; Vice Minister of Planning and Coordination / Marcelo Laura / MAS / – / 16 April 2021 / Incumbent / 1,956; Vice Minister of Public Investment and External Financing / Harley Rodríguez / MAS / – / 10 December 2020 / 12 April 2021 / 123; Vice Minister of Public Investment and External Financing / Office vacant 12–16 April 2021 / / / / / 4; Vice Minister of Public Investment and External Financing / David Guachalla / MAS / – / 16 April 2021 / Incumbent / 1,956; Vice Minister of Strategic; Planning of the State / Huáscar Ajata / MAS / – / 11 January 2021 / Incumbent / 2,051				
Ministry of Economy and Public Finance		Marcelo Montenegro	Movement for Socialism	9 November 2020	5 years, 288 days
Ministry of Economy and Public Finance	Vice Ministers: Portfolio / Vice Minister / Party / Prof. / Took office / Left office / Term / Ref.; Vice Minister of Budget and Fiscal Accounting / Zenón Mamani / MAS / Acct. / 12 November 2020 / Incumbent / 2,111; Vice Minister of Tax Policy / Johnny Morales / MAS / Eco. / 12 November 2020 / Incumbent / 2,111; Vice Minister of Pensions and Financial Services / Ivette Espinoza / MAS / Eco. / 12 November 2020 / Incumbent / 2,111; Vice Minister of the Treasury and Public Credit / Sergio Cusicanqui / MAS / Eco. / 12 November 2020 / Incumbent / 2,111				
Ministry of Hydrocarbons and Energies		Franklin Molina Ortiz	Movement for Socialism	9 November 2020	5 years, 288 days
Ministry of Hydrocarbons and Energies	Vice Ministers: Portfolio / Vice Minister / Party / Prof. / Took office / Left office / Term / Ref.; Vice Minister of Exploration and Exploitation of Hydrocarbons / Luis Poma / MAS / Geo. / 27 November 2020 / Incumbent / 2,096; Vice Minister of Industrialization, Commercialization, Transportation and Storage of Hydrocarbons / William Donaire / MAS / – / 23 November 2020 / Incumbent / 2,100; Vice Minister of Energy; Planning and Development / Mario Alberto Sapiencia Arrieta / MAS / – / 16 November 2020 / Incumbent / 2,107; Vice Minister of High; Energy Technologies / Álvaro Arnez / MAS / Eng. / 27 November 2020 / Incumbent / 2,096; Vice Minister of Electricity and Alternative Energies / José María Salvador Romay / MAS / Eng. / 30 November 2020 / Incumbent / 2,093				
Ministry of Productive; Development and the Plural Economy		Néstor Huanca Chura	Movement for Socialism	9 November 2020	5 years, 288 days
Ministry of Productive; Development and the Plural Economy	Vice Ministers: Portfolio / Vice Minister / Party / Prof. / Took office / Left office / Term / Ref.; Vice Minister of Micro and Small Business / Nelson Aruquipa / MAS / Eng. / 4 December 2020 / Incumbent / 2,089; Vice Minister of Industrial Production at Medium and Large Scale / Luis Siles / MAS / Eng. / 4 December 2020 / Incumbent / 2,089; Vice Minister of Internal Trade / Gróver Lacoa / MAS / Eng. / 4 December 2020 / Incumbent / 2,089; Vice Minister of Tourism / Eliana Ampuero / MAS / Tur. / 4 December 2020 / Incumbent / 2,089				
Ministry of Public Works, Services, and Housing		Edgar Montaño	Movement for Socialism	9 November 2020	5 years, 288 days
Ministry of Public Works, Services, and Housing	Vice Ministers: Portfolio / Vice Minister / Party / Prof. / Took office / Left office / Term / Ref.; Vice Minister of Transport / Nino Saúl Herbas / MAS / – / 29 January 2021 / Incumbent / 2,033; Vice Minister of Telecommunications / Edwin Édgar Arandia Rojas / MAS / Eng. / 3 December 2020 / Incumbent / 2,090; Vice Minister of Housing and Urbanism / Róger Cruz Pinedo / MAS / – / 3 December 2020 / Incumbent / 2,090				
Ministry of Mining and Metallurgy		Ramiro Villavicencio	Movement for Socialism	9 November 2020	5 years, 288 days
Ministry of Mining and Metallurgy	Vice Ministers: Portfolio / Vice Minister / Party / Prof. / Took office / Left office / Term / Ref.; Vice Minister of Productive Development and Metallurgical Mining / Juan José Carvajal Huanca / MAS / – / 20 November 2020 / Incumbent / 2,103; Vice Minister of Mining Policy, Regulation, and Inspection / Wiston Medrano Escalante / MAS / Eng. / 20 November 2020 / Incumbent / 2,103; Vice Minister of Mining Cooperatives / Mauricio Guzmán Mujica / MAS / – / 20 November 2020 / Incumbent / 2,103				
Ministry of Justice and Institutional Transparency		Iván Lima	Movement for Socialism	9 November 2020	5 years, 288 days
Ministry of Justice and Institutional Transparency	Vice Ministers: Portfolio / Vice Minister / Party / Prof. / Took office / Left office / Term / Ref.; Vice Minister of Justice and Fundamental Rights / César Adalid Siles Bazán / MAS / Law. / 12 November 2020 / Incumbent / 2,111; Vice Minister of Equal Opportunities / Miriam Julieta Huacani Zapana / MAS / Soc. / 12 November 2020 / Incumbent / 2,111; Vice Minister of Indigenous Peasant Justice / Silvia Alarcón Heredia / MAS / Law. / 24 November 2020 / Incumbent / 2,099; Vice Minister of Defense of the Rights of the User and Consumer / Jorge Silva Trujillo / MAS / Law. / 12 November 2020 / Incumbent / 2,111; Vice Minister of Institutional Transparency and the Fight Against Corruption / Julia Susana Ríos Laguna / MAS / Law. / 12 November 2020 / Incumbent / 2,111				
Ministry of Labor, Employment, and Social Security		Verónica Navia Tejada	Movement for Socialism	9 November 2020	5 years, 288 days
Ministry of Labor, Employment, and Social Security	Vice Ministers: Portfolio / Vice Minister / Party / Prof. / Took office / Left office / Term / Ref.; Vice Minister of Labor and Social Security / Víctor Quispe Ticona / MAS / Uni. / 17 November 2020 / Incumbent / 2,106; Vice Minister of Employment, Civil Service and Cooperatives / Martín Bazurco / MAS / – / 18 December 2020 / 30 July 2021 / 224; Vice Minister of Employment, Civil Service and Cooperatives / Gonzalo Zambrana Ávila / MAS / Eco. / 30 July 2021 / Incumbent / 1,851				
Ministry of Health and Sports		Jeyson Auza	Movement for Socialism	16 January 2021	5 years, 220 days
Ministry of Health and Sports	Vice Ministers: Portfolio / Vice Minister / Party / Prof. / Took office / Left office / Term / Ref.; Vice Minister of Health Insurance and Management of the Unified Health System / Álvaro Terrazas / MAS / Dr. / 23 November 2020 / Incumbent / 2,100; Vice Minister of Promotion, Epidemiological; Surveillance, and Traditional Medicine / María Renee Castro / MAS / Bio. / 23 November 2020 / Incumbent / 2,100; Vice Minister of Health System Management / Alejandra Hidalgo Ugarte / MAS / Dr. / 23 November 2020 / Incumbent / 2,100; Vice Minister of Sports / Cielo Veizaga / MAS / Ftbl. / 17 December 2020 / Incumbent / 2,076				
Ministry of Environment and Water		Juan Santos Cruz	Movement for Socialism	9 November 2020	5 years, 288 days
Ministry of Environment and Water	Vice Ministers: Portfolio / Vice Minister / Party / Prof. / Took office / Left office / Term / Ref.; Vice Minister of Drinking Water and Basic Sanitation / Carmelo Valda / MAS / Eng. / 26 November 2020 / Incumbent / 2,097; Vice Minister of Environment, Biodiversity, Climate Change, and Forest Management and Development / Magin Herrera / MAS / – / 20 November 2020 / Incumbent / 2,103; Vice Minister of Water Resources and Irrigation / Wilder Quiroz Guzmán / MAS / – / 26 November 2020 / Incumbent / 2,097				
Ministry of Education		Edgar Pary Chambi	Movement for Socialism	19 November 2021	4 years, 278 days
Ministry of Education	Vice Ministers: Portfolio / Vice Minister / Party / Prof. / Took office / Left office / Term / Ref.; Vice Minister of Regular Education / Bartolomé Puma Velázquez / MAS / – / 24 November 2020 / Incumbent / 2,099; Vice Minister of Higher Education and Professional Training / Aurea Balderrama Almendras / MAS / – / 24 November 2020 / 1 December 2021 / 372; Vice Minister of Higher Education and Professional Training / José Luis Gutiérrez / MAS / – / 1 December 2021 / Incumbent / 1,727; Vice Minister of Alternative and Special Education / Sandra Cristina Cruz Nina / MAS / – / 24 November 2020 / Incumbent / 2,099; Vice Minister of Science and Technology / Julio Gómez Chambilla / MAS / Prof. / 19 January 2021 / Incumbent / 2,043				
Ministry of Rural; Development and Lands		Remmy Gonzáles	Movement for Socialism	20 April 2021	5 years, 126 days
Ministry of Rural; Development and Lands	Vice Ministers: Portfolio / Vice Minister / Party / Prof. / Took office / Left office / Term / Ref.; Vice Minister of Rural and Agricultural Development / Álvaro Mollinedo / MAS / – / 17 November 2020 / Incumbent / 2,106; Vice Minister of Coca and Integral Development / Rolando Canceno Mamani / MAS / – / 20 November 2020 / 17 September 2021 / 301; Vice Minister of Coca and Integral Development / Juan Pablo Jove Álvarez / MAS / – / 17 September 2021 / Incumbent / 1,802; Vice Minister of Lands / Juan José García Cruz / MAS / – / 1 February 2021 / Incumbent / 2,030				
Ministry of Cultures; Decolonization and Depatriarchalization		Sabina Orellana	Movement for Socialism	20 November 2020	5 years, 277 days
Ministry of Cultures; Decolonization and Depatriarchalization	Vice Ministers: Portfolio / Vice Minister / Party / Prof. / Took office / Left office / Term / Ref.; Vice Minister of Decolonization and Depatriarchalization / Pelagio Condori / MAS / – / 20 November 2020 / Incumbent / 2,103; Vice Minister of Interculturality / Cergio Prudencio / MAS / Mus. / 20 November 2020 / 12 March 2021 / 112; Vice Minister of Interculturality / Office vacant 12 March – 7 July 2021 / / / / / 117; Vice Minister of Interculturality / Juan Carlos Cordero / MAS / Mus. / 7 July 2021 / Incumbent / 1,874				

== History ==
According to Arce, the council of ministers accompanying him would be "an austere government with the priority of reactivating the economy and examining the health crisis". The cabinet has been noted for the low profile of its appointed members, predominantly made up of low-level officials and academics who, despite their youth, have long management experience. Political scientist Helena Argirakis affirms that "certain fundamental features that characterize the MAS" are maintained in this cabinet, while at the same time it balances "experience and innovation, the country's regional diversity and professional, political, union and social training". Analysts also highlighted the distance between the appointees and former president and MAS leader Evo Morales. Among the ministers, only Minister of Defense Edmundo Novillo had any long history within the ranks of MAS, being president of the Chamber of Deputies and governor of Cochabamba. These factors reaffirmed Arce's statement that Morales would have no direct participation in his administration.

A year into the Arce administration, calls for renewal within the cabinet among sectors related to the MAS began to arise. On 30 December 2021, Morales publicly requested that Arce "improve his cabinet". The following day, Deputy Daniel Rojas went one step further, calling some members of Arce's cabinet "parasites" and affirming that certain social organizations were discontent with their management. Meanwhile, Deputy Juanito Angulo announced that the Plurinational Legislative Assembly would evaluate the cabinet upon returning from parliamentary recess and intended to make recommendations for change based on that. Deputy Héctor Arce stated that the assembly would wait for a response by 22 or 23 January —the traditional date in which Morales ratified his ministers in each year of his administration— "and if the suggested changes are not carried out, we will take action on the matter".

Among the complaints of the MAS was the view that some ministers were not sufficiently political. Eight ministers were observed as not holding political militancy within the MAS: Minister of Foreign Affairs Rogelio Mayta; of Government Eduardo del Castillo; of Justice, Iván Lima; of Economy, Marcelo Montenegro; of Hydrocarbons, Franklin Molina; of Mining, Ramiro Villavicencio; of Planning, Gabriela Mendoza; and of Labor, Verónica Navia Tejada. In particular, del Castillo and Lima were spotlighted for the lack of enforceable convictions against those responsible for the alleged coup d'état that ousted Morales during the 2019 political crisis. On 6 January 2022, the Unified Syndical Confederation of Rural Workers (CSUTCB) passed a motion to censure del Castillo and Lima along with five other ministers and three vice ministers for "not working at the height of their mandate and being negligent". On the matter, Página Siete pointed out that "Morales puts Arce in a jam because, after his demand, the president will have to make a decision: if he makes cabinet changes, he will show himself as a president without authority and as a puppet of Evo Morales, and if he does not do so, he will have to enter a public confrontation with his own political boss".

At a five-hour meeting held on 19 January 2022, the Arce administration and the Pact of Unity agreed to postpone any cabinet changes until 11 February. On that date, the unions conceded to the president, allowing him to ratify his cabinet without changing ministers. In exchange, Arce agreed to allow them to carry out a "permanent evaluation" of his cabinet on a monthly basis.

=== Cabinets ===
N°	Formed	Days	Decree
I	9 November 2020	2,114	Presidential Decree N° 4389

=== Structural changes ===
Arce's cabinet initially received criticism from indigenous leaders such as Felipe Quispe due to its lack of indigenous representation. However, on 13 November 2020, Arce issued Supreme Decree N° 4393 which reinstated the Ministry of Cultures, which had previously been reduced to a vice-ministry under the Ministry of Education by the administration of Jeanine Áñez. The new office was dubbed as the Ministry of Cultures, Decolonization, and Depatriarchalization and was given the expanded task of combating "inequality between nationalities, as well as between men and women". As well as elevating the portfolio of cultures into its own ministry, the portfolio of sports was also stripped from the Ministry of Education and reassigned to the Ministry of Health. The Vice Ministry of Communications also noted that the creation of the new state agency came thanks to the unification of the energies and hydrocarbons portfolios into a single office, thus keeping the same number of cabinet posts.

The new changes came into effect on 19 November when Édgar Pozo, Adrián Quelca, and Franklin Molina Ortiz were ratified in their positions under new titles by Presidential Decree N° 4397. Sabina Orellana, of Quechua origin, was appointed to head the new ministry the following day, adding one indigenous representative to the cabinet.

Portfolio	Part of	Transferred to	Date	Decree
Cultures	Ministry of Education	Ministry of Cultures	13 November 2020	Supreme Decree N° 4393
Sports	Ministry of Education	Ministry of Health	13 November 2020	Supreme Decree N° 4393
Energies	Ministry of Energies	Ministry of Hydrocarbons	13 November 2020	Supreme Decree N° 4393
