= Nadia Cruz =

Bolivian lawyer and politician (born 1982)

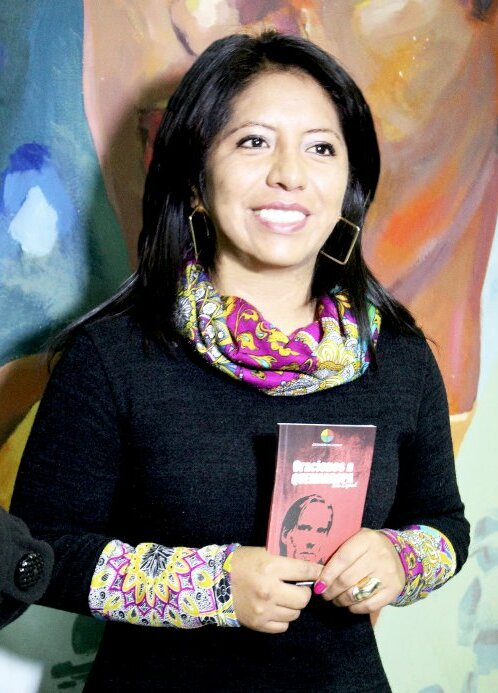

Vice Minister of Equal Opportunities
- Incumbent
- Assumed office 1 November 2022
- President: Luis Arce
- Minister: Iván Lima
- Preceded by: Carla Sandy (acting)

Ombudsman of Bolivia
- Acting
- In office 30 January 2019 – 27 September 2022
- Preceded by: David Tezanos Pinto
- Succeeded by: Pedro Callisaya

Personal details
- Born: Nadia Alejandra Cruz Tarifa; 10 December 1982 (age 43) La Paz, Bolivia
- Party: Independent
- Education: Bolivian Catholic University; Higher University of San Andrés
- Occupation: Lawyer; politician

Nadia Alejandra Cruz Tarifa (born 10 December 1982) is a Bolivian lawyer and politician serving as vice minister of equal opportunities since 2022. Cruz developed her career practicing law in La Paz and El Alto, during which time she became an active member and advisor to various human rights NGOs. Starting in the 2010s, Cruz began serving as a public official in the Ombudsman's Office, where she exercised a multitude of minor functions before being appointed deputy ombudsman for the defense of and compliance with human rights. Following the intra-term resignation of David Tezanos Pinto in 2019, Cruz was among three deputy ombudsmen in the line of succession and was considered the only viable candidate to assume the position.

Though intended to serve as acting ombudsman for just ninety days, procedural delays and a year-long political crisis led Cruz's tenure to drag on, even exceeding the expiration of Tezanos Pinto's original term. When the process for electing a new ombudsman was reinitiated in 2022, Cruz sought to be elected to a full term, but her candidacy was blocked by the legislative opposition, who had long-criticized her alleged partisan affinity toward the ruling Movement for Socialism. Cruz's extended tenure, surpassing the ninety-day mandate for acting authorities and the expiration of her predecessor's original six-year term, prompted legal ambiguity, with many constitutional experts regarding her final months in office to be a violation of the Constitution.

== Early life and career ==
An ethnic Aymara, Nadia Cruz was born on 10 December 1982 in La Paz. She graduated as a lawyer from the Bolivian Catholic University in 2006 before completing a master's in constitutional law and procedure at the Higher University of San Andrés. Additionally, she holds various diplomas in the fields of human rights, higher education, and leadership, among others. Cruz practiced law in La Paz and El Alto, where she directed the agrarian and social law firm Veritas from 2006 to 2007. Around this time, she became a member of the Permanent Assembly of Human Rights before serving as a legal advisor for the Association of Relatives of Disappeared Detainees and Martyrs for National Freedom (ASOFAM) from 2007 to 2010. As a member of ASOFAM, Cruz held a seat on the Committee for the Trial of Responsibilities against former president Gonzalo Sánchez de Lozada and was a member of the Legal Commission of the Trial Committee that promoted a criminal process against former Pando prefect Leopoldo Fernández for his role in the Porvenir massacre.

During the administration of Rolando Villena, Cruz began a career as a public official in the Ombudsman's Office, where she worked as a human rights consultant. In 2012, she was appointed to head the office's Citizen Services Unit, where she served under Deputy Ombudsman Jaime Quiroga. When Quiroga resigned in 2014, Cruz also left her post. In the ensuing two years, Cruz held minor legal positions in the ministries of government and justice before returning to the Ombudsman's Office as head of conflict prevention and attention. After briefly exercising a variety of minor roles, Cruz was appointed to serve as deputy ombudsman for the defense of and compliance with human rights, a post she held until 2019.

== Ombudsman of Bolivia ==
Cruz's tenure as deputy ombudsman coincided with the sudden resignation of incumbent David Tezanos Pinto, who was forced to step down mid-term to deal with a domestic violence suit filed by his then-wife. As a result, the legislature was tasked with electing by simple majority an acting ombudsman from among the three incumbent deputies: Cruz, Ximena Fajardo, and Israel Quino. On 30 January 2019, legislators from the ruling Movement for Socialism (MAS) elected Cruz by a vote of ninety-six to zero in a session boycotted by the parliamentary opposition. Though initially saddled with just a ninety-day transitory mandate, Cruz's term in office quickly surpassed that deadline as the process of designating a new authority stalled in the legislature. By the end of her expected term in April, the MAS opted not to replace Cruz with a new acting authority, justifying that the ninety-day mandate was merely "customary" and not enshrined by law.

Throughout Cruz's extended tenure, her administration routinely faced criticism from the political opposition for her alleged partisan bias in favor of the ruling party, with opponents pointing to her participation in pro-MAS electoral rallies and other events as evidence of this claim. Following the collapse of President Evo Morales' government in late 2019, the opposition-led transitional administration of Jeanine Áñez withdrew its recognition of Cruz's authority. The new government asserted that Cruz's term had expired upon the completion of her ninety-day mandate in April and, therefore, that she was illegally exercising the position of ombudsman, for which all official acts she had since carried out were declared null and void.

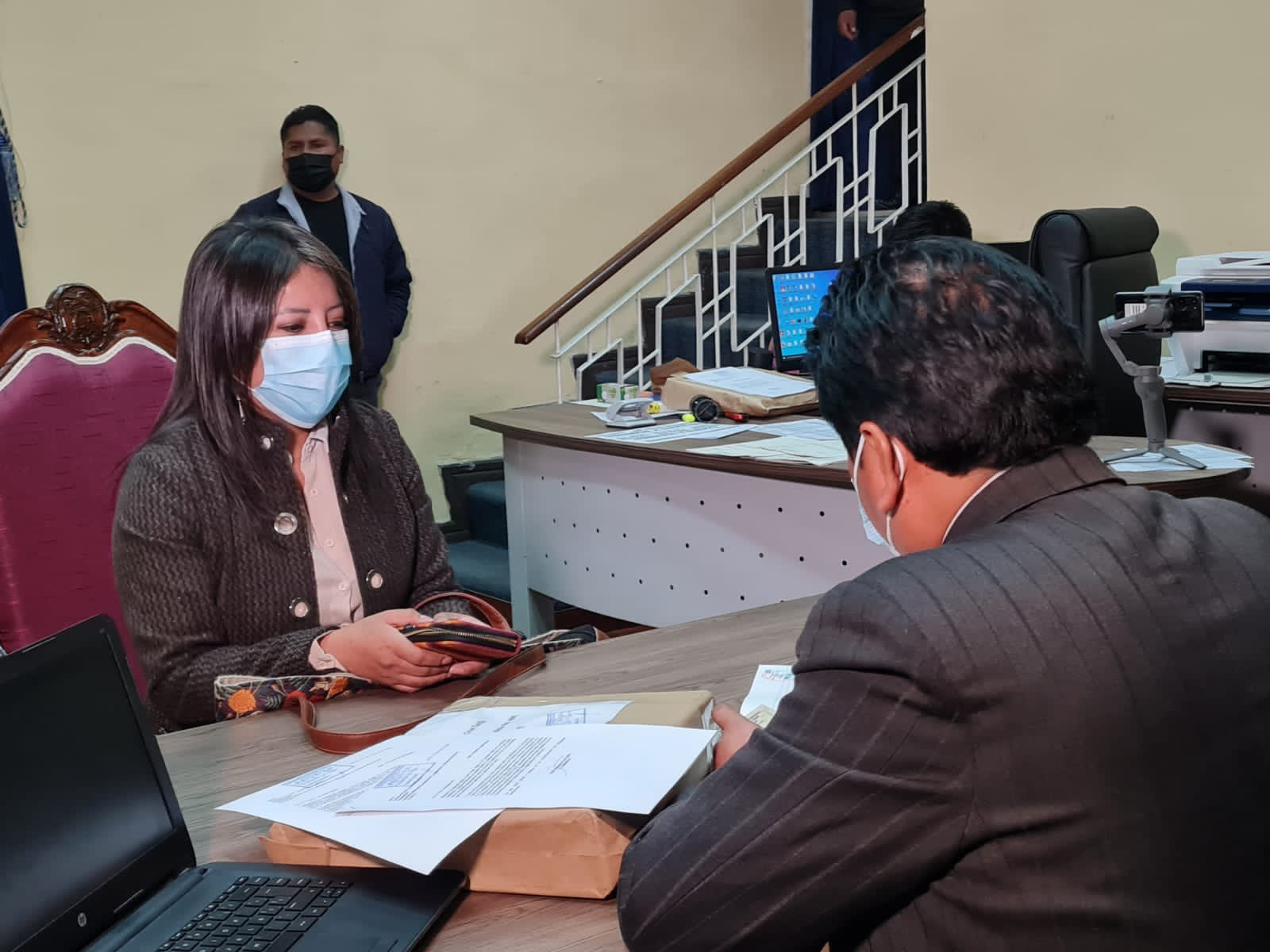
Cruz files her application for a full term, 1 April 2022.

Though State recognition of Cruz's authority was restored with the MAS's return to power in late 2020, concern regarding her ongoing presence only continued to grow. By mid-2021, Cruz's interim mandate had surpassed her predecessor's length in office. For the opposition, her semi-permanence responded to political calculations, considering that the MAS had lost its parliamentary supermajority in the 2020 general election and thus could no longer designate a new incumbent unilaterally. By early 2022, with Tezanos Pinto's original six-year term set to expire in mere months, the MAS initiated the process of electing a new ombudsman. Consulted on whether she would apply for a full term, Cruz assured that such considerations were not of interest to her. However, Cruz later backtracked on that position, unexpectedly filing her candidacy on the final day of registration.

Though the MAS-majority Mixed Legislative Commission overseeing the election process initially qualified her to move to the second phase, Cruz's candidacy was challenged by the opposition on the grounds that the Constitution prohibits any former ombudsman from running again regardless of whether or not they performed their functions in an acting capacity. This reasoning was accepted by the ruling party, with the Mixed Commission unanimously resolving to revoke her authorization. For her part, Cruz denounced the decision as "unfair, arbitrary, illegal, and unconstitutional" but opted not to file an appeal.

Unable to compete for a full term, Cruz continued in office for the duration of the ombudsman election process. By May, with the ruling party and opposition unable to agree on a singular candidate, legal questions surrounding Cruz's ongoing incumbency once again propped up. With Tezanos Pinto's original six-year term expiring on 14 May, the Ombudsman's Office faced an imminent constitutional crisis. In the preceding days, the MAS analyzed the possibility of replacing Cruz with a new acting authority by simple majority. Ultimately, however, the ruling party opted to extend Cruz's mandate as ombudsman, relying on an interpretation of the body's regulations that allowed for an acting authority to remain in office until the appointment of a new official. This justification was rejected by the opposition and questioned by legal experts, who considered Cruz's continuation in office to be illegal and unconstitutional, constituting a usurpation of functions. Nonetheless, she continued to hold the post for another five months. Finally, in September 2022, after three-and-a-half years without an official incumbent, Pedro Callisaya was elected to succeed Cruz as the country's human rights ombudsman.

== Later career ==
Upon to conclusion of her mandate, Cruz continued to operate within the Ombudsman's Office, where she worked as a semi-official staff member. According to Callisaya, Cruz had stayed on to complete a final report on the work carried out throughout her administration. Upon the completion of her tenure in the Ombudsman's Office, Cruz took a brief break from public service. Within a month, however, she had returned to government administration, passing to the executive branch, where she was appointed vice minister of equal opportunities. For the opposition, her selection was "an award from MAS [for having defended its government]," an idea Cruz attempted to push against at her swearing-in ceremony. "My political partisanship is sole and clear, and it is with human rights," she stated.

== Electoral history ==
Electoral history of Nadia Cruz
| Year | Office | Party | Votes | | | Result |
| Year | Office | Party | Total | % | P. | Result |
|---|---|---|---|---|---|---|
| 2019 | Ombudsman | Nonpartisan | 96 | 100% | 1st | Won |
| 2022 | Ombudsman | Nonpartisan | Disqualified | | | Lost |

Government offices
| Preceded by David Tezanos Pinto | Ombudsman of Bolivia; Acting; 2020–2022 | Succeeded by Pedro Callisaya |
| Preceded by Carla Sandy; Acting | Vice Minister of Equal Opportunities; 2022–present | Incumbent |
