= Vero Pérez =

Bolivian singer and musician

- Born: Verónica Osffier Pérez Jaime; 4 February 1988 (age 38); La Paz
- Years active: 2011–present

Verónica Osffier Pérez Jaime (born 1988) is a Bolivian musician, singer, and songwriter, who performs under the name Vero Pérez.

== Early life and education ==
Pérez was born in La Paz, Bolivia on 4 February 1988. She went to school at the Franco Boliviano College in La Paz, and attended the Bolivian Catholic University.

== Musical career ==
Pérez's debut album Cadáver Exquisito (Spanish for "Exquisite Corpse") was released in 2020. The tracks on Cadáver Exquisito are poems by nine Bolivian poets set to music and sung by Pérez; the poets are Matilde Casazola, Jaime Sáenz, Adela Zamudio, Roberto Echazú, Blanca Wiethüchter, Julio Barriga, Valeria Canelas, Paola Senseve, and Jessica Freudenthal. To celebrate World Poetry Day in 2024 Pérez performed the album at the Alberto Saavedra Pérez Municipal Theatre and Espacio Kúu Inti in La Paz, backed by a symphony orchestra. Pérez again performed the album backed by a symphony orchestra in two shows on 2 and 3 November 2024, as part of the All Saints' Day celebrations in La Paz. Pérez told Correo del Sur that the idea of performing the album with orchestral backing came about because she felt that on its initial release during the COVID-19 pandemic, the album did not have "sufficiently interesting space."

Pérez has been a member of Bolivian jazz fusion band Efecto Mandarina since 2011, and has also recorded two albums with Bolivian guitarist Jorge Villanueva. In 2020 she recorded a version of the anti-femicide song "Canción Sin Miedo" written by Vivir Quintana, backed by five other Bolivian singers. Pérez has performed with the Miami Symphony Orchestra, and her music featured in the 2020 television series 100 días para enamorarnos.

== Discography ==
=== Albums ===
- Cadáver Exquisito (2020)

With Jorge Villanueva

- Rendez Vous
- Saudade
