= Cielo Veizaga =

Bolivian footballer and politician (born 2001)

Vice Minister of Sports
- In office 17 December 2020 – 14 September 2023
- President: Luis Arce
- Minister: Édgar Pozo; Jeyson Auza; María Renée Castro
- Preceded by: Augusto Chávez

Personal details
- Born: Cielo Jazmín Veizaga Arteaga; 17 March 2001 (age 25) Cochabamba, Bolivia
- Party: Movement for Socialism
- Parent(s): Víctor Veizaga; Roxana Arteaga
- Education: San Antonio de Padua School (BHum)
Association football career
- Height: 1.56 m (5 ft 1 in)
- Position: Forward
International career
| Years | Team | Apps | (Gls) |
| 2015– | Bolivia U20 | 4 | (0) |

Cielo Jazmín Veizaga Arteaga (born 17 March 2001) is a Bolivian footballer and politician serving as vice minister of sports since 2020. Veizaga's swift rise to fame, joining the country's U20 team at age fourteen and becoming the youngest member of President Luis Arce's administration at nineteen, has been met with acclaim despite accusations of inexperience in her State portfolio.

== Early life and football career ==
Cielo Veizaga was born on 17 March 2001 in Cochabamba to Víctor Veizaga, a goalkeeper from the city, and Roxana Arteaga, a track and field athlete from Santa Cruz. Early in her childhood, Veizaga's family moved to Montero, where from the age of ten, she began playing pata pila, a name for football played barefoot. When she was eleven, her mother was murdered, with Veizaga claiming that she was "singled out, just for thinking differently". After that, she continued to pursue a football career with her father, who served as her personal trainer, stating that "I learned to turn pain into strength, talent, and love".

In 2015, Veizaga and her family moved to Ivirgarzama in the Cochabamba tropics, where she trained continually until joining the San Antonio de Padua School team. She gained national recognition as a champion of several Plurinational Student Games and was offered positions among the ranks of Wilstermann, Bolívar, and Mundo Futuro—a component club of Oriente Petrolero—but rejected them in favor of continuing her high school studies. Though not a member of any clubs, in 2015, she was selected to join the women's national under-20 team. Just fourteen years old at the time, she was brought on to gain experience as she was too young to qualify for the team's payroll.

In 2019, U20 manager Napoleón Cardozo selected her to participate in four FIFA friendlies against Puerto Rico in Santa Cruz and Peru in Lima. In August of the same year, she was selected to be captain of the U19 team in the Cotif friendly tournament, which played at L'Alcúdia, Spain. Her performance caught the attention of Valencia CF, which invited her for a one-week tryout, though scheduling problems prevented her from participating. At the end of the year, she graduated with a bachelor's in humanities from the San Antonio de Padua school.

== International goals ==
| No. | Date | Venue | Opponent | Score | Result | Competition |
|---|---|---|---|---|---|---|
| 1. | 14 April 2026 | Estadio Municipal de El Alto, El Alto, Bolivia | Uruguay | 1–1 | 1–2 | 2025–26 CONMEBOL Women's Nations League |

== Vice Minister of Sports ==
On 17 December 2020, Minister of Health Édgar Pozo appointed Veizaga to the post of vice minister of sports. Aged nineteen at the time, she was the youngest minister within the administration of Luis Arce and the youngest person ever to hold a ministerial position in the Bolivian government. At her swearing-in, Pozo highlighted Veizaga's appointment as "fulfilling a debt that is owed to the youth". For her part, Veizaga promised to continue "the achievements of fourteen years of the government of the Movement for Socialism" and pointed toward the sports portfolio as the best way to unify the country. Veizaga's appointment was not universally acclaimed, however. Some social sectors, including the College of Physical Education and Sports Teachers of Cochabamba, criticized her lack of experience and lack of "specialized professional training in the sports area". She responded by stating that she "come from the fields, what more experience is there than that?" and asked that critics "give the youth the opportunity" and "let them show their work".

Upon assuming office, Veizaga criticized the previous transitional government for having left "a dismantled institution". In 2020, the government of Jeanine Áñez demoted the Ministry of Sports to a vice ministry, a move which Veizaga claimed led to debts, abandoned sports centers, and a lack of basic services. As one of its first acts, Veizaga's administration worked to pay off these debts—totaling Bs478,657—as well as reopen and refurbish abandoned sports centers. In early 2022, Veizaga expressed her hope for the Ministry of Sports to be restored "in the very near future", once the public health crisis was no longer a priority.

Veizaga faced criticism of her own when on 19 April 2021, a group of current and former employees of the vice ministry of sports lodged a complaint against the vice minister and demanded her resignation on allegations of poor management and abuse. They alleged that they had been "forced" to work for almost three months without pay and had been charged monthly fees. It was also claimed that Vanessa Veizaga, Cielo's sister, had been allowed to make administrative decisions; "she is the one that handles everything there".

On 8 September 2021, Veizaga announced the launch of the Competitive Sports Development Program (PRODECOM) to provide sustained support for high-performance and promising athletes. The program promised to grant national and international air tickets, manage visas for athlete travel, and provide sportswear, among other aspects. By the end of the year, the program had granted Bs270,000 in financial support to eleven athletes from various disciplines. On 16 March 2022, Veizaga and Bolivian Football Federation (FBF) President Fernando Costa announced joint efforts between the Vice Ministry of Sports and the FBF to establish a professional women's soccer league.

Veizaga resigned on 14 September 2023.

Political offices
| Vacant Title last held by Augusto Chávez | Vice Minister of Sports; 2020–2023 | Succeeded by TBD |
