= Marcela Flores =

Bolivian physician and politician

Minister of Health and Sports
- Incumbent
- Assumed office 9 November 2025
- President: Rodrigo Paz
- Preceded by: María Renée Castro

Personal details
- Born: Marcela Tatiana Flores Zambrana La Paz, Bolivia

Marcela Tatiana Flores Zambrana is a Bolivian physician and politician, Minister of Health and Sports of Bolivia since 2025.

== Career ==
Flores was born in La Paz, Bolivia. She got a PhD in public health and development management and public policy, as well as a master's degree in public health.

Between 2001 and 2020, she was head of the Planning and Organisational Development Unit at Departmental Health Service in La Paz. Flores has been a technical analyst at the UNDP between 2021 and 2022.

During the COVID-19 pandemic in Bolivia, between 2020 and 2021 she coordinated the metropolitan urban area's response of the Departmental Health Service.

She was sworn in Minister of Health and Sports by President Rodrigo Paz on 9 November 2025. On 19 November, she stated that her priorities as minister include improving epidemiological surveillance, promoting health and traditional medicine, strengthening the overall management of the health system, fighting corruption in the health sector, and promoting sports.
