= Beatriz García (politician) =

Bolivian economist, professor and politician

Minister of Education
- In office 9 November 2025 – 2 June 2026
- President: Rodrigo Paz
- Preceded by: Edgar Pary

Personal details
- Born: Beatriz Elena García de Achá
- Education: Notre Dame University; Georgetown University
- Occupation: politician; professor; economist

Beatriz Elena García de Achá is a Bolivian economist, professor and politician. She served as Minister of Education of Bolivia between 2025 and her resignation in 2026 amid nation-wide protests. She has also been professor of the Bolivian Catholic University San Pablo.

== Career ==
García got a degree in economy for the Notre Dame University and a master's degree in business management for the Georgetown University both in the United States.

She developed her professional career in the private sector as a strategic consultant on sustainable development, social entrepreneurship programmes for disadvantaged social sectors, institutional communication, and strategic planning in the finance sector. Until 2025, García ran the company i3impactosocial, which advises, promotes, and finances ventures aimed at disadvantaged sectors. She also headed the Business Council for Sustainable Development in Bolivia.

She is a professor at the Bolivian Catholic University San Pablo and has served on the boards of foundations such as the Foundation for the Conservation of the Chiquitano Forest, BancoSo and the Bolivian Private University.

On 9 November 2025, García was sworn in Minister of Education by President Rodrigo Paz. On June 2, she stepped down amidst nation-wide protests.
