= Cabinet of Rodrigo Paz =

Bolivian presidential administration and ministerial cabinet since 2025

Cabinet of Rodrigo Paz Rodrigo Cabinet
- 223rd Cabinet of the Plurinational State of Bolivia
- 2025–present
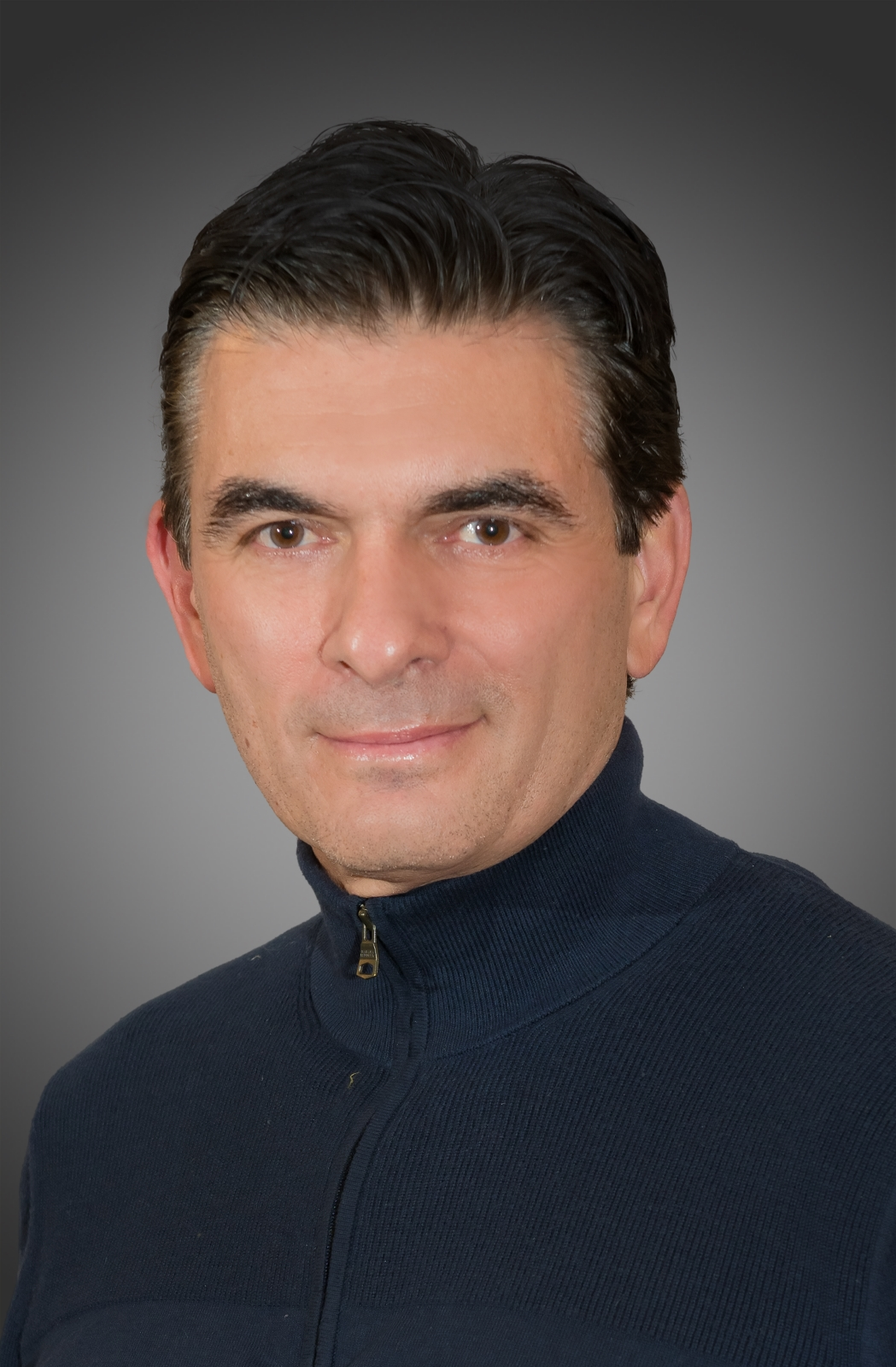
- Date formed: 8 November 2025 (9 months)

People and organisations
- President: Rodrigo Paz Pereira
- Vice President: Edmand Lara
- No. of ministers: 12
- Total no. of members: 21 (incl. former members)
- Member parties: PDC; Libre (Confidence and supply) (Note: Faction); Unity; APB Súmate (Confidence and supply)
- Status in legislature: Majority government
- Opposition party: Libre (Note: Faction); AP; MAS-IPSP; BIA-YUQUI

History
- Election: 2025 general election
- Legislature term: 2025–2030 Plurinational Legislative Assembly
- Predecessor: Cabinet of Luis Arce

The Cabinet of Rodrigo Paz constitutes the 223rd cabinet of the Plurinational State of Bolivia. It was formed on 8 November 2025 after Rodrigo Paz Pereira was sworn in as the 68th President of Bolivia, following the 2025 general election, succeeding the Arce Cabinet. Paz announced that he would reduce his cabinet from 17 to 12 ministries as part of a policy of austerity and state efficiency.

== Transition ==
The transfer of presidential power between the outgoing government of Luis Arce and the incoming government of Rodrigo Paz began on October 22, 2025, and concluded on November 8, 2025, after his swearing-in before the Legislative Assembly.

=== Transitional cabinet ===
After becoming president elect, Rodrigo Paz announced that José Luis Lupo and Gabriel Espinoza would be part of his governing team. They immediately traveled to the United States to meet with leaders of the International Monetary Fund (IMF), World Bank, the Inter-American Development Bank, and United States Secretary of State, Marco Rubio.

== Inauguration ==
The official inauguration ceremony for the President and Vice President of Bolivia took place on November 8, 2025, in the city of La Paz (the seat of government of Bolivia).

== Cabinet ==
On November 9, 2025, president Paz swore in new ministers of the Plurinational State of Bolivia, while announcing that some ministries would be merged into others.

	Ministry		Minister	Party	Start	End
1		Ministry of the Presidency	José Luis Lupo	Bloque de Unidad	9 November 2025	3 August 2026
1		Ministry of the Presidency	Fernando Aramayo	Ind.	3 August 2026	In office
2		Ministry of Economy and Public Finances	José Gabriel Espinoza	Bloque de Unidad	9 November 2025	21 August 2026
2		Ministry of Economy and Public Finances	José Gabriel Espinoza	Ind.	9 November 2025	21 August 2026
2		Ministry of Economy and Public Finances	Oscar Mario Justiniano Pinto (interim)	Ind.	21 August 2026	In office
3		Ministry of Foreign Affairs	Fernando Aramayo	Ind.	9 November 2025	3 August 2026
3		Ministry of Foreign Affairs	Héctor Huanca	Ind.	3 August 2026	In office
4		Ministry of Government	Marco Antonio Oviedo	Movimiento de Izquierda Revolucionaria (Bolivia)	9 November 2025	In office
5		Ministry of Defense	Raúl Marcelo Salinas	Bloque de Unidad	9 November 2025	2 June 2026
5		Ministry of Defense	Ernesto Justiniano	Bloque de Unidad	2 June 2026	In office
6		Ministry of Hydrocarbons and Energies	Marcelo Blanco	Ind.	22 April 2026	In office
7		Ministry of Education	Beatriz Elena García de Achá	Ind.	9 November 2025	2 June 2026
8		Ministry of Production, Rural Development, and Water	Oscar Mario Justiniano Pinto (interim)	Ind.	9 November 2025	In office
9		Ministry of Labor, Employment, and Social Security	Edgar Morales Mamani	Democracia Directa (Bolivia)	9 November 2025	21 May 2026
9		Ministry of Labor, Employment, and Social Security	Williams José Bascopé	APB Súmate	21 May 2026	In office
10		Ministry of Health and Sports	Marcela Flores	Primero la Gente (Bolivia)	9 November 2025	In office
11		Ministry of Public Works, Services, and Housing	Mauricio Zamora Liebers	Primero la Gente (Bolivia)	9 November 2025	In office
12		Ministry of Mining and Metallurgy	Marco Antonio Calderón	Ind.	9 November 2025	In office
-	Closed Ministries	Ministry of Justice	Freddy Vidovic	Nuevas Ideas con Libertad	9 November 2025	20 November 2025
-	Closed Ministries	Ministry of Justice	Jorge Franz García Pinto (interim)	Primero la Gente (Bolivia)	20 November 2025	20 November 2025
-	Closed Ministries	Ministry of Rural Development (Bolivia)	José Luis Lupo (interim)	Bloque de Unidad	9 November 2025	8 July 2026
-	Closed Ministries	Ministerio de Culturas, Descolonización y Despatriarcalización	Jorge Franz García (interim)	Primero la Gente (Bolivia)	9 November 2025	8 July 2026
-	Closed Ministries	Ministry of Planning and Development	José Fernando Romero Pinto	Ind.	9 November 2025	8 July 2026
-	Closed Ministries	Ministry of Tourism and Gastronomy	Cinthya Martha Yáñez Eid	Bloque de Unidad	9 November 2025	8 July 2026

=== Armed Forces ===
On 13 November 2025, president Paz swore in the new High Command of the Armed Forces of Bolivia, designating General Víctor Hugo Balderrama Quezada as Commander in Chief, General Héctor Alejandro Alarcón Antezana as Commander of the Army, General Sergio Fernando Lora Araoz as Commander of the Air Force and Counter Admiral Ernesto Adalid Alfaro Palma as Commander of the Navy.
