= Fernando Aramayo =

Bolivian economist and politician

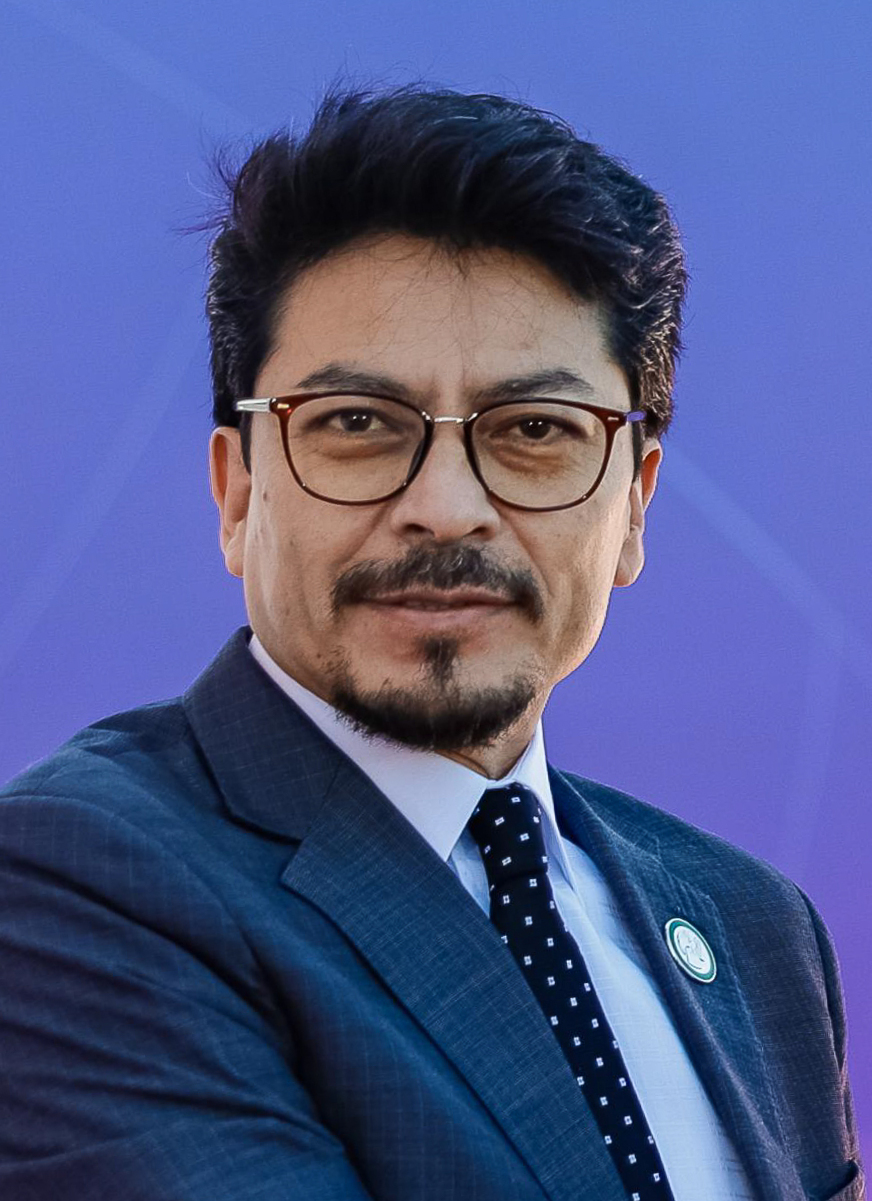
- Fernando Aramayo in 2025

Foreign Minister of Bolivia
- Incumbent
- Assumed office 9 November 2025
- President: Rodrigo Paz
- Preceded by: Celinda Sosa Lunda

Personal details
- Born: Fernando Hugo Aramayo Carrasco; 19 February 1974 (age 52) La Paz, Bolivia
- Education: Bolivian Catholic University San Pablo

Fernando Hugo Aramayo Carrasco (born 19 February 1974) is a Bolivian economist who has served as Minister of Foreign Affairs since 9 November 2025, in the government of Rodrigo Paz. Previously, he held the position of Coordinator of Programs and Institutional Management for the United Nations Development Programme in Bolivia.

== Biography ==
=== Professional career ===
Aramayo was previously responsible for significant national processes, such as the 2006 Constituent Assembly, as well as his role as Technical Secretary of the 2001 National Population and Housing Census.

He has worked for various development cooperation agencies, including the German Society for International Cooperation, PNUD, the Inter-American Development Bank, the World Bank, the Swedish International Development Cooperation Agency, and others, as well as for non-profit organizations. He has worked in North America (United States and Mexico), South America (Bolivia, Colombia, Ecuador, and Peru), Central America (Honduras, Guatemala, and El Salvador), the Middle East (Israel, Palestine, and Turkey), and Africa (Kenya).

=== Government career ===
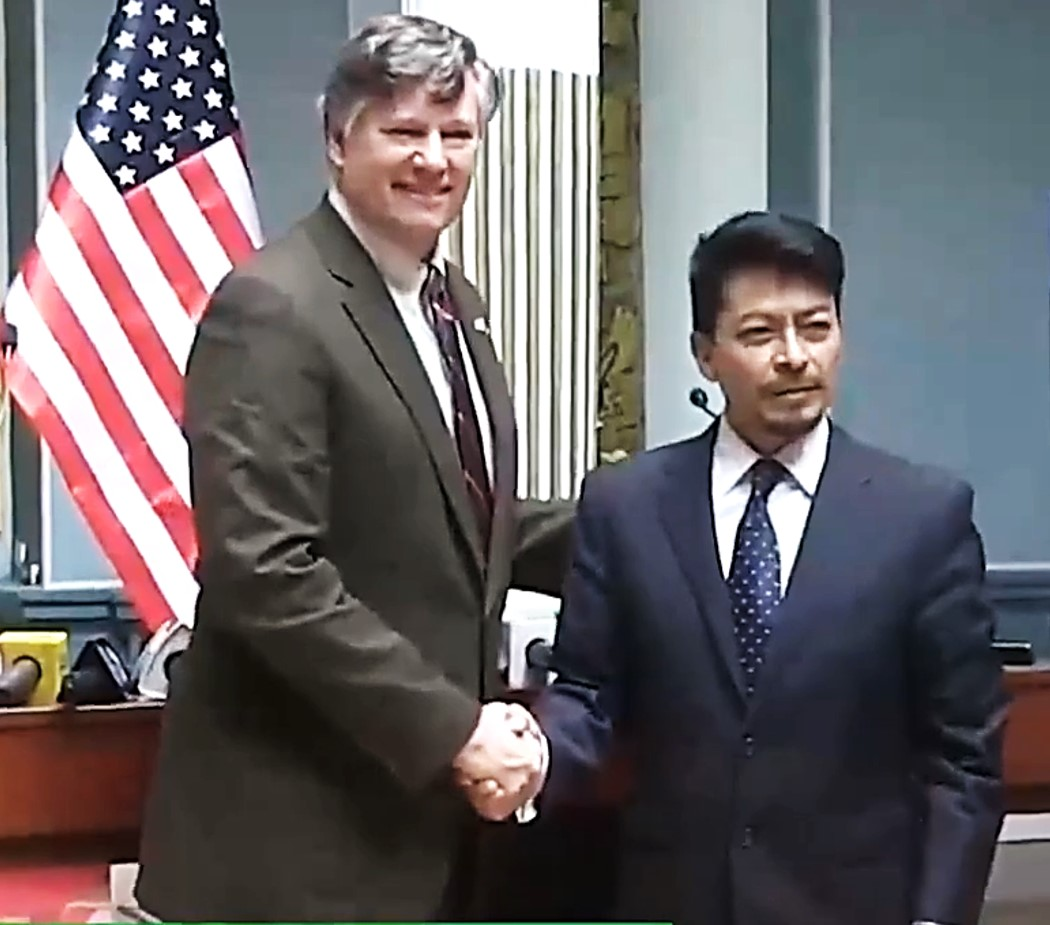
Aramayo in a personal meeting with the United States Under Secretary of State (Deputy Foreign Minister) Christopher Landau, in November 2025 in the city of La Paz.

On 9 November 2025, he was appointed by President Rodrigo Paz as Minister of Foreign Affairs of Bolivia.

Previously, on 8 November 2025, Aramayo met personally with United States Deputy Secretary of State Christopher Landau, marking a diplomatic shift in Bolivia-U.S. relations and a complete rethinking of Bolivian foreign policy. This change contrasts sharply with the decision of former President Evo Morales, who in September 2008 expelled U.S. Ambassador Philip Goldberg after accusing him of conspiring with the opposition to overthrow his government.
