= Cinthya Yáñez =

Bolivian businesswoman and politician

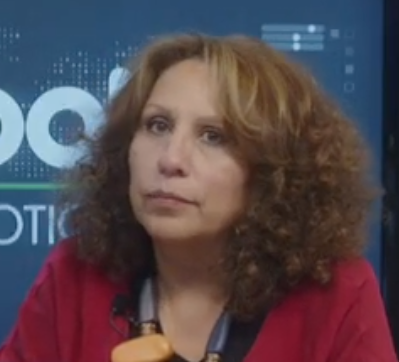
- In a 2026 interview

Minister without portfolio responsible for Tourism and Gastronomy
- In office 9 November 2025 – 8 July 2026
- President: Rodrigo Paz

Personal details
- Born: Cinthya Martha Yáñez Eid

Cinthya Martha Yáñez Eid is a Bolivian businesswoman and politician. She served as minister without portfolio responsible for tourism and gastronomy of Bolivia between 2025 and 2026. She served as deputy minister of tourism in 2003.

== Career ==
Yañez was Deputy Minister of Tourism in 2003, directing policies to promote domestic tourism. She developed her professional career in the private sector in companies such as Sociedad Hotelera Los Tajibos S.A. and the Doria Medina Foundation, where she led competitions promoting the creation of businesses and entrepreneurship. She was financial manager of the HOY newspaper and other companies.

In the 2025 general elections, she was the lead delegate for the Alianza Unidad party.

She was sworn in Minister without portfolio responsible for Tourism and Gastronomy by President Rodrigo Paz on 9 November 2025. She stated that one of her goals is to have two million tourists visit the country by 2026.

She resigned on 8 July 2026 due to personal reasons.
