= Edgar Montaño =

Bolivian politician

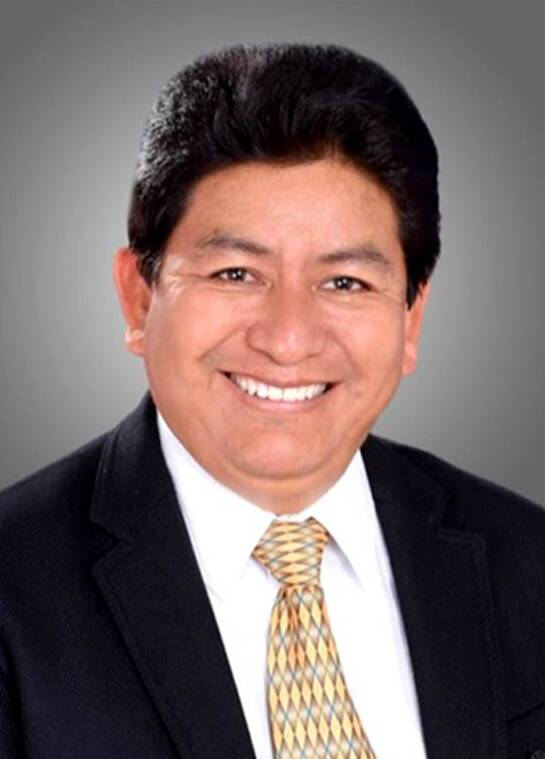

Minister of Public Works, Services, and Housing
- Incumbent
- Assumed office 9 November 2020
- President: Luis Arce
- Preceded by: Iván Arias Durán

Member of the Chamber of Deputies from Santa Cruz
- In office 22 January 2015 – 3 November 2020
- Constituency: Circumscription 50

Personal details
- Born: Edgar Montaño Rojas; 23 August 1971 (age 54) Santa Cruz, Bolivia
- Party: MAS-IPSP

Edgar Montaño Rojas (born 23 August 1971) is a Bolivian engineer and politician serving as the Minister of Public Works, Services, and Housing under the government of Luis Arce. He was previously a member of the Chamber of Deputies for Santa Cruz.

== Career ==
Montaño was appointed Minister of Public Works by President Luis Arce on 9 November 2020. On 11 January 2021, Montaño became the third member of the Arce cabinet to contract COVID-19, amid the second-wave of the virus in the country. After two weeks, Montaño returned to his duties on 25 January.

Political offices
Preceded by Iván Arias Durán	Minister of Public Works, Services, and Housing; 2020-present	Succeeded by Incumbent
