= Vivir Quintana =

Mexican singer and composer (born 1985)

- Quintana at the 2026 Latin Grammy Awards
- Born: Viviana Monserrat Quintana Rodríguez; September 17, 1985 (age 41); Francisco I. Madero, Coahuila, Mexico
- Education: Escuela Superior de Música, Escuela Normal Superior del Estado de Coahuila
- Occupations: singer, interpreter
- Parent: Gloria Rodríguez (mother) Tomás Quintana (father)

Vivir Quintana (born Viviana Monserrat Quintana Rodríguez; Francisco I. Madero, Coahuila; 1985) is a Mexican singer and composer. Quintana penned the song "Canción sin miedo", or Song without Fear, which has become a feminist hymn against gendered violence and femicide.

== Background ==
Viviana Monserrat Quintana Rodríguez was born in Francisco I. Madero, Coahuila, Mexico in 1985 to Gloria Rodríguez, a retired educator in social sciences and geography and Tomás Quintana, a mathematics professor. She has two brothers.

Quintana comes from a musical family, as her grandmother was also a singer but did not pursue in career in music due to opposition from her parents. Quintana began to play the guitar when she was 12 years old; she was taught her first chords in a community park by a local carpenter. At this same age, she became aware that she could sing when she performed the song Paloma Negra by Tomás Méndez.

When she was 17 years old, Quintana began her academic studies at the Escuela Superior de Música in Saltillo, Coahuila, Mexico. She also completed a bachelor's degree in Spanish at the Escuela Normal Superior del Estado de Coahuila. For three years, Quintana was a middle school Spanish teacher where she would use music as a pedagogical tool. During this time, she would also play in various bars.

== Musical career ==
Quintana's music is a blend of Mexican Regional Music and folk music. She has composed more than 150 songs and has shared the stage with renowned singers such as Armando Manzanero, Mauricio Díaz Hueso, and Imma Serrano, among others. While Quintana's songs center around common themes such as love, her songs also speak on femicides, particularly those cases that have not yet achieved justice. Quintana has stated that her creative process involves writing the music at the same time as writing the lyrics to her songs.

In 2004, Quintana was selected to represent Mexico in the International Festival of the Arts in Europe: Belgium, Italy, and the Netherlands.

Quintana is one of the founders of the project Las Hijas de Libertina Hernández, a collective that seeks to amplify the voices and works of female singers and artists.

Quintana has also completed the project "Rosita Alvirez, maté a Hipólito", with support from the Programa de Estímulo a la Creación y Desarrollo Artístico of Coahuila, which is a series of corridos told in first-person that speak to the cases of women who killed their aggressors in self-defense.

In 2020, she was listed in Forbes México's 100 Creative Mexicans for her musical works. In 2024, she was presented with the Leading Ladies of Entertainment award by the Latin Recording Academy.

=== Canción Sin Miedo ===
Vivir Quintana composed "Canción sin miedo" as a commission from Mon Laferte, who was scheduled for a performance in Mexico City on March 7, 2020, as part of the musical festival, "Tiempo de Mujeres, Festival por la Igualdad," in commemoration of International Women's Day. The song became viral before its public performance at the festival through the messaging app, WhatsApp.

Canción Sin Miedo was featured in the ending credits of the Netflix original documentary film The Three Deaths of Marisela Escobedo, which details the story of Marisela Escobedo Ortiz, a mother from Ciudad Juárez who was murdered while seeking justice for the killing of her daughter, Rubí Frayre.

== Discography ==
=== Singles ===
- Enamorada (2018)
- La Casita de la Selva (2019)
- Yo Te Espero (2019)
- Huracán Kathy (2020) with Silvia Palumbo & Desbandadas
- Canción Sin Miedo (2020) with Mon Laferte
- No Estás Sola - Llamadas de Emergencia (2020) with Snowapple & El Palomar
- Llora Llora (2021) with La Catrina Son System & Nana Mendoza

=== Compilations ===
- Yo Vengo a Ofrecer Mi Corazón (2020) as part of Las Voces de Latinoamérica
- Gracias a La Vida (2020) as part of Las Voces de Latinoamérica
