= Édgar Pozo =

Bolivian cardiologist and politician

Édgar Pozo Valdivia
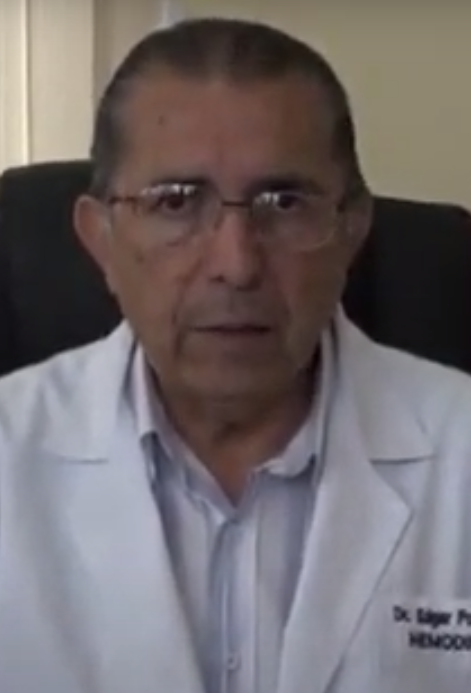

Minister of Health and Sports
- In office 19 November 2020 – 16 January 2021
- President: Luis Arce
- Preceded by: Himself (as Minister of Health)
- Succeeded by: Jeyson Auza

Minister of Health
- In office 9 November 2020 – 19 November 2020
- President: Luis Arce
- Preceded by: María Eidy Roca
- Succeeded by: Himself (as Minister of Health and Sports)

Personal details
- Born: 1948 (age 77–78)
- Education: Higher University of San Andrés

Édgar Pozo Valdivia (born 1948) is a Bolivian cardiologist, who served as the Minister of Health and Sports from 9 November 2020 until 16 January 2021 when he was forced to leave office after contracting COVID-19. He is a member of the Bolivian Society of Cardiology and of the Latin American Society of Interventional Cardiology, and of other health institutions.

== Biography ==
Pozo completed professional studies at the Higher University of San Andrés and postgraduate studies at the National Thorax Institute of La Paz. Pozo began his health career in 1975 when he did his first medical residency. He did another at the Favaloro Foundation in Argentina before working as a cardiology doctor. Between 1989 and 1993, Pozo served as Deputy Minister of Social Security before returning to his work as a doctor at the end of his term. From 2000 to 2002, he was President of the Caja Nacional de Caminos and served as head of the Hemodynamics Service and Cardiology Department.

In 2016, he was appointed director of the National Thorax Institute (INT) where he worked to improve the conditions of the health system and denounced the shortcomings that made it difficult to care for patients. As director of the INT, he worked to combat the COVID-19 pandemic in Bolivia.

== Minister of Health (2020–2021) ==
On 9 November 2020, President Luis Arce appointed Pozo to the position of Minister of Health. On 29 November, he was met with controversy surrounding his apparent endorsement of the consumption of chlorine dioxide, also known as "Miracle Mineral Solution," to treat COVID-19. The toxic substance had been hailed by proponents of alternative medicine as a miracle cure to the virus. At a press conference, Pozo described the usage of chlorine dioxide as "permissible" and announced that the ministry would conduct a study into its use in order to "produce a broader knowledge about its benefits." Pozo's comments were feared to have added fuel to the popularity of the toxic substance in Bolivia where in the absence of widely available healthcare, many had embraced the toxic material.

Pozo was met with further controversy on 7 December when Minister of Justice Iván Lima reported that he had questioned the Health Minister surrounding the hiring of his son, Edgar Pozo Goytia, as legal adviser to the National Health Fund (CNS). Lima called the appointment a "serious irregularity" but stated that "we are not going to judge, we want the facts." Soon after, the head of Human Resources of the CNS, Paola Monje, denied there had been outside influence or nepotism in the institution and stated that Pozo Goytia had voluntarily resigned.

=== COVID-19 ===
On 15 January 2021, it was announced that Pozo had tested positive for COVID-19, becoming the fourth government minister to do so. At age 72, Pozo was deemed to be of greater risk of dying from the disease. As a result, the next day President Arce announced that Pozo had decided to "step aside" and that he would be replaced as Minister of Health by Jeyson Marcos Auza Pinto.

Two days after retiring, Poza went into a medically induced coma for 45 days during which he suffered from cardiac arrhythmias and hypertensive crisis. On 28 January, the Chamber of Senators erroneously released a statement regretting that Pozo had died. The news release was denied the same day by Pozo's son and retracted the following day. Pozo was discharged from the National Thorax Institute on 9 April.

Political offices
Preceded by María Eidy Roca	Minister of Health; 2020	Succeeded by Himself as Minister of Health and Sports
Preceded by Himself as Minister of Health	Minister of Health and Sports; 2020–2021	Succeeded by Jeyson Auza
