= Adrián Quelca =

Bolivian Minister of Education (2020–2021)

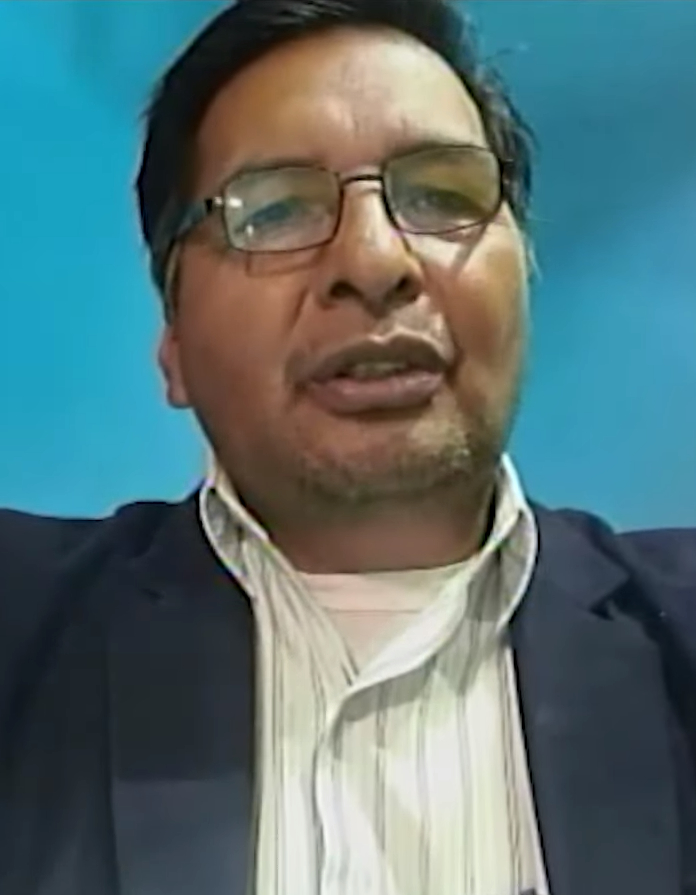

Minister of Education
- In office 19 November 2020 – 12 November 2021 (Note: After his resignation, Quelca continued to perform ministerial functions in an unclear, semi-official capacity until 19 November.)
- President: Luis Arce
- Preceded by: Himself
- Succeeded by: Edgar Pary

Minister of Education, Sports, and Cultures
- In office 9 November 2020 – 19 November 2020
- President: Luis Arce
- Preceded by: Víctor Hugo Cárdenas
- Succeeded by: Himself

Personal details
- Born: Adrián Rubén Quelca Tarqui; 30 November 1967 (age 58) Pacajes Province, La Paz, Bolivia
- Party: Communist (1989–present)
- Education: José Manuel Pando School; Antonio Diaz Villamil School; Simón Bolivar Higher School of Teacher Training

Adrián Rubén Quelca Tarqui (born 30 November 1967) is a Bolivian politician, professor, and trade unionist who served as minister of education from 2020 to 2021. A member of the Communist Party, Quelca worked to implement a project for a "semi-present" school system in which partial in-person learning would be coupled with radio and tele-education. Under his management, schools previously closed early by the past administration were reopened to blended learning for the 2021 year. Despite initial hopes for fully in-person classes by the second half of the year, results never panned out, and his administration was hampered by an ongoing corruption investigation that ultimately culminated in the presentation of charges and his resignation on 12 November 2021.

== Early life and career ==
Adrián Quelca was born on 30 November 1967 in the Pacajes Province of the La Paz Department. His father was a rural school teacher. He concluded his primary studies at the Antonio Diaz Villamil School in La Paz and served in the 23rd Max Toledo Infantry Regiment of the town of Viacha before entering the Simón Bolívar Higher School to study to become a teacher. Graduating with a degree in social studies, he began his career in 1992, working as a teacher at the José Ballivian de Viacha, Santo Domingo, and Gualberto Villarroel schools. After serving in several managerial roles at various education institutions, including working as the principal of the Alto Posnaski School in Tiwanaku, he returned to the Simón Bolívar Higher School as a professor in social studies.

In addition to his education career, Quelca was active in trade union activity and has been a member of the Communist Party of Bolivia (PCB) since 1989, serving as secretary and later national executive secretary of the Confederation of Urban Education Workers until 2016, when he joined the Bolivian Workers' Center as a cultural consultant. In 2018, he returned to the Simón Bolívar Higher School to serve as its rector, a position he held until 2020.

== Minister of Education ==
On 9 November 2020, President Luis Arce appointed Quelca minister of education, sports, and cultures. He remained in that post for ten days until 19 November, when the president ratified him as minister of education, reassigning the cultures and sports portfolios to other ministries. In the initial days of his term, Quelca faced criticism for his social media remarks, specifically the use of obscene language directed towards opposition leaders, including calling transitional president Jeanine Áñez "a fucking thief" and opposition leader Carlos Mesa a "beggar". In addition, critics noted numerous spelling and orthographic errors, including a lack of punctuation and accent marks. As a result, Quelca permanently closed his Twitter account.

=== "Semi-present" education plan ===
In mid-November, Quelca announced the ministry's intention to return schools to face-to-face learning after the previous administration suspended them in March due to coronavirus concerns. Quelca explained that it was "necessary to resume contact between teachers and students" and outlined a blended learning program in which students would be divided into two groups attending in-person schools every other day for three days. The plan was presented to parents, teachers, and trade unions at the 6th Pedagogical Meeting, which convened in La Paz from 17 to 18 December. The convention agreed to the "semi-present" system for the 2021 quarter, with in-person schools being complemented by radio and tele-education as well as the use of virtual platforms "depending on the sanitary conditions ... corresponding to each context".

Despite initial cooperation, the Urban Magisterium Federation broke dialogue with the Ministry of Education on 19 January 2021 due to the lack of progress on their demand for a larger budget. Despite this, Quelca announced the following week that the date for the reopening of classes would be 1 February and outlined his hope that the arrival of vaccines would allow for the return of full face-to-face classes by the second semester. Three weeks after the resumption of classes, Quelca signed an agreement with thirteen media outlets for the broadcasting of classes through television and radio.

=== Exam trafficking and resignation ===
On 26 July 2021, Vice Minister of Higher Education Aurea Balderrama formalized a criminal complaint against Quelca as well as the former general director of higher education, Agustín Tarifa, for influence peddling in the appointment of managerial positions of the Plurinational Educational System in the first months of the administration. The document alleged that Quelca had instructed Tarifa to favor certain people of the Communist Party and hinder other applicants, pointing to leaked WhatsApp messages as evidence. In what Página Siete called "the most controversial case of 'shenanigans' that has ever been talked about in Bolivia", the newspaper broke the case that, between February and May, Quelca had aided in the approval of at least forty-six applicants from all nine departments to managerial, teaching, and administrative positions by directing Tarifa to give them the answers to the exams of institutionalization. Lawyer Abel Loma, representing Balderrama in the case, called the scheme a "vulgar act of scam at the national level". Notably, the ongoing corruption was revealed to have been known by at least three ministries, all of whom were awaiting authorization and instructions from the General Command of the Police, which never came.

Following the news, Tarifa was apprehended on 21 September and incarcerated in San Pedro prison. A little over a month later, on 11 November, the Prosecutor's Office formally charged Quelca with the crime of breach of duties. In a document signed by prosecutor Rocío Feraudi, Quelca was named as the probable author or participant in the corruption scheme. The prosecution recommended Quelca be placed under house arrest under the justification that his continued freedom presented a flight risk and would allow him to negatively influence witnesses who had not yet testified. Despite denying the accusations as "slander", Quelca nonetheless presented his resignation on the same day, claiming that he had done so in "clear conscience" in order to avoid negative attention being drawn to the government. Vice Minister Balderrama later called Quelca "cowardly", claiming that the minister had laid off her entire staff even a few hours after his resignation. Five days later, Quelca affirmed that, despite his resignation, he had not yet received a response from the president, and it was reported that he was continuing to perform ministerial acts a full week after. In response to this, presidential spokesman Jorge Richter stated that a new minister would be appointed "in the next few days".

Following Quelca's ouster, personnel of the ministry disclosed that two camps, both from the MAS, had begun a struggle for power within the institution. Among supporters of Quelca, there was hope for the possibility that he could return to head the ministry either by being reappointed or by the rejection of his resignation by the president. Opponents within the department, as well as several teachers' unions, called for his speedy replacement in order for the new minister to quickly tackle urgent matters. On 19 November, one week after Quelca's resignation, President Arce appointed Edgar Pary as the new minister of education. Days prior, viewing that Pary was his likely successor, Quelca initiated a criminal process against him. The complaint alleged that Pary had not met the teaching tenure requirements to become a member of the Subdirectorate of Higher Education of Tarija, a position he had been in the process of applying to prior to being appointed minister. The Prosecutor's Office dismissed the process after Pary proved he had six years of teaching experience in Potosí.

In the few hours before his successor was sworn in, Quelca issued Memorandum N° 121808, appointing himself and twelve close associates from the PCB to professorial positions in the higher schools of study. Other than himself, those appointed included his former chief of staff, Ernesto Misme; the former legal director, Samuel Coaquira; and the former head of transparency, Luis Nina. On 25 November, all the self-appointments were annulled. In addition, the profusion of dismissals of ministry officials that Quelca had issued in his final days were paralyzed.

On 4 July 2022, nearly a year after the exam trafficking case was opened, the Prosecutor's Office dismissed all charges levied against the former minister. In response, Balderrama ratified her initial complaint and announced her intention to open a private suit for slander and libel against Quelca and his lawyer, Mary Carrasco.

Political offices
Preceded by Víctor Hugo Cárdenas	Minister of Education, Sports, and Cultures; 2020	Succeeded by Himself
Preceded by Himself	Minister of Education; 2020–2021	Succeeded by Edgar Pary
