= Celinda Sosa Lunda =

Bolivian politician

Cecilia Sosa Lunda
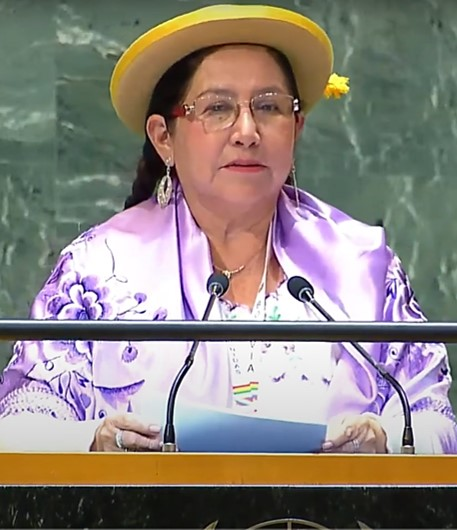
- Sosa Lunda in 2024

Minister of Foreign Affairs
- In office 27 November 2023 – 9 November 2025
- President: Luis Arce
- Preceded by: Rogelio Mayta
- Succeeded by: Fernando Hugo Aramayo Carrasco

Minister of Production and Microenterprises
- In office 2006–2007
- President: Evo Morales

Personal details
- Born: Celinda Sosa Lunda; 13 October 1963 (age 62) Yesera, Cercado, Tarija, Bolivia
- Party: Movement for Socialism (MAS)

Celinda Sosa Lunda (born 13 October 1963) is a Bolivian politician serving as the Minister of Foreign Affairs of Bolivia since 27 November 2023 until 9 November 2025.

== Biography ==
Sosa Lunda was born on 13 October 1963 in Yesera, Cercado in the Tarija Department. In 1986 she founded the Rural Women's Training and Research Center and was its executive director from 1988 to 2006.

Sosa Lunda is a member of the Movement for Socialism (MAS) of Evo Morales and has served as the minister of production and microenterprises from 2006 to 2007.

In 2008 she was the presidential representative in the Tarija Department until the creation of the Departmental Coordination Office of Autonomies in this department, which she joined as director from 2009 to 2013. She worked in the Departmental Government of Tarija from 2013 to 2015, where she chaired the Secretariat of Social Development and addressed health, gender, education and social assistance policies.

Sosa Lunda was part of the Productive Development Bank (BDP) as the vice president of the board of directors.

=== Minister of Foreign Affairs ===
On 27 November 2023, Sosa Lunda was appointed minister of foreign affairs of Bolivia by President Luis Arce.
