= Canción sin miedo =

Feminist song by Vivir Quintana

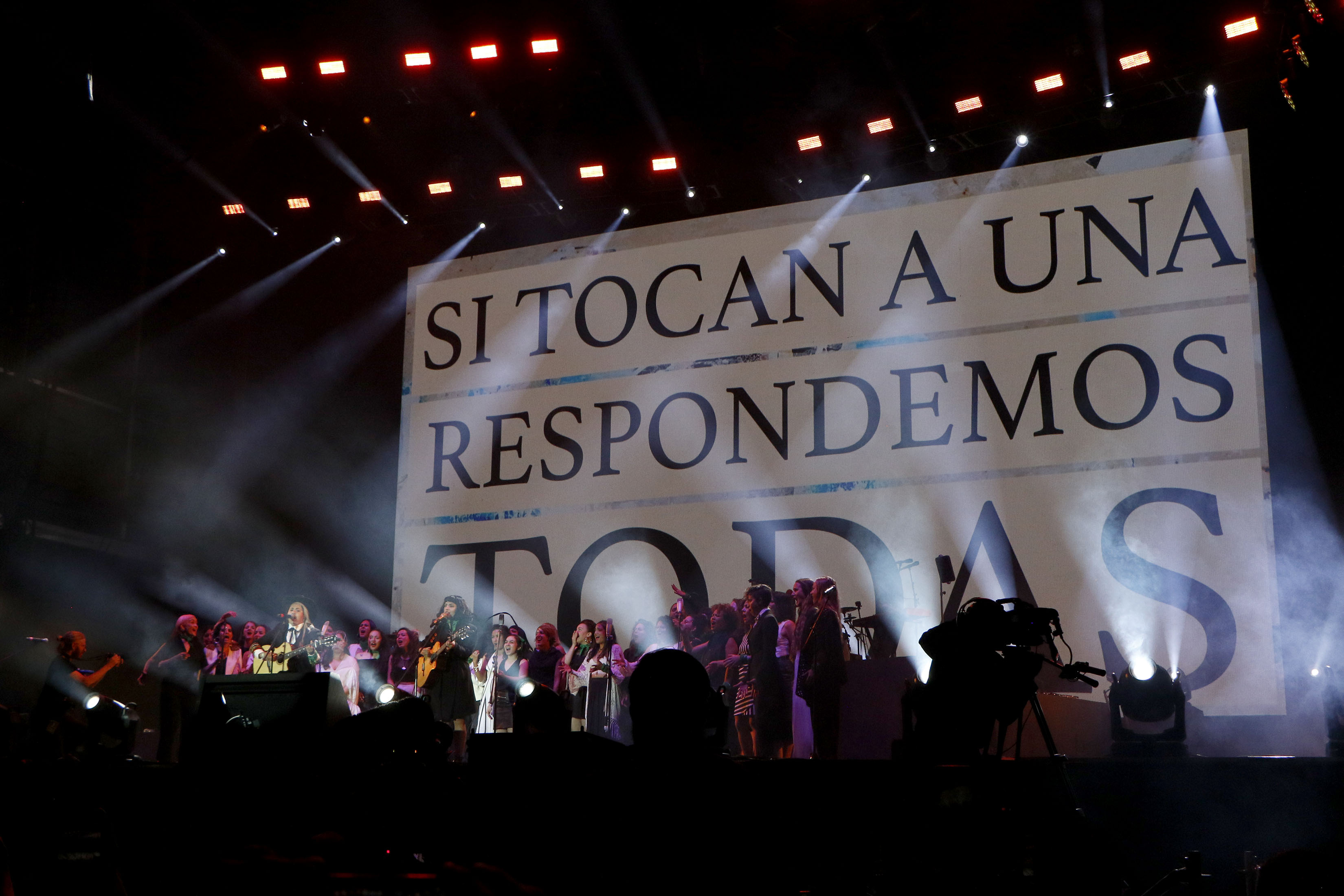
The premiere of "Canción sin miedo" by Mon Laferte, Vivir Quintana, and the "El Palomar" women's choir, Mexico City, March 7, 2020.

"Canción sin miedo" ("Song without fear" in Spanish) is a regional Mexican song by Mexican composer and singer Vivir Quintana, first performed on March 7, 2020. It speaks of missing women, feminicides, and women's struggle for justice, and has become an anthem for feminist protests.

== Origin ==
On February 25, 2020, Chilean musician Mon Laferte asked Vivir Quintana if she would be interested in writing a song about femicide and performing it in the historic Zócalo square in Mexico City on March 7, 2020, the day of the Marche mondiale des Femmes and the eve of International Women's Day. Quintana reportedly wrote the song in 9–10 hours on the same day, also drawing inspiration from the feminicide of a friend in Coahuila.

"Canción sin miedo" was first released on Quintana's YouTube channel on March 7, 2020, performed in collaboration with the "El Palomar" women's choir, with a choral arrangement by Chilean chorister Paz Court. Later that day, Laferte joined the group in performing the song at Zócalo as part of the Tiempo de Mujeres (Women's Hour) festival. The song was repeated during feminist rallies the following day.

== Reception ==
The original YouTube video garnered 330,000 views in the first two days after its release and 20 million by March 2023. The Mexican newspaper Vanguardia has described the song as "a call for a revolutionary awakening".

Notable performances of the song include at the occupation of the National Human Rights Commission of Mexico in September 2020; in the 2020 Netflix documentary, "Las tres muertes de Marisela Escobedo (The Three Deaths of Marisela Escobedo)", about the assassination of Mexican activist Marisela Escobedo Ortiz in 2010; and during the protests and funeral following the murder of Ecuadorian lawyer María Belén Bernal in September 2022.

The song has been performed all over the world, including in Argentina, Chile, Colombia, Ecuador, Spain, Honduras, Peru, Greece, and France. In December 2020, the song was partially translated into Mayan and adapted for a Yucatán context. This adaptation was released as a music video by Belle Delouisse. In 2021, a mariachi version was released, performed by students from the Escuela de Mariachi Ollin Yoliztli. In 2022, Quintana translated it into Tlahuitoltepec, an Ayuujk or Mixe language spoken in Oaxaca.

== Lyrics ==
A cada minuto, de cada semana
Nos roban amigas, nos matan hermanas
Destrozan sus cuerpos, los desaparecen
No olvide sus nombres, por favor, señor presidente
Cantamos sin miedo, pedimos justicia
Gritamos por cada desaparecida
Que resuene fuerte "¡nos queremos vivas!"
Que caiga con fuerza el feminicida

— Excerpt from the song

The song describes the Mexican reality of violence against women, including disappearances and femicides, and also talks about the struggle of women for justice. In the words of the composer:

It is a case study of how pain really makes us so close. It connects us women, not only in Mexico, but also in Latin America and the whole world. It is like an oxymoron of sweet joy but also bitter sweetness.

In an interview with Milenio a year after the song's release, Quintana said:

I'm very happy that the song has spread and people like it, but on the other hand, it hurts me that it's for the same story, over and over again. But it has let me connect with the women who fight, the woman who has the courage to go out in the street to put her body, her hands, her face in service of the fight. So now I can say that "Canción sin miedo" has given me a broader perspective on what it means to be a woman in Mexico.
