= Edgar Pary =

Bolivian Minister of Education (2021–present)

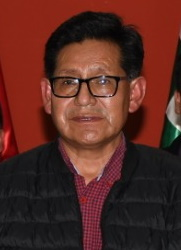

Minister of Education
- In office 19 November 2021 – 9 November 2025
- President: Luis Arce
- Preceded by: Adrián Quelca
- Succeeded by: Beatriz García de Achá

Personal details
- Born: Edgar Pary Chambi Caiza "D", Potosí, Bolivia
- Party: Movement for Socialism
- Relatives: Diego Pary Rodríguez
- Education: Caiza "D" Normal School
- Occupation: Politician; professor

Edgar Pary Chambi is a Bolivian politician and university professor who served as minister of education between 2021 and 2025. A member of the Movement for Socialism, he previously served as the general director of higher education, technological, linguistic, and artistic techniques within the Ministry of Education and was the department director of education in Potosí from 2011 to 2012.

== Early life and career ==
Edgar Pary was born in Caiza "D", Potosí, where he graduated as a teacher from the local normal school. A member of the Movement for Socialism (MAS-IPSP), he was noted as being politically oriented towards the hard wing of the party. In particular, he held close relations with former mining minister César Navarro, former deputy Víctor Borda, as well as former foreign minister Diego Pary Rodríguez, with whom he also holds familial ties. Between 2011 and 2012, Pary served as the departmental director of education in Potosí before joining the Ministry of Education as the general director of higher education, technological, linguistic, and artistic techniques during the administration of Roberto Aguilar.

On 6 July 2021, during the administration of Adrián Quelca, Pary filed a lawsuit against the minister for breach of duties concerning an exam trafficking scandal that ultimately culminated in Quelca's resignation on 12 November. In the interim, between presenting his resignation and its formal acceptance by President Luis Arce, Quelca —viewing Pary as his likely successor— filed an administrative and criminal proceeding against him. The complaint alleged that Pary, who at the time was in the process of applying to be deputy director of higher education in Tarija, did not meet the teaching qualifications to hold the position. The Prosecutor's Office quickly dismissed the motion after Pary presented evidence that he had been a professor in Potosí for six years.

== Minister of Education ==
A week after Quelca's resignation, President Arce appointed Pary as the new minister of education on 19 November 2021. Upon assuming office, Pary pledged to coordinate with social organizations, teachers' confederations, parents, and student representatives to improve the education sector in the face of the COVID-19 pandemic.

In late 2021, Pary announced that the regular school year would be initiated on 1 February 2022 under three modalities: face-to-face, blended, and distance learning, dependent on the severity of the pandemic in each locale. By that date, the fourth wave of the pandemic compelled the Ministry of Education to impose distance learning on all nine departmental capital cities, with the ability of rural school districts to opt for face-to-face classes based on their individual epidemiological situations. Given the low inoculation rate among school-age children —just forty percent— Pary implored parents to promote the vaccination of their progeny in order to hasten the return to in-person schooling. By early March, Pary reported that more than ninety percent of academic units had chosen to resume partial or full face-to-face instruction once school reconvened from the carnival holiday.

On 19 February, the Ministry of Education met with representatives from the Confederation of Urban Education Workers of Bolivia (CTEUB) to negotiate their petition for expanded government resources and a larger budget. Upon the conclusion of talks, CTEUB Executive Secretary Patricio Molina reported that his organization "left the meeting with a taste of almost nothing". As a result, the union announced mobilizations in multiple departments scheduled for 8 March, focused on a march from Senkata to La Paz. On that date, over 2,000 teachers from the thirty-one federations represented by the CTEUB marched through the center of the capital city, demanding compliance with their petition. Subsequent meetings between the CTEUB and the Ministry of Education were unfruitful, with Pary calling the teachers' demands "exaggerated". He pointed out that the Ministry of Education had already signed an agreement with the Rural Magisterium, and classes in that sector were continuing normally.

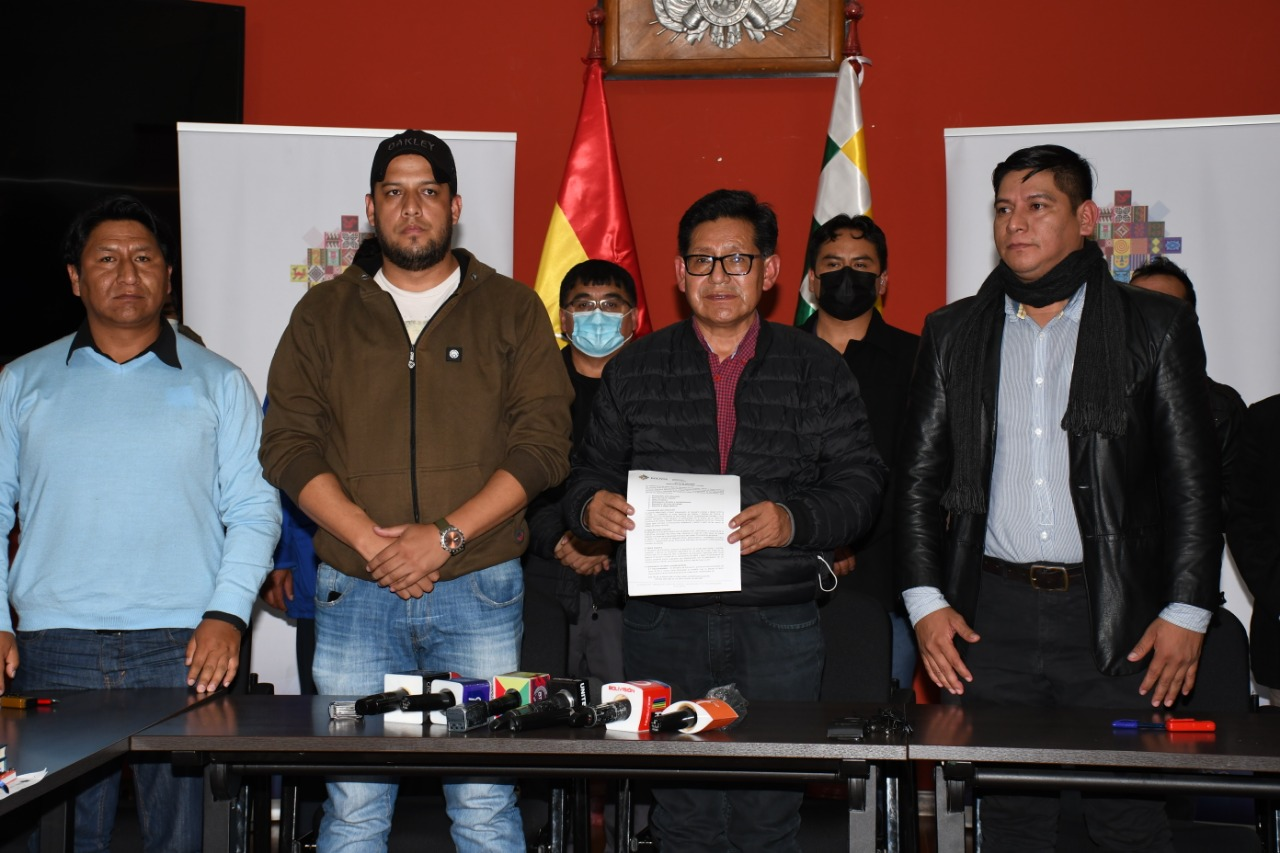
Pary and representatives of the CTEUB sign an agreement to end the teachers' strikes, 18 March 2022.

The second consecutive day of protests was met with conflict between protesters and law enforcement, in which five teachers were wounded and two detained. Pary called on the protesters to "reflect as teachers", stating that "at this time there is violence and violence generates more violence". In the afternoon, negotiations reopened, lasting through the night in the facilities of the American Institute. By 11 March, the lack of an agreement caused the teachers to announce national mobilizations and a 24-hour strike if their demands were not met by the following week. In response, Pary refused to concede, ratifying the Ministry of Education's counterproposal and assuring that compliance with the CTEUB's demands would be "irresponsible [and] unbalance our economy". On 16 March, striking teachers clashed with police in an attempt to force their way into the headquarters of the Ministry of Education. Overnight, they held a vigil outside the building awaiting results from continued negotiations. The following day, the CTEUB announced that, though progress had been made, they had nonetheless rejected Pary's counteroffer. To impose further pressure, they declared nationwide blockades and a paralysis of educational activities until an agreement was reached.

After ten days of mobilizations, on 18 March, Pary announced that the Ministry of Education and the CTEUB had signed an accord to bring an end to the strikes. Among other aspects, it was concluded that the ministry would discuss with parents, students, and social organizations related to education "to generate a budget within the framework of the [government's] economic capacity". Additionally, school districts agreed not to sanction teachers who had participated in the strikes.

Political offices
Preceded by Adrián Quelca	Minister of Education; 2021–present	Incumbent
