= Marisela Escobedo Ortiz =

Murdered Mexican social activist

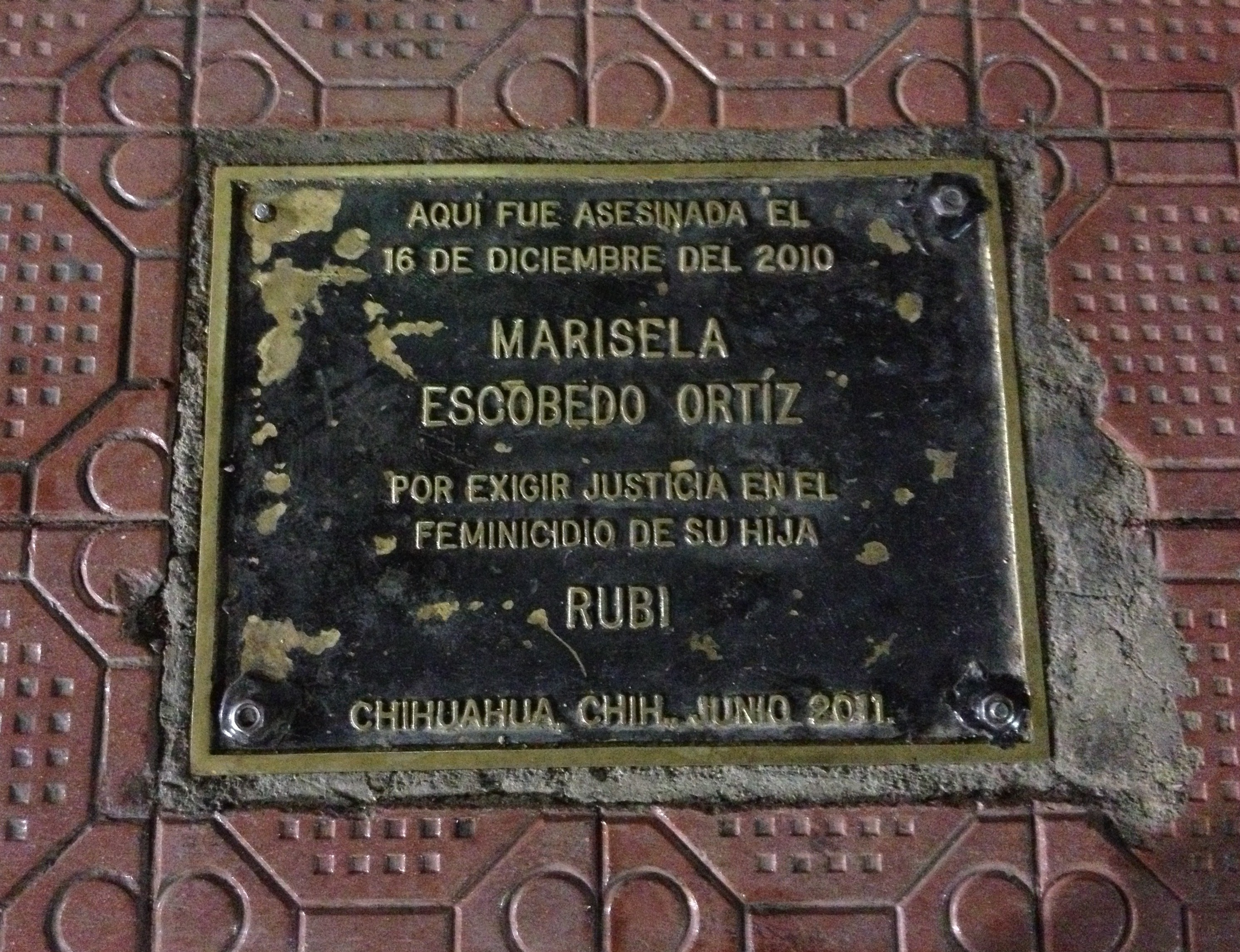
- Plaque indicating the place Escobedo Ortiz was killed
- Born: 12 June 1958; Piedras Negras, Mexico
- Died: 16 December 2010 (aged 52); Chihuahua City, Mexico
- Cause of death: Murder
- Occupations: Nurse, market store owner
- Known for: Social activism
- Children: 5

Marisela Escobedo Ortiz (12 June 1958 – 16 December 2010) was a Mexican social activist from Ciudad Juárez, Chihuahua, who was assassinated while protesting the 2008 femicide of her daughter.

== Background ==
Marisela Escobedo Ortiz's social activism began in 2008 in Ciudad Juárez following the murder of her 16-year-old daughter, Rubí Marisol Frayre Escobedo. Escobedo Ortiz and her husband claimed that Sergio Rafael Barraza Bocanegra murdered their daughter. They managed to locate Barraza Bocanegra in Fresnillo, Zacatecas, where he was arrested and taken to Ciudad Juárez, where he confessed to the crime in court and told of the burial of the remains of Rubí. However, judges acquitted Barraza Bocanegra for lack of evidence, and he was released, thereby generating a scandal that became known nationally and internationally.

Escobedo Ortiz began a series of protests in response to the resolution against Chihuahua state authorities, asking for Barraza Bocanegra to be arrested and tried again, appealing the decision. A circuit court overturned the acquittal, and Barraza Bocanegra was sentenced for murder while he remained a fugitive from justice. After numerous representations to the governors José Reyes Baeza Terrazas and César Duarte Jáquez, they moved their protest to the Plaza Hidalgo in the city of Chihuahua in front of the Government Palace, the home of the governor, where on 16 December 2010, an unknown assassin killed Escobedo Ortiz by a single shot to the head.

Barraza Bocanegra, who was also suspected of ordering Escobedo Ortiz's murder, was killed during a clash with the Mexican military in 2012.

== Timeline of events ==
=== 2008 ===
- August: Escobedo Ortiz's daughter, Rubí Marisol Frayre Escobedo, disappears in Ciudad Juárez.

=== 2009 ===
- June: Escobedo Ortiz locates Sergio Rafael Barraza Bocanegra in Zacatecas. He is detained, confesses to the murder of Rubí, and provides details on her body's location.

=== 2010 ===
- April: Citing a lack of evidence, Barraza Bocanegra is acquitted.
- May: A circuit court overturns the acquittal and sentences Barraza Bocanegra to 50 years in prison for the homicide of Rubí Marisol Frayre Escobedo.
- July: Escobedo Ortiz locates Barraza Bocanegra again in Zacatecas, but he escapes before authorities arrest him. Escobedo Ortiz travels to Mexico City to request an audience with the then president of Mexico, Felipe Calderón, to solicit justice for the murder of her daughter. This request was not granted. Arturo Matus Espino, head of the Citizen Service Office of the Presidency of the Republic, met with Escobedo Ortiz and fellow activist Bertha Alicia García and pledged to continue investigating the deaths of Rubí and García's daughter, Brenda Berenice Castillo, as well as accelerate the investigation of cases of femicide in the country.
- 8 December: Escobedo Ortiz begins a sit-in in front of the Government Palace of Chihuahua to demand the arrest of Barraza Bocanegra.
- 16 December: Escobedo Ortiz is assassinated.

== Cultural references ==
=== In film ===
- The Netflix documentary Las tres muertes de Marisela Escobedo (2020), directed by Carlos Pérez Osorio, is based on her story.

=== In music ===
- Marisela Escobedo Ortiz's name, as well as the name of her daughter, Rubí Marisol Frayre Escobedo, were featured in a version of the song "Canción sin miedo" by Mexican singer/songwriter Vivir Quintana.

=== In theatre ===
- La Ruta by Issac Gómez has a character, Marisela, based on Marisela Escobedo Ortiz.

== See also ==
- Femicides in Ciudad Juárez
- List of unsolved murders (2000–present)
- Mexican drug war
- Susana Chávez
