= Marcelo Navajas =

Bolivian surgeon and pulmonologist

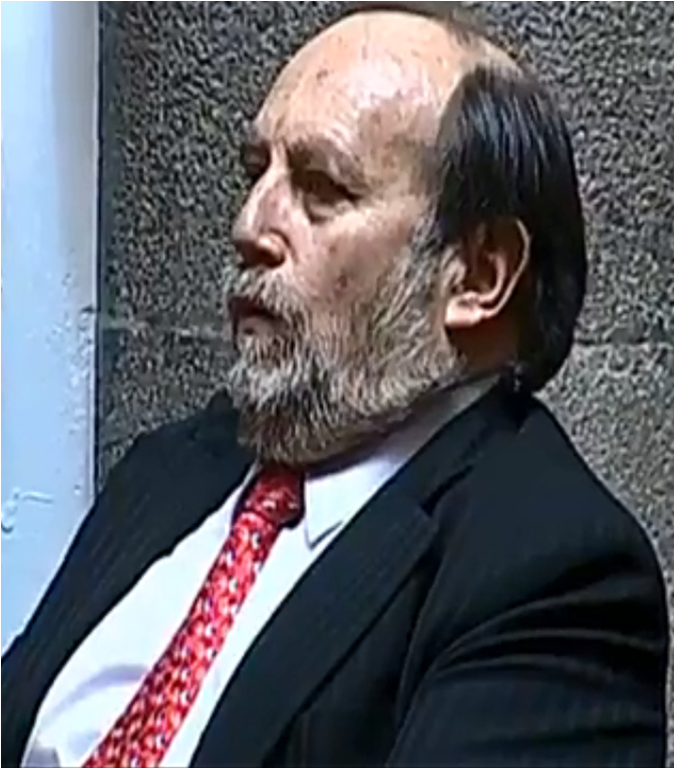
Marcelo Navajas in April 2020

Marcelo Navajas Salinas (born 1 December 1957) is a Bolivian surgeon and pulmonologist. He was the Bolivian Minister of Health from 8 April to 20 May 2020 under the government of interim president Jeanine Áñez. Navajas took over after the resignation minister Aníbal Cruz.
