= Edmundo Novillo =

Bolivian lawyer and politician

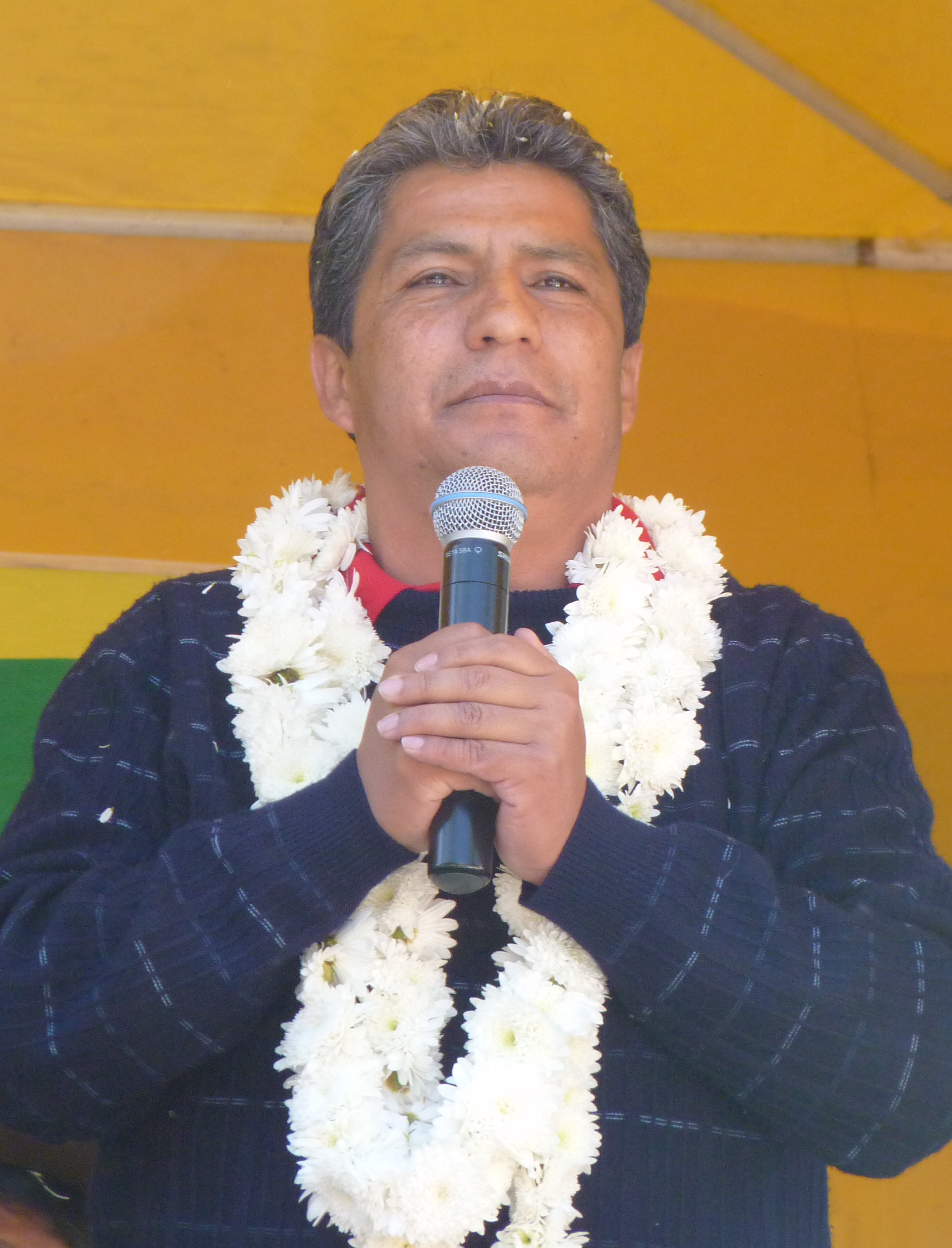
- Novillo in 2011

Minister of Defense
- In office 9 November 2020 – 8 November 2025
- President: Luis Arce
- Preceded by: Luis Fernando López
- Succeeded by: Raúl Salinas

1st Governor of Cochabamba
- In office 30 May 2010 – 31 May 2015
- Preceded by: Jorge Ledezma (as prefect)
- Succeeded by: Iván Canelas

President of the Chamber of Deputies
- In office 22 January 2006 – 22 January 2010
- Preceded by: Norah Soruco
- Succeeded by: Héctor Enrique Arcé Zaconeta

Member of the Chamber of Deputies from Cochabamba
- In office 6 August 2002 – 22 January 2010
- Constituency: Circumscription 29

Personal details
- Born: Edmundo Novillo Aguilar; 28 January 1963 (age 63) Totora, Cochabamba, Bolivia
- Party: Movement for Socialism

Edmundo Novillo Aguilar (born 28 January 1963) is a Bolivian lawyer, politician, and Governor of Cochabamba. His political career includes serving on the Departmental Council, as Mayor of Totora, and as a Deputy in the Bolivian Chamber of Deputies. He was Presidents of the Chamber of Deputies for four years from 2006 to 2010. He is affiliated with the Movement for Socialism (MAS-IPSP), and was the first MAS-IPSP member to serve a President of the Chamber of Deputies.

Novillo won the 2010 gubernatorial election in Cochabamba with 61.9% of the vote. He was succeeded in 2015 by Iván Canelas. On 9 November 2020, the recently inaugurated President Luis Arce appointed him Minister of Defense. It was announced on 28 December that Novillo had gone into quarantine after contracting COVID-19.

Political offices
| Preceded by Norah Soruco | President of the Chamber of Deputies; 2006–2010 | Succeeded by Héctor Enrique Arcé Zaconeta |
| Preceded by Jorge Ledezma as prefect | Governor of Cochabamba; 2010–2015 | Succeeded by Iván Canelas |
| Vacant Title last held by Luis Fernando López | Minister of Defense; 2020–present | Succeeded by Raúl Salinas |
