= The Three Deaths of Marisela Escobedo =

- Netflix release poster
- Directed by: Carlos Perez Osorio
- Starring: Juan Manuel Fraire Escobedo; Alejandro Fraire; Blanca Escobedo
- Production companies: Scopio; Netflix Studios
- Distributed by: Netflix
- Release date: October 14, 2020
- Running time: 109 minutes
- Country: Mexico
- Language: Spanish

The Three Deaths of Marisela Escobedo is a 2020 Mexican documentary film directed by Carlos Perez Osorio about the murder of 16-year-old Mexican Rubí Frayre and the subsequent pursuit of justice by her mother Marisela Escobedo.

== Cast ==
- Juan Manuel Fraire Escobedo - son of Marisela Escobedo
- Alejandro Fraire - son of Marisela Escobedo
- Blanca Escobedo - Marisela Escobedo's sister
- Patricia González - Chihuahua State Attorney
- Ruth Fierro - legal representative of the Escobedo family
- Noel Rodríguez - Public Prosecutor
- Leticia Carreón - friend of Marisela Escobedo
- Arturo Nahle - Zacatecas State Attorney
- Gabino Gómez - legal representative of the Escobedo family
- Lucha Castro - Marisela's lawyer and human rights defender
- Patricia Mayorga - journalist
- Carlos Spector - Escobedo family lawyer
- Perla Márquez - public defender
- César Peniche - current State Attorney of Chihuahua
- Andy Barraza - Sergio Barraza's brother

== See also ==
- List of original films distributed by Netflix
