= Iván Lima =

Bolivian politician

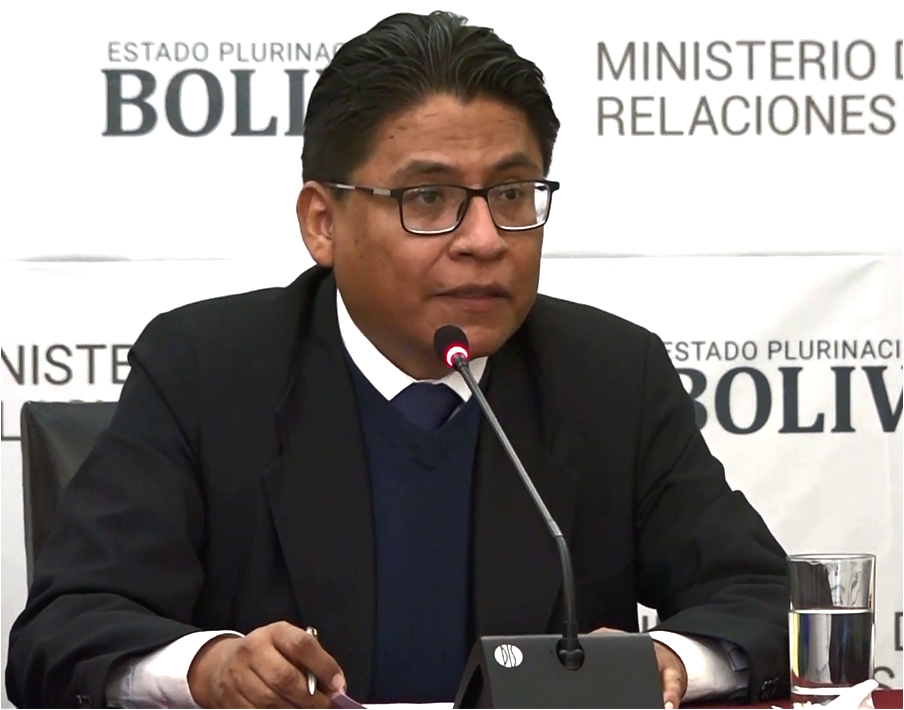

Minister of Justice and Institutional Transparency
- In office 9 November 2020 – 26 September 2024
- President: Luis Arce
- Preceded by: Álvaro Coimbra Cornejo
- Succeeded by: César Siles

Magistrate of the Supreme Tribunal of Justice of Bolivia
- In office 28 April 2014 – 3 January 2016
- Preceded by: William Alave Laura

Personal details
- Born: Iván Manolo Lima Magne; 21 March 1974 (age 51) La Paz, Bolivia
- Political party: MAS-IPSP
- Education: Bolivian Catholic University

Iván Manolo Lima Magne (born 21 March 1974) is a Bolivian lawyer, professor, and politician. He served as the Minister of Justice and Institutional Transparency, from 9 November 2020 until his resignation on September 26, 2024, during the government of Luis Arce. He previously served as a Magistrate of the Supreme Tribunal of Justice from 2014 to 2016, having been elected to succeed William Alave Laura.

Political offices
Preceded by Álvaro Coimbra Cornejo	Minister of Justice and Institutional Transparency; 2020-present	Succeeded by Incumbent
