= Ministry of Justice (Bolivia) =

Government ministry of Bolivia

The Ministry of Justice and Institutional Transparency of Bolivia (Spanish: Ministerio de Justicia y Transparencia Institucional) was, prior to its closure, in charge of certain justice sectors within Bolivia. The ministry included the following vice-ministries:

- Justice and Fundamental Rights
- Indigenous Peasant Native Justice
- Equal Opportunities
- Defense of User and Consumer Rights
- Institutional Transparency and Fight against Corruption

The ministry has gone by several names. For instance, in 2017, the Ministry of Institutional Transparency and Fight Against Corruption and the Ministry of Justice were merged by Supreme Decree 3058—thereby becoming the Ministry of Justice and Institutional Transparency.

Following the election of Rodrigo Paz Pereira as President in the 2025 Bolivian general election, the Ministry was dissolved. Rodrigo Paz had campaigned on dismantling the Ministry, claiming it to be a tool of political persecution by the MAS government.

== List of ministers ==
This list is incomplete, as it only shows the ministers who served post-1966.

=== Minister of Government, Justice & Immigration / Minister of Interior, Migration & Justice / Minister of Interior / Minister of Interior, Immigration & Justice ===
- Antonio Arguedas Mendieta (1966–1968)
- Eufronio Padillacaere (1969)
- Juan Ayoroa (1970)
- Jorge Gallardo Lozada (1970–1971)
- Mario Adet Zamora Claros (1972–1973)
- Walter Castro Avendano (1974)
- Juan Asbun Pereda (1975–1977)
- Guillermo Jimenez Gallo (1978)
- Raul Leyton Lopez (1979)
- Jorge Selum Vaca Diez (1980)
- Luis Arce Gomez (1981)

=== Minister of Interior, Migration & Justice ===
- Romulo Mercado Garnica (1982)
- Mario Roncal Antezana (1983)
- Federico Alvarez Plata (1984–1985)
- Fernando Barthelemy Martinez (1986–1987)
- Juan Carlos Duran Saucedo (1987–1989)
- Guillermo Capobianco Rivera (1990)
- Carlos Saavedra Bruno (1991–1993)
- Carlos Morales Guillen (1993–1994)

=== Minister of Justice / Minister of Justice & Human Rights ===
- Rene Blattman Bauer (1995–1996)
- Raul Espana Smith (1997)
- Ana Maria Cortez de Soriano (1997–1999) [1st female]
- Carlos Alberto Subirana (2000)
- Juan Antonio Chahin Lupo (2000)
- Luis Angel Vasquez Villamor (2001)
- Mario Luis Serrate Ruiz (2002)
- Gina Luz Mendez Hurtado (2002–2003)
- Casimira Rodríguez (2006–2007)
- Celima Torrico Rojas (2007–2010)
- Nilda Copa (2010–2012)
- Sandra Elizabeth Gutierrez Salazar (2013–2014)
- Virginia Velasco Condori (2015–2017)
- Héctor Enrique Arce Zaconeta (2017–?)

=== Minister of Justice and Institutional Transparency ===
- Héctor Arce (2017–2019)
- Álvaro Eduardo Coimbra Cornejo (2019-2020)
- Iván Lima (2020-2024)
- César Siles (2024–present)

== See also ==
- Justice ministry
- Politics of Bolivia
