= Bolivian Catholic University San Pablo =

Catholic University of Bolivia
- Universidad Católica Boliviana "San Pablo"
- Established: 1963; 62 years ago, May 14, 1966; 59 years ago as Instituto Superior de Economía y Empresa)
- Rector: Marco Antonio Fernández Calderón
- Location: La Paz, Bolivia; 16.5227°S 68.1118°W
- Campus: La Paz; Cochabamba; Santa Cruz; Tarija
- Website: www.ucb.edu.bo

University rankings

Global – Overall
- QS World: 1001+ (2021)

Regional – Overall
- QS Latin America: 251-300 (2021)

Universidad Católica Boliviana "San Pablo" is the official name of the Catholic University of Bolivia. This private university is the oldest in Bolivia that does not receive economical budget of Government. Established in La Paz in 1963 and active since 1966, the university now has four regional units in La Paz, Cochabamba, Tarija and Santa Cruz de la Sierra.

== Notable alumni ==
- Rosmery Mollo – reproductive health activist.
- Vero Pérez – musician and songwriter
