= Última Hora =

Última Hora (Spanish for "Last Hour") may refer to several newspapers:

- Última Hora (Bolivia), 1929–2001
- Última Hora (Brazil), 1951–1971
- Última Hora (Nuevo Laredo), Tamaulipas, Mexico, founded in 1996
- Última Hora (Paraguay), founded in 1973
- Última Hora (Spain), in the Balearic Islands, founded in 1893
- Última Hora (Venezuela), a newspaper in Venezuela
