= Raúl Peñaranda =

Bolivian journalist and political analyst

Raúl Peñaranda Undurraga (born 1966) is a Bolivian journalist and political analyst.

== Career ==
In 2015 Peñaranda obtained the Maria Moors Cabot for outstanding reporting in Latin America prize, granted by Columbia University. The jury said that he "is one of the most accomplished journalists in Bolivia today" and that "his strong stance against abuse of power and media concentration by the Morales regime, particularly in his latest book "Control Remoto," earned him relentless persecution by the government, which called him a traitor and a spy.

He was the first Bolivian to obtain a Nieman Fellowship at Harvard University in 2007. As a fellow, he studied two academic semesters focusing on topics related to development, democracy and political conflict.

Peñaranda is a former Associated Press and ANSA correspondent in his country and has also worked as a freelance contributor for the Los Angeles Times and a number of Latin American newspapers. Since August 2008, he has written for El Universo, the biggest Ecuadorean daily, and published a column for La Prensa, a Bolivian newspaper. He has worked at several Bolivian dailies: He was managing editor of Última Hora, opinion editor and columnist of La Razón and director and founder of three local newspapers: La Época, Nueva Economía and Página Siete.

He has published several books related to journalism and politics. He holds a degree in social communication (Universidad Católica Boliviana) and is a graduate in advanced journalism (Universidad Andina Simón Bolívar).

In 2011, as editor of Página Siete daily, Peñaranda planned and supervised the award-winning series "Viaje al Corazón de Bolivia" ("Journey to the Heart of Bolivia"), a collection of 25 stories produced by three reporters and three photographers during a six-month, cross-country trip that provided a complex portrait of modern-day Bolivia. Because of this, in December 2012, Peñaranda won the "UNCA's Elizabeth Neuffer Prize", awarded by Ban Ki-moon in New York.

Earlier in 2012, the Bolivian government pressed criminal charges against Página Siete and two other Bolivian media outlets for reporting on controversial comments made by Bolivian president Evo Morales. The news outlets were accused of inciting racism and discrimination.

Peñaranda told the committee to Protect Journalists that Página Siete had accurately reported on Morales's remarks saying, "This is a lawsuit that makes no sense, and is only designed to intimidate independent media and limit freedom of expression in the country." He added that media offenses were supposed to be tried under the country's rarely used press law, which is part of the country's civil code. The charges were eventually removed and Peñaranda kept doing his job.

However, on August 22, 2013, due to repetitive controversial government attacks and offenses towards the newspaper (that Peñaranda said to be "low, coward and vile"), Peñaranda made the decision to quit his job as managing editor. Among other things, he was accused of being unpatriotic over an international dispute, since his mother was born in Chile.

The former editor of Página Siete lead during 2014 a subregional network that defends freedom of expression, called GALI(Grupo Andino de Libertades Informativas). This association of organizations has entities in Peru, Bolivia, Ecuador and Venezuela. He works now for ANF, a Bolivian news agency, and edits an international supplement for Página Siete.

== Life ==
He is married to Bolivian social communicator Fatima Molina and has two children: Diego and Juan José Peñaranda.
