= Teresa Gisbert =

Bolivian architect and art historian

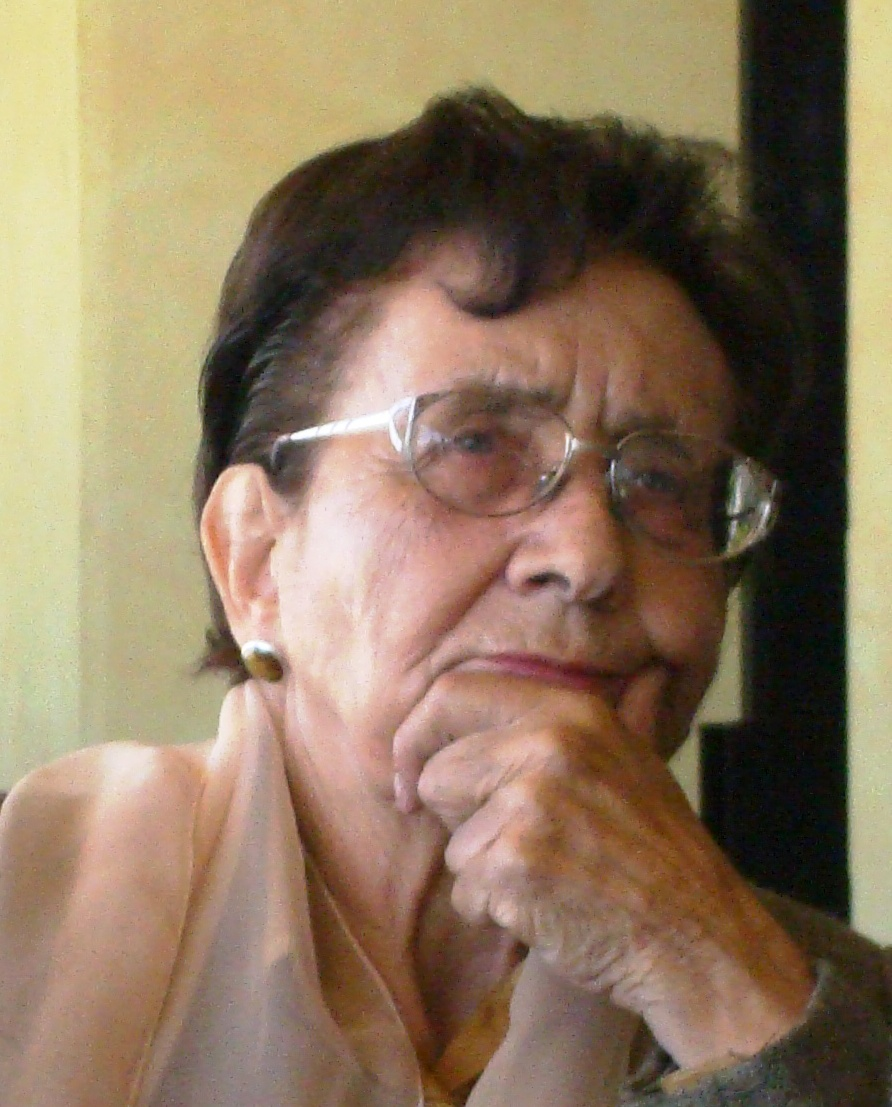
- Teresa Gisbert, 2007
- Born: Teresa Gisbert Carbonell; 30 November 1926; La Paz, Bolivia
- Died: 19 February 2018 (aged 91)
- Occupations: Architect, art historian
- Spouse: José de Mesa
- Children: 4, including Carlos

Teresa Gisbert Carbonell de Mesa (30 November 1926 – 19 February 2018) was a Bolivian architect and art historian. She specialized in the history of the Andean region.

== Biography ==
Teresa Gisbert Carbonell was born on 30 November 1926 in La Paz, Bolivia. Her family emigrated from Spain. She earned a bachelor's degree in arquitecture and urbanism in the Higher University of San Andrés (La Paz) in 1950. After finishing her studies, Teresa Gisbert travelled to Spain, along with her husband José de Mesa, whom she had married in 1950, to complete her graduate studies in art history. De Mesa and Gisbert had four children: Carlos, Andrés, Isabel and Teresa Guiomar.

During her staying in Spain, between 1953 and 1962, she served as a researcher at the Laboratory of Art of the University of Seville and at the Diego Velasquez Art Institute.

From 1954 to 1970, she taught Bolivian culture and art history in the Faculty of Humanities at the Higher University of San Andrés and in 1972 and 1975 she taught American Art in the Faculty of Architecture of this same institution.

Gisbert was the director of the National Art Museum in La Paz from 1970 to 1976. She was president of the Bolivian Society for History from 1983 to 1984. She directed the Bolivian Cultural Institute from 1985 to 1989 and was president of the International Council on Monuments and Sites in Bolivia from 1986 to 1992.

Gisbert has received numerous awards and scholarships for her research in art, arquitecture and history. These include a Guggenheim Fellowship in 1958 and 1966 to conduct research on colonial art. and a visiting scholarship at Getty Research Institute for the History of Art and the Humanities from 1990 to 1991 and from 1993 to 1994. She was elected to the American Philosophical Society in 2006.

== Selected works ==
With José de Mesa

- Historia de la pintura Cuzqueña (History of Painting in Cuzco, 1962)
- Holguín y la pintura virreinal en Bolivia (Holguín and Viceregal Bolivian Painting, 1977)
- Historia del Arte en Bolivia (2012)

With S. Arze and M. Cajías

- Arte textil y mundo Andino (Textile Art and the Andean World, 1987)

Independent works

- Literatura virreinal en Bolivia (1968)
- Iconografía y mitos indígenas en el arte (Indigenous Iconography and Myths in Art, 1980)
- Manual de historia de Bolivia (Handbook of Bolivian History, 1994)
- El Paraíso de los Pájaros Parlantes. La imagen del otro en la cultura andina (1999)
- Arte, Poder e Identidad (2016)
