= Correo del Sur =

Bolivian daily newspaper

Correo del Sur is a daily newspaper published in Sucre, Bolivia. The paper serves for the departments of Chuquisaca, Potosí, and Tarija.
