= Arturo von Vacano =

Bolivian novelist and journalist (1938–2019)

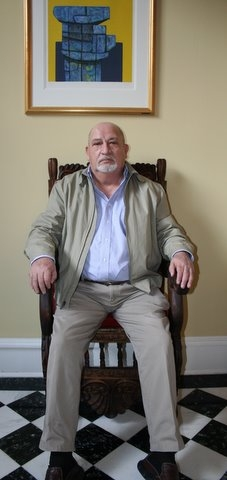
- Arturo von Vacano, Washington DC 2010
- Born: 1938; La Paz, Bolivia
- Died: December 26, 2019 (aged 80–81); Alexandria, Virginia, U.S.
- Occupations: Novelist, journalist
- Years active: 1970s–2010s
- Notable work: Morder El Silencio (1983), Sombra de Exilio
- Spouse: Marcela
- Children: Marcela E., Diego, Claudia

Arturo von Vacano (born 1938, La Paz, Bolivia) was a Bolivian novelist and journalist. He wrote fiction in the 1970s and 1980s during periods of military dictatorship. He died in the Washington, D.C., area in December 2019, a month before his eighty-second birthday.

== Early life ==
Von Vacano began his studies at San Andrés University in La Paz. Afterwards, he began his career as a journalist in Lima, Peru in 1960. He came to the U.S. as a fellow of the World Press Association in 1966. Vacano wrote a popular daily newspaper column until 1980; he later worked in advertising, public relations, and magazine publishing before fleeing Bolivia in 1980. He fled in 1980 during the García Meza dictatorship, settling first in New York City and later in the Washington, D.C., area.

== Later life ==
After 1980, von Vacano was a writer, editor, and translator for United Press International in New York and Washington, D.C. He published several works, including Sombra de Exilio and Morder El Silencio. "Morder El Silencio" was published in 1983 in New York City by Avon Books in English as "Biting Silence," and was considered one of the major books of the Latin American "Boom" in political fiction of the 1980s. He continued to write fiction as well as political and social commentary on world politics as well as the politics of Bolivia, especially during the Evo Morales period. His most significant works have appeared or were re-published since 2000.

Arturo von Vacano died on December 26, 2019, in Alexandria, Virginia at 82. He is survived by his wife Marcela, and children Marcela E., Diego, and Claudia.

== List of works ==
- Sombra de Exilio (1970)
- El Apocalipsis de Antón (1972)
- Morder el Silencio - published in English as Biting Silence, by Avon Books (1987) and Ruminator Books (2003)
- Los Laberintos de la Libertad (1995)
- Memoria del Vacío (2004 Comteco)
- Hombre Masa (2004 Latinas Editores) ISBN 978-99905-78-28-7.
