= Última Hora (Spain) =

- Type: Daily newspaper
- Founder: Josep Tous Ferrer
- Editor: Hora Nova S.A.
- Headquarters: Palma
- Circulation: 15,000 (2024)
- ISSN: 1578-6307
- OCLC number: 436611389
- Website: ultimahora.es

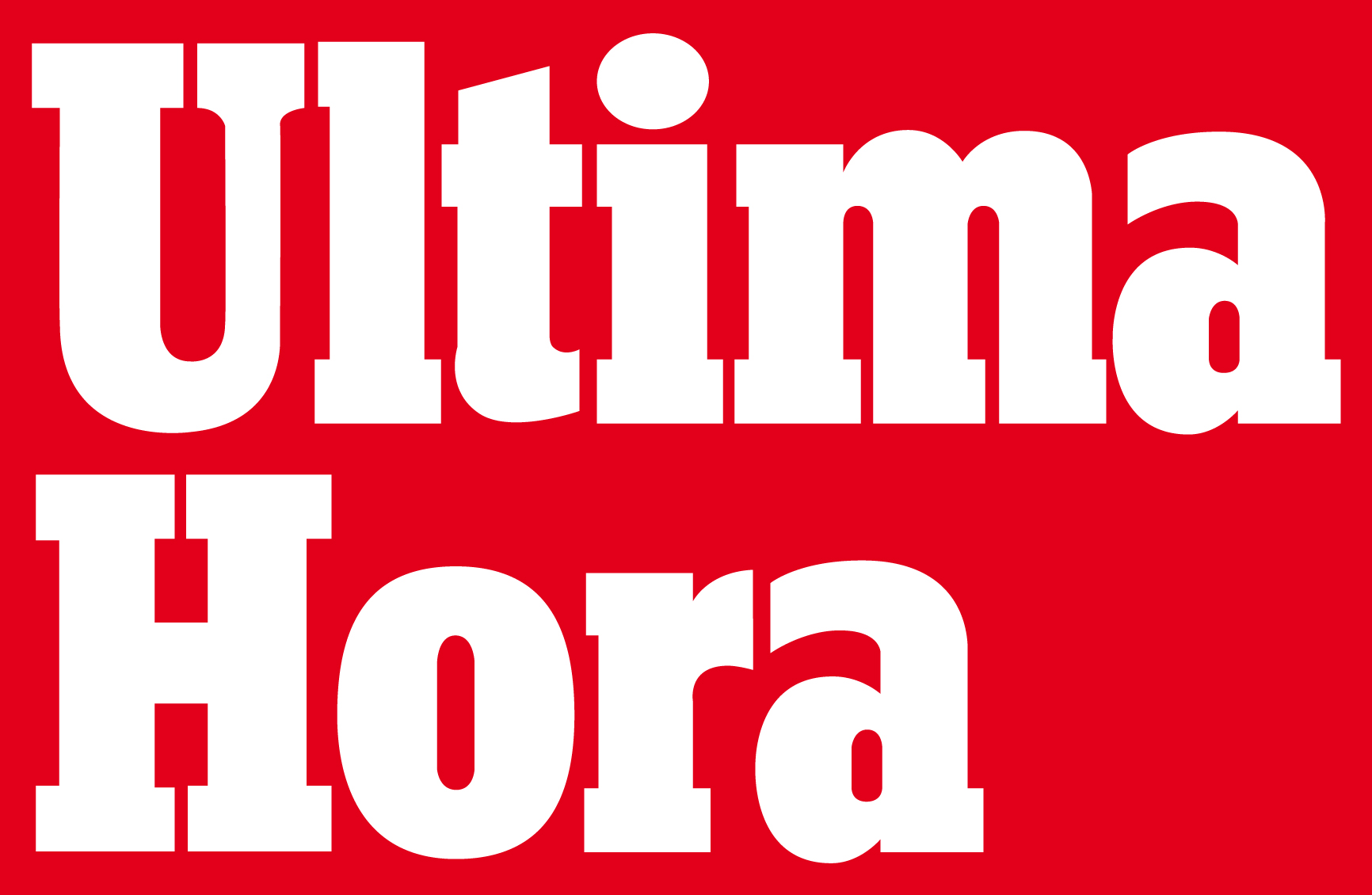

Última Hora is the best selling newspaper in the Balearic Islands founded by Josep Tous Ferrer on 1 May 1893, published by Hora Nova S.A. and belong to Grupo Serra, a mass communication company. The publication is dedicated to local news and has been distinguished with the Gold Medal of the City of Palma from the Confederación de Asociaciones Empresariales de las Baleares (CAEB).

== Directors ==
- Josep Tous Ferrer (1893–1950)
- Josep Tous Lladó (1950–1958)
- Ferran Tous Lladó (1958–1960)
- Josep Tous Barberán (1960–1974)
- Pere Antoni Serra Bauzà (1974–1983)
- Pere Comas Barceló (1984–2014)
- Miquel Serra Magraner (desde 2014)

== Ideology ==
Última Hora is a newspaper with a liberal tradition. During World War I, they took an editorial position in favor of the Anglophile countries. Their first era of publication was characterized by the support to the policy of Valerià Weyler and of the Liberal Weylerista Party.

During the Dictatorship of Primo de Rivera, the newspaper was censored and its sections most affected included reports on telegraph service, editorials and opinion pieces.

During the Second Republic, they took a more conservative editorial line and were critical of media with connections to the working class. In spite of this, in its pages published socialist leaders articles like Alexandre Jaume and Gabriel Alomar i Villalonga, and celebrated the proclamation of the new regime.

During the Dictatorship, the newspaper was subject to prior censorship and, in the late 1960s, accentuated its liberal tendency and position in favor of democracy. From 1974 until today, Última Hora has been characterized as a newspaper with a liberal autonomist tendency.

== Editors and contributors ==
- Joan Lluís Estelrich
- Pere d'Alcàntara Peña
- Miguel Sarmiento
- Alexandre Jaume
- Gabriel Alomar
- Pau Llull
- Antoni Serra
- Francesc de B. Moll
- Josep M. Llompart
- Gabriel Janer Manila
- Blai Bonet
- Damià Pons
- Guillem Frontera
- Josep Melià
- Maria de la Pau Janer
- Llorenç Capellà
- Baltasar Porcel
- Joan Francesc López Casasnoves

== Digital edition ==
In 1997, Grupo Serra decided to create a digital edition. A year later, they launched ultimahora.es . They served as a national pioneer in Spain for online editions of newspapers. In 2010, their online version had a major redesign and their contents were modified.

== Bibliography ==
- Gran enciclopedia de Mallorca (in Spanish). Inca: Promomallorca. 1989. ISBN 8486617022. OCLC 47973553.
- Gran enciclopèdia catalana (in Catalan) (2 ed.). Barcelona: Encilopèdia Catalana. 1986. ISBN 8485194810. OCLC 434836269.
- Cataleg de 100 anys de premsa diària de les Balears (in Catalan). Palma: Grupo Serra. 1993. OCLC 434836269.
