= Página Siete =

Bolivian daily newspaper

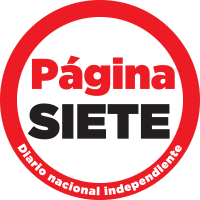

- First edition front page, 24 April 2010
- Type: Daily newspaper
- Format: Tabloid
- Founder(s): Raúl Garáfulic; Raúl Peñaranda
- Publisher: Compañía Editora Luna Llena S.A.
- President: Mary Vaca Villa
- Founded: 24 April 2010
- Ceased publication: June 29, 2023
- Language: Spanish
- Headquarters: La Paz, Bolivia
- City: La Paz
- Country: Bolivia
- Website: www.paginasiete.bo

Página Siete was a daily newspaper published in La Paz, Bolivia. It was founded on 24 April 2010. Página Siete focused on politics and economics, but it also had social and culture sections. The government of Evo Morales made several complaints against Página Siete, leading to accusations of censorship of the press.

In 2013, the then director, Raúl Peñaranda, resigned, citing the continuing attacks from the government, stating "The Government is resuming a cowardly attack on Página Siete, a low attack, a vile attack on us because we are an independent newspaper".

After years of financial constraints and a block imposed by the ruling party preventing private companies from advertising, Página Siete published its final edition on 29 June 2023.
