= Última Hora (Bolivia) =

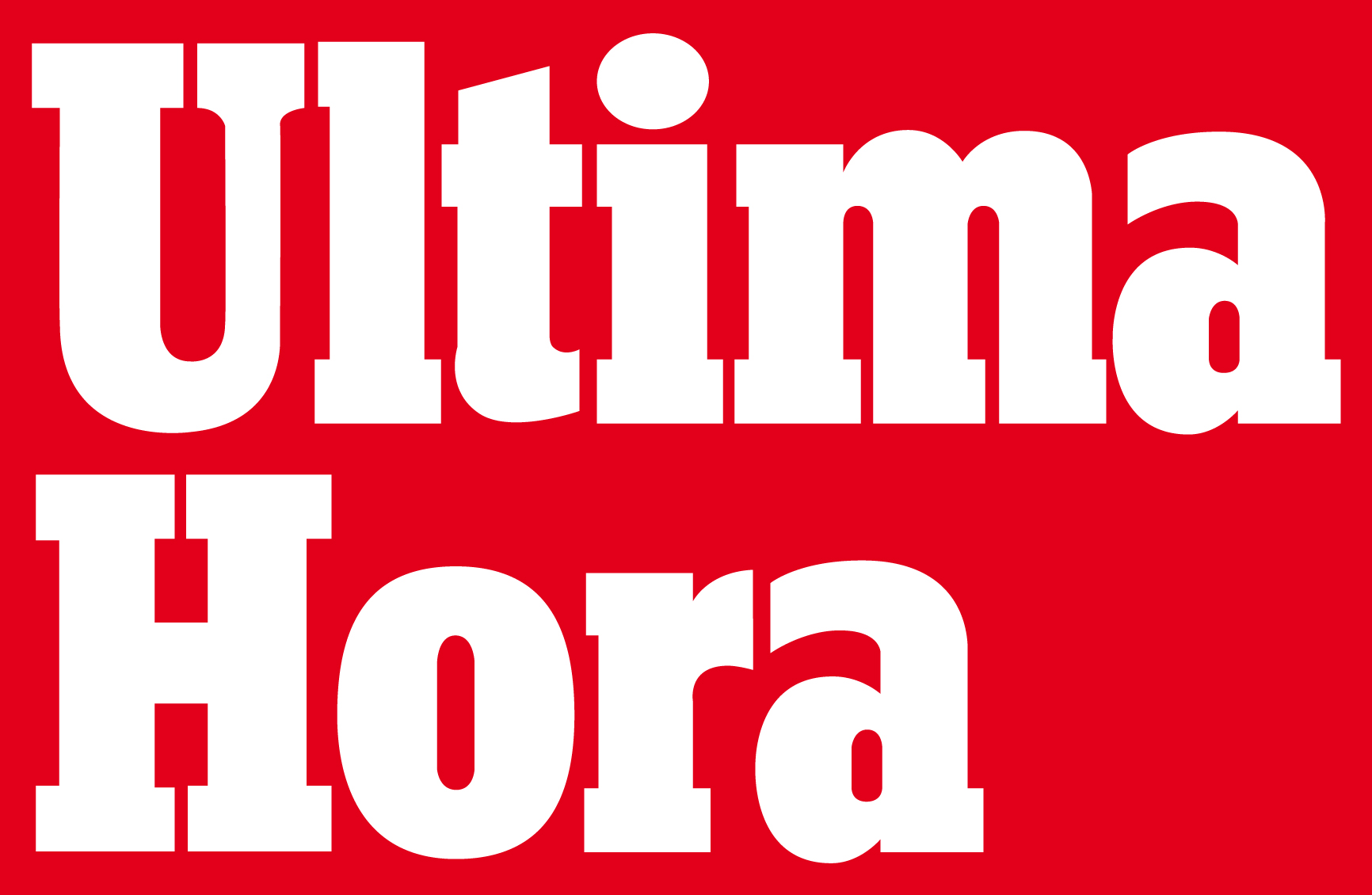
Ultima hora logo

Última Hora was a newspaper published in Bolivia. The newspaper began publication on 30 April 1929 and ceased publication in 2001.
