= Iván Arias =

Bolivian politician (born 1958)

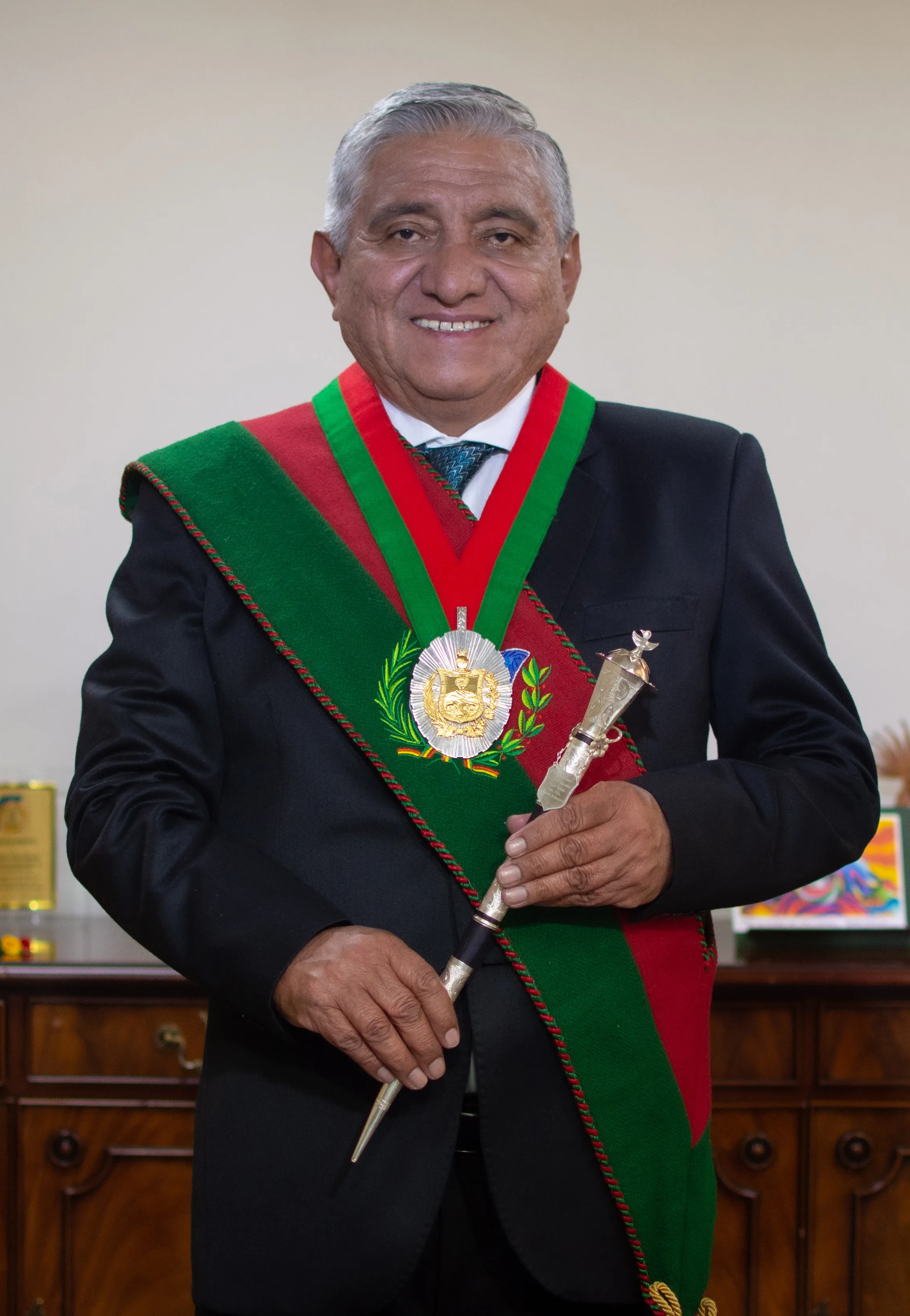
- Official portrait, 2021

Mayor of La Paz
- In office 3 May 2021 – 4 May 2026
- Preceded by: Luis Revilla
- Succeeded by: César Dockweiler

Minister of Public Works, Services, and Housing
- In office 3 December 2019 – 6 November 2020
- President: Jeanine Áñez
- Preceded by: Yerko Núñez
- Succeeded by: Edgar Montaño

Vice Minister of Strategic Planning and Popular Participation
- In office 14 August 2001 – 1 April 2002
- President: Jorge Quiroga
- Minister: Ramiro Cavero
- Preceded by: Mario Galindo
- Succeeded by: Marianela Zeballos

Personal details
- Born: Hernán Iván Padilla Durán; 8 August 1958 (age 68) La Paz, Bolivia
- Party: For the Common Good (2020–present)
- Other political affiliations: Workers' Vanguard (1978–1981); Nationalist Democratic Action (2002)
- Education: Juan XXIII Boarding School
- Alma mater: {{ubl|Higher University of San Andrés
- Occupation: Political analyst; politician; sociologist

Hernán Iván Arias Durán (né Padilla; born 8 August 1958), often referred to as El Negro, is a Bolivian politician, political analyst, and sociologist serving as mayor of La Paz since 2021. A member of For the Common Good, of which he is the leader, he previously served as minister of public works from 2019 to 2020 and vice minister of popular participation from 2001 to 2002. A specialist in decentralized public management and indigenous matters, he was the private secretary of Víctor Hugo Cárdenas, the first indigenous vice president, and was part of the team that drafted the Law of Popular Participation, which implemented municipalism in Bolivia through the direct election of local authorities.

Born in La Paz and raised in rural poverty, Arias attended the Juan XXIII Boarding School in Cochabamba, where he was educated in Marxist thought by trade unionist Filemón Escóbar. He graduated as a sociologist from the Higher University of San Andrés. During the military governments of the late 1970s and early 1980s, Arias became a partisan of Escóbar's Workers' Vanguard. For his Marxist activism, he was imprisoned and tortured by the Luis García Meza regime, later fleeing to exile in Sweden, where he abandoned most of his subversive beliefs. Returning to Bolivia, Arias worked for the Peasant Research and Promotion Center and was a member of the Technical Support Team for Educational Reform, later serving as the private secretary of Vice President Víctor Hugo Cárdenas. In the early 1990s, Arias assisted in drafting the Law of Popular Participation, which expanded municipal autonomy and granted the populace suffrage over their local governments. During the administration of Jorge Quiroga, he served as vice minister of popular participation, resigning the post to seek a seat in the Chamber of Deputies, though he failed to attain it.

In the ensuing two decades, Arias reinvented himself as a consultant and political analyst. His unique and humorous style of conveying information gained him widespread notoriety. In 2019, he returned to political life after a seventeen-year hiatus, serving as minister of public works in the transitional administration of Jeanine Áñez. Upon the conclusion of his term, he launched his bid for the La Paz mayoralty. Arias' innovative campaign, described as populist by some observers, won him the election. As mayor, Arias launched public works projects aimed at renovating the capital's infrastructure. Despite attempting to present himself as an apolitical figure interested in "reconciliation" between opposing groups, Arias nonetheless faced numerous legal processes instigated by the ruling Movement for Socialism, actions he denounced as acts of political persecution.

== Early life and education ==
Arias was born Hernán Iván Padilla Durán on 8 August 1958 in La Paz. He is the son of Julia Durán Severiche, a peasant woman who emigrated to the capital from her native Vallegrande in search of greater economic opportunity. Arias' baptismal name is an homage to Hernán Siles Zuazo, the sitting president at the time of his birth, while the name Iván comes from Iver, an elder sibling who died in childhood. His biological father, Isidro Padilla, abandoned the family shortly after his birth, with his stepfather, Manuel Arias Becerra, being his primary paternal figure throughout his childhood. Iván retained the surname Padilla until shortly before entering high school, at which point he permanently adopted his stepfather's surname.

Arias and his six siblings were raised in El Alto—at the time a remote satellite city of La Paz—in a state of rural poverty. From a young age, Arias' mother instilled in him the maxim of "poor but worthy", teaching him and his siblings to wash, iron, and mend their own clothing so as to appear presentable in public. "It annoyed her that we raised compassion [among others]", Arias stated, "[she told us that] if you seek compassion, they will give it to you, but they will use you and then despise you". Durán also strongly discouraged her children from stealing, "even if you're starving". "The thief starts ... at home", she stated. In one instance, Arias recalled receiving "the beating of my life" for having picked up a b$5 bill off the street. Throughout his adolescence, Arias made an income working as a shoeshiner and selling lottery tickets.

In the early 1970s, Arias' stepfather, a teacher at the Fe y Alegría schools, nominated him to attend the newly inaugurated Juan XXIII Boarding School in Cochabamba. He was informed of the opportunity while on a work trip to Vallegrande, giving him just fifteen days to return to La Paz and study for the entrance exam. During his time at the Jesuit institution, Arias became an adherent of liberation theology, a sect of Christian theology conversant with Marxian socioeconomic analyses. He was educated in the field of history by Filemón Escóbar, a prominent trade unionist whom the Jesuits had been sheltering under the assumed name of Lucho Rodríguez. "We thought he was just another academic", Arias stated. With Escóbar as his political mentor, Arias came to embrace Marxist thought, including elements of Guevarist "new man" theory. He carried these ideals to the Higher University of San Andrés, where he studied sociology, additionally becoming self-taught in the fields of economics, local development, and public law. Moreover, he studied journalism at the Bolivian Catholic University.

In the late 1970s, Arias reluctantly enlisted into the Armed Forces to complete his mandatory year of military service. He served in the Military Police (PM) of San Jorge, La Paz, where he was trained as a sniper, rising to the rank of corporal. His nom de guerre was búho (owl), owing to his slim figure with comparatively large "eyes and balls". Arias' service in the PM coincided with a period of political instability in Bolivia, during which time longtime dictator Hugo Banzer was ousted in favor of Juan Pereda. Among the PM, Pereda's assumption was viewed as a betrayal, and it was soon decided to remove him from office. In the early hours of 24 November 1978, Arias was placed under the command of General Raúl López Leytón, who put him in charge of a military contingent tasked with guarding the Irpavi neighborhood, which housed the presidential residence. Following Pereda's removal, López Leytón entrusted Arias with escorting General David Padilla from the Army General Staff to the Palacio Quemado to assume the presidency.

== Political and journalistic career ==
Arias entered political life as a member of the Workers' Vanguard (VO), a minor organization founded by Escóbar following his split with the larger Revolutionary Workers' Party (POR). Arias' Marxist activism put him at odds with the military governments of the day. In 1981, he was imprisoned and tortured by the Luis García Meza regime, nearly suffering permanent paralysis on his left side after sustaining two gunshot wounds during a botched escape attempt. Following his release, Arias fled to exile in Sweden under the assumed name of Jhonny Domínguez Mamani. He arrived in Stockholm, where he underwent the necessary surgeries to retain his mobility before settling in Malmö. While abroad, Arias abandoned many of his more subversive left-wing values in favor of moderate democratic socialist principles.

Returning to Bolivia, Arias became an early supporter of the nascent indigenist movement, leading the press team that covered the March for Territory and Dignity, in which over 300 lowland indigenous protesters traveled from Trinidad to La Paz demanding State recognition and respect of tribal lands. He went on to work for the Peasant Research and Promotion Center (CIPCA) before being invited by Amalia Anaya to join the Technical Support Team for Educational Reform (ETARE), which sought to improve the country's education system. During this time, Arias became closely acquainted with Víctor Hugo Cárdenas, an educator and ETARE consultant at the time campaigning to become vice president. Upon assuming office, Cárdenas—the country's first Aymara indigenous vice president—appointed Arias as his private secretary.

While working in the Vice President's Office, Arias became involved in the early stages of formulating the Law of Popular Participation, which intended to implement a municipalist system across the country. Originally at the sidelines of the project, Arias became more deeply involved upon joining the National Secretariat for Popular Participation, serving on the team of the project's lead, Carlos Hugo Molina, as part of the research and analysis unit. Promulgated on 20 April 1994 by President Gonzalo Sánchez de Lozada, Law Nº 1551 of Popular Participation deeply decentralized the country, allowing for civic engagement in local public administration by expanding the autonomous power of municipalities.

=== Vice Minister of Popular Participation ===
In 2001, during the administration of Jorge Quiroga, Arias was appointed to serve as head of the Vice Ministry of Strategic Planning and Popular Participation. One of the first projects of Arias' administration was the "National Crusade against Poverty", which focused on working with prefectures and municipal governments to determine what resources they could expect to receive from the government. In particular, the ministry was able to provide on-demand technical assistance to municipal governments by establishing local operating groups (GOLs), teams of technicians directly contracted by municipalities using State finance. "The idea was ... to bring the State closer to the people; that technical assistance is not given from La Paz, but that the technicians are there, within the municipality", Arias stated. In collaboration with the executive committee of the Bolivian University (CEUB), the Ministry of Education, and the Ministry of Sustainable Development, Arias implemented the "Youth against Poverty" program. The project trained and sent university students to work as civil servants in various municipalities for a six-month period. According to Arias, of the 314 students sponsored by the program, thirty percent maintained careers in civil service upon graduating.

Leading up to the 2002 general elections, Arias resigned to stand for a seat in the Chamber of Deputies as part of Nationalist Democratic Action's electoral list. From the legislature, he hoped to expand on his previous work decentralizing municipalities by applying the same principle to prefectures with the aim of attaining departmental autonomy. Arias lost the election, later expressing regret for having ever stood for office, describing it as an act of hubris that "disqualified" any good intention he may have had. The electoral loss halted Arias' political career for over a decade.

=== Journalist and political analyst ===
Between the mid-2000s and the late-2010s, Arias reinvented himself as a political analyst and consultant. He worked for a variety of municipal governments, including multiple departmental capitals, advising them on matters of education, health, and urban development. As an international consultant, Arias worked for companies based in Ecuador, El Salvador, and Sweden, as well as for the United States Agency for International Development (USAID). In journalism, Arias served as a writer for multiple news outlets, later making the jump to television as a political analyst for the program El Abogado del Diablo on UNITEL. Arias' unique style of explaining and exemplifying political issues through the use of dolls and drawings gained him widespread notoriety. As did his critiques of the Evo Morales administration, of which he was a vocal opponent from its assumption in 2005, classifying it as "authoritarian".

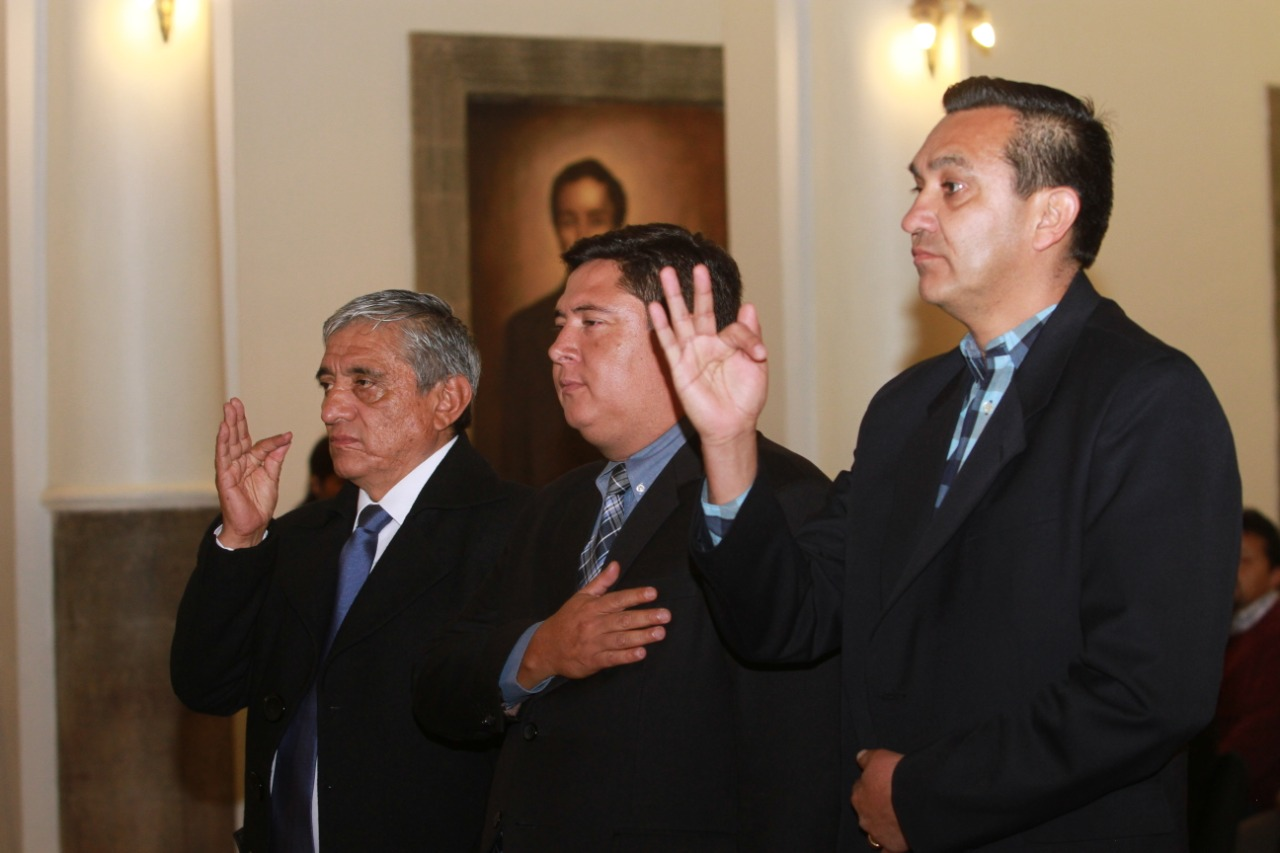
Arias (left) is sworn in as minister of public works, 3 December 2019.

=== Minister of Public Works ===
On 3 December 2019, after an over seventeen-year political hiatus, Arias returned to government, appointed minister of public works in the caretaker cabinet of President Jeanine Áñez. In assuming office, Arias pledged to fervently audit and denounce cases of corruption left by the previous government. Within two weeks, the Ministry of Public Works and the Bolivian Highway Administrator (ABC) jointly presented a report on irregularities in the construction of the country's highway system, estimating economic damages of Bs81 million in 2019 alone. According to Arias, some seventy-five percent of road construction projects executed in the last thirteen years had severe deficiencies. In a meeting with Prosecutor General Juan Lanchipa, Arias presented a series of corruption cases against sixteen state entities, alleging irregularities in Bolivian Aviation (BOA) and the National Telecommunications Company (ENTEL), "suspicious" disbursements to Mi Teleférico, and the systemic "destruction" of the ministry's transparency units, among others accusations. In order to bring to light more such cases, Arias promoted a bill to protect individuals who denounce, with evidence, corruption in state institutions. "Many officials ... are silent for fear of being described as accomplices", Arias stated.

Nearing the end of the transitional government, Arias resigned from office, stating that he would wait for the newly designated authority to take the reins of command. Three days later, Arias personally delivered the keys to his office to his successor, Edgar Montaño, a gesture that went unrepeated in any of the other ministries. Montaño highlighted that fact, stating it was "gentlemanly [for Arias] to be here". For his part, Arias stated that "it cannot be that one goes, slams the door and leaves; from where I entered, the front door, I also have to leave".

== Mayor of La Paz ==
=== Election ===
Shortly after leaving office, Arias announced his intent to seek the La Paz mayoralty. Arias' decision to present his candidacy came as a surprise; he had previously affirmed that he would "surely return" to his private consulting practice. According to sociologist Ricardo Paz, Arias' participation in the controversial Áñez administration as well as allegations of corruption and mismanagement within the ministry recently under his tutelage led many to consider his changes of winning to be slim. Nonetheless, the former minister quickly moved to locate a political organization willing to sponsor his candidacy. By mid-November, Arias indicated that he was in ongoing talks with multiple fronts, including Civic Community (CC) and Sovereignty and Liberty (SOL.bo), the party of incumbent mayor Luis Revilla. However, the most fruitful negotiations were with indigenous leader Rafael Quispe. The pair jointly officialized their candidacies for mayor and governor, respectively, on 28 December, facilitated through For the Common Good – Somos Pueblo (PBCSP), an alliance sponsored by Suma Escoma, a small local organization, and the Social Democratic Movement (MDS), a party with minimal regional presence.

The eccentricities of Arias' campaign were a notable aspect of his run. His connection with superheroes became popular among supporters, who created and distributed action figures and comics representing him. Arias himself played into this, leading campaign marches with Captain America's shield in hand. At rallies, Arias would distribute small chocolates to supporters, dubbing them "Negro Kisses" as an allusion to his nickname. On political issues, Arias branded himself as a conciliatory figure, distancing himself from the typical government-opposition divide. He also pledged to reinvigorate the city, improving existing public works while creating new ones. "Being a mayor Attila who comes to burn the Library of Alexandria would be catastrophic", Aria stated while also arguing that the city could not continue in "lethargy ... as if everything has already been done".

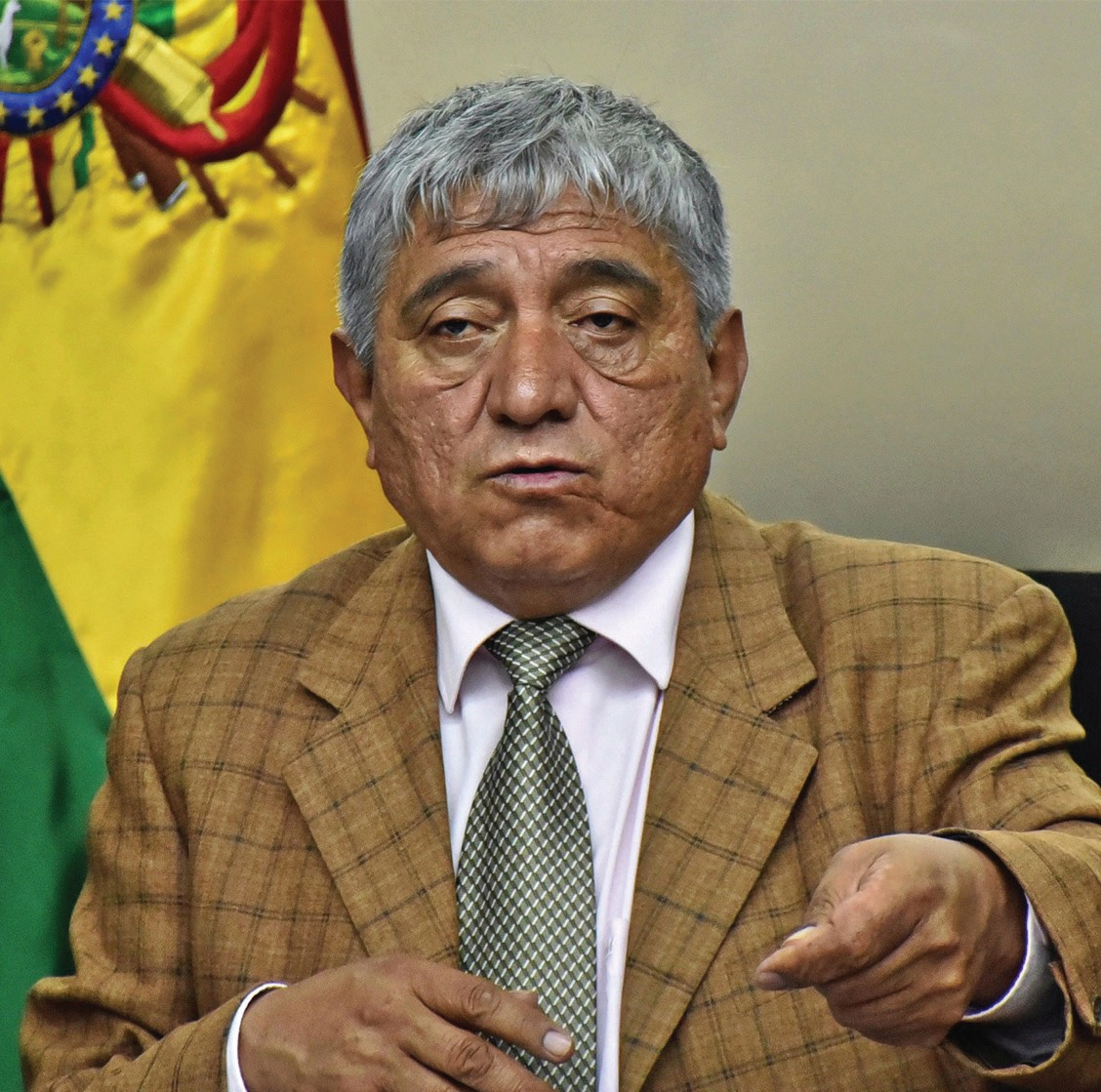
Arias speaking at a press conference, 7 September 2020.

Early opinion polling established Arias as the best positioned candidate to defeat the Movement for Socialism (MAS-IPSP)'s César Dockweiler. Though the MAS had never won the seat of government before, the presence of two strong opposition candidates—Arias and CC's Waldo Albarracín—threatened to disperse the vote in the ruling party's favor. However, in late January 2021, Albarracín unexpectedly withdrew from the race, citing a deterioration in his mental and physical health. Per an analysis by Brújula Digital, Albarracín's unexpected withdrawal practically paved the way for Arias to win the election, with polling indicating that two-thirds of Albarracín's voters would transfer their support to Arias if the former chose not to participate.

For the duration of the campaign, Arias continuously led in opinion polling, trailed by Dockweiler in second place. By election night, exit polls conducted by Ciesmori and Focaliza indicated that Arias was the virtual winner, attaining a significant plurality of just under fifty percent. Holding up the worn-out shoes on which he toured the city during the campaign, Arias celebrated his victory, pledging to make La Paz a "city of forgiveness and reconciliation". According to Paz, given Arias' lack of established political presence, "the only possible explanation for his successful performance is attributable to his charisma and the plain, direct, and populist way in which he managed to connect with the electorate". Arias' victory brought to a close a twenty-year period of political continuity in La Paz, the longest era of stability in its history.

=== Tenure ===
Arias was sworn in at the La Paz Palace of Justice at 12:00 p.m. on 3 May 2021. Upon taking the oath of office, Arias pledged "not stay at my desk", working "night and day" for the city. "La Paz is going to be on the move", he stated. One of the new mayor's first actions was to present his Immediate Action Plan (PAI), implemented through the end of 2021, with the participation of his appointed cabinet secretaries and district deputy mayors. The plan prioritized public health in the face of an emerging third wave of the pandemic and began the process of implementing the main pillars of Arias' mayoral campaign. Of these, the central tagline of Arias' campaign was "La Paz in Peace", through which the mayor sought to generate "peace among the people of La Paz". To do this, Arias promoted the "City of 1,000 Colors" project, in which the administration partnered with artisans, businesses, and schools to refurbish local public infrastructure. Several foreign embassies, including those of Spain and the United Kingdom, also expressed interest in supporting the mayor's initiative. The project's first phase was launched in late May 2021, with eight of the city's barrios benefiting from communal housing, newly paved roads, recreation areas, sports fields, and newly painted or repainted housing, pedestrian walkways, and other infrastructure. Additionally, Arias stated that all works would prioritize eco-efficiency in their plans, including the installation of solar panels, urban gardens, and water harvesting systems. A total of 7,079 residents benefitted from the project's first phase. In 2022, Arias inaugurated the fully renovated Alberto Saavedra Pérez Municipal Theater, restored to its original 1845 color. Though Arias' initiatives left him with high approval ratings among the city's inhabitants, the mayor also faced pushback for some of his plan's proposals, including the suggestion of raising taxes on homeowners who did not finish painting their facades. Critics also accused him of using State resources to paint public property in the color's of his alliance.

A major obstacle to Arias' mayoral tenure came as a result of the marginal majority the PBCSP alliance held in the municipal council. At just six seats to the MAS's five, the majority bloc necessitated unanimous support in order to carry out the mayor's agenda. Such unanimity was hampered by PBCSP's internal disunity, owing to opposing interests within the alliance. Namely, of the six councillors elected on PBCSP's list, only five responded directly to Arias, being part of For the Common Good, the mayor's fledgling civic group. Conversely, the sixth PBCSP councillor, Lourdes Chambilla, was a member of Somos Pueblo, the political party led by Rafael Quispe. Analysts noted that this situation gave Quispe the "golden vote" in the municipal council, given his status as Chambilla's coordinator and political advisor. Practically from the start of Arias' term, Chambilla declared herself neutral, casting her vote both in favor and against motions supported by the mayor.

Internal discrepancies boiled over in May 2022, during the annual reconfiguration of the municipal council's directive. PBCSP failed to nominate a united slate of candidates, with five councillors nominating Lucio Quispe to serve as the body's president while Chambilla presented herself. The MAS, seizing the opportunity, presented its own candidate. None of the three postulants attained a majority, leading the council to suspend the session. Arias denounced the fiasco as a "municipal coup d'état", accusing Quispe of "treason" against their shared alliance. With tensions between the two groups at their highest level, Arias and Quispe convened a meeting of the PBCSP caucus for 4 May. After a ten-hour period of consultation, Arias stated that "forgiveness, apologies, and consensus" had been obtained, with the For the Common Good and Somos Pueblo agreeing to nominate Yelka Maric as a consensus candidate.

=== Legal processes ===
Throughout his mayoral term, Arias faced a cavalcade of legal process instigated by the ruling party, cases he routinely denounced as acts of political persecution. Within twenty-four hours of assuming office, Arias was cited to testify before the Prosecutor's Office regarding allegations of illegal appointments, improper use of influence, and breach of duties. The accusations stemmed from Arias' appointment of a public official as director of the La Paz Communications Center despite the individual's lack of required credentials. In June 2021, Third Anti-Corruption Judge Claudia Castro placed Arias under a restriction order, barring him from leaving the country and ordering him to post recognizance totaling Bs30,00. Additionally, the mayor was required to present himself before the Prosecutor's Office every fifteen days. Arias denounced the ruling as having been made "at the service of the government", lamenting that the restrictions placed on him hindered his ongoing efforts to procure vaccines from foreign companies. However, the Prosecutor's Office also appealed the decision, demanding that Arias be placed under house arrest. Arias announced his own intent to appeal shortly thereafter. On 20 August, the Second Criminal Chamber of La Paz ratified the previous court's ruling.

Arias was also implicated in a corruption case in ENTEL, in which public officials were accused of illegally transferring US$390,000 to a shell corporation in Peru. The process resulted in the preventative detention of the company's former general manager, Eddy Luis Franco, for a period of six months. In an opinion peace for Brújula Digital, human rights activist Amparo Carvajal denounced Franco's arrest as an act of "judicialized political persecution" with "Arias [being] the true target [of the] case, for defeating the MAS in the municipal elections". "Franco ... will be imprisoned until he accuses Iván Arias", Carvajal stated.

By early March 2022, Página Siete counted a total of fourteen pending cases against Arias, the majority relating to his term as minister of public works. Including the ENTEL case and the process for illegal appointments and breach of duties, the mayor was accused of: improper sale of State lands to private individuals; sexual and workplace harassment; corruption in the purchase of biosecurity material; discrimination against his former electoral rival, César Dockweiler, when the latter was manager of Mi Teleférico; and finally, uneconomic conduct and improper use of public goods and services. As mayor, Arias faced legal processes for "political violence" against two deputy mayors whom he dismissed for corruption; irregular restitution of municipal officials to their previous posts; and an increase in the urban cleaning fee.

== Ideology and political positions ==
Arias' political ideology has its origins in far-left politics, owing to his Marxist background. Specifically, Arias defined himself as having been a Trotskyist, though comparatively "more liberal" in relation to the POR or figures such as Guillermo Lora. According to Arias, his membership in Escóbar's VO was "the only time" he was ever an active partisan of a political party. Since his return from exile, Arias has distanced himself from political labels. During a 2021 interview with Jimena Antelo on the program No Mentirás, Arias was directly asked whether he was on the left or the right, to which he answered that he was a democrat. He further elaborated that "epithets [and] adjectives are of little use to me". Arias' 2021 mayoral campaign—described by himself as having been largely based on "intangible" promises—has led many analysts to define his ideology as populist. Arias has rejected this term, stating that "the populist says anything, promises anything". Rather, he assured that his positions made him "close to the people", while remaining "socially and economically responsible". In her opinion column Desde la Tierra, journalist Lupe Cajías described Arias' statements and actions as being in tune with neo-populism.

== Electoral history ==
Year	Office	Party	Alliance	Votes			Result	Ref.
Year	Office	Party	Alliance	Total	%	P.	Result	Ref.
2002	Deputy	Independent	Nationalist Democratic Action	19,367	2.20%	8th (Note: Presented on an electoral list. The data shown represents the share of the vote the entire party/alliance received in that constituency.)	Lost	
2021	Mayor	For the Common Good	PBC-SP	263,511	49.52%	1st	Won	

Government offices
Preceded by Mario Galindo	Vice Minister of Strategic Planning and Popular Participation; 2001–2002	Succeeded by Marianela Zeballos
Political offices
Preceded by Yerko Núñez	Minister of Public Works, Services, and Housing; 2019–2020	Succeeded by Edgar Montaño
Preceded by Luis Revilla	Mayor of La Paz; 2021–present	Succeeded by César Dockweiler
