= Revilla =

Revilla is a surname. Notable people with the surname include:

- Bartolomé Revilla (1867–1922), Filipino lawyer, judge, law professor and politician
- Bong Revilla (born 1966), Philippine politician
- Bryan Revilla (born 1986), Filipino politician
- Carlos Revilla (1933–2000), Spanish voice actor and director
- Denden Lazaro-Revilla (born 1992), Filipina volleyball player
- Gabby Revilla (born 1982), Nicaraguan film director
- Jolo Revilla (born 1988), Filipino actor and comedian
- Juan Carlos Revilla, Anglican bishop
- LA Revilla (born 1989), Filipino basketball player
- Luis Revilla (born 1972), Bolivian politician
- Luisa Revilla (1971–2021), Peruvian politician
- Miguel Ángel Revilla (born 1943), Spanish politician and economist
- Norma Salinas Revilla (born 1977), Peruvian biologist
- Noʻu Revilla, American poet
- Ram Revilla (1988–2011), Philippine actor
- Ramon Revilla Sr. (1927–2020), Philippine politician
- Strike Revilla (born 1970), Philippine politician

== See also ==
- Revilla Vallejera, municipality and town located in the province of Burgos, Castile and León, Spain
- Revilla, León
- Revillagigedo Island
