= 2021 La Paz municipal election =

Bolivian election

- 7 March 2021

Mayor, all 11 seats in the Municipal Council 6 seats needed for a majority
- Opinion polls
- Registered: 645,000
- Turnout: 86.70% (▼2.15 pp)
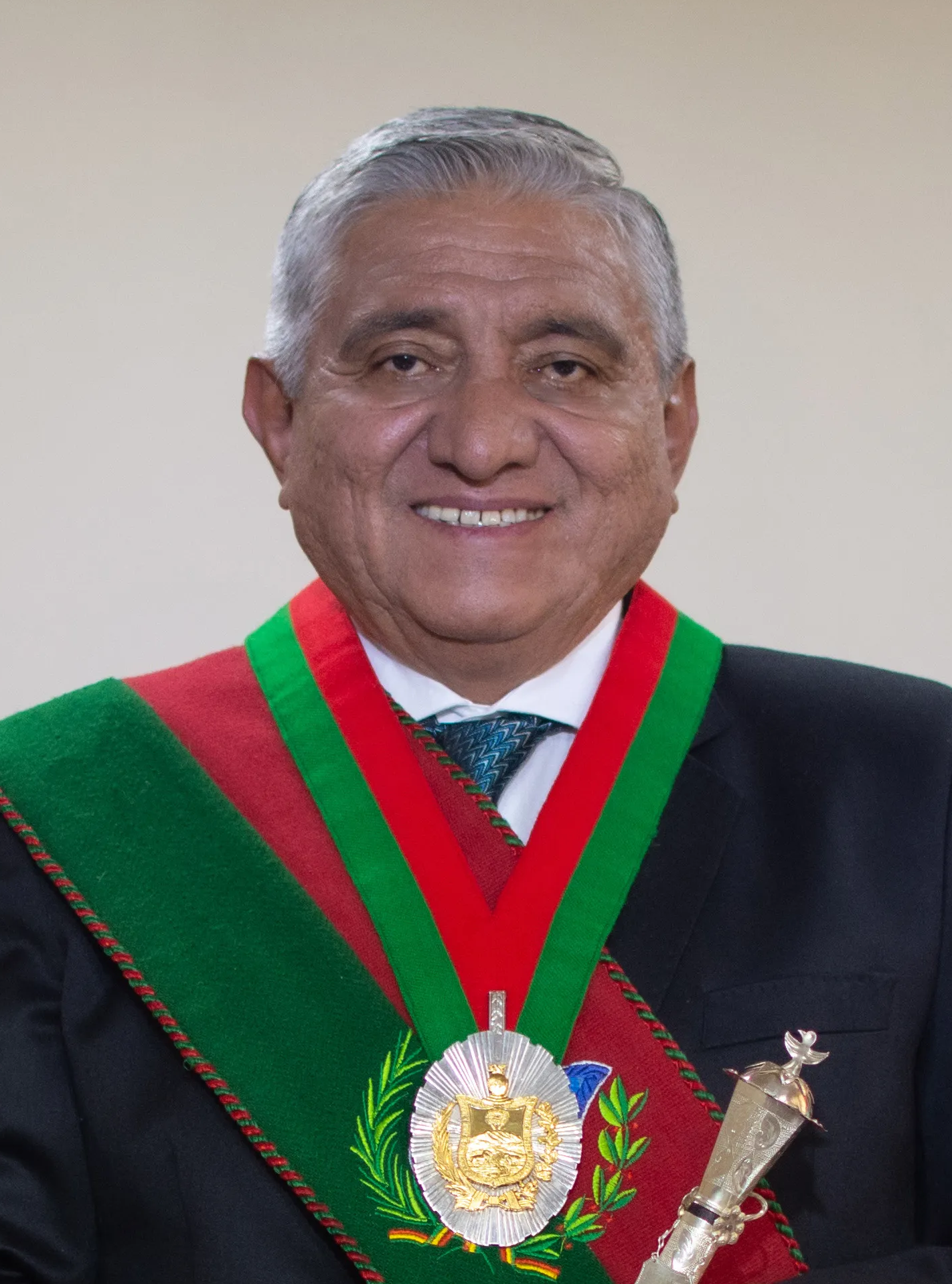

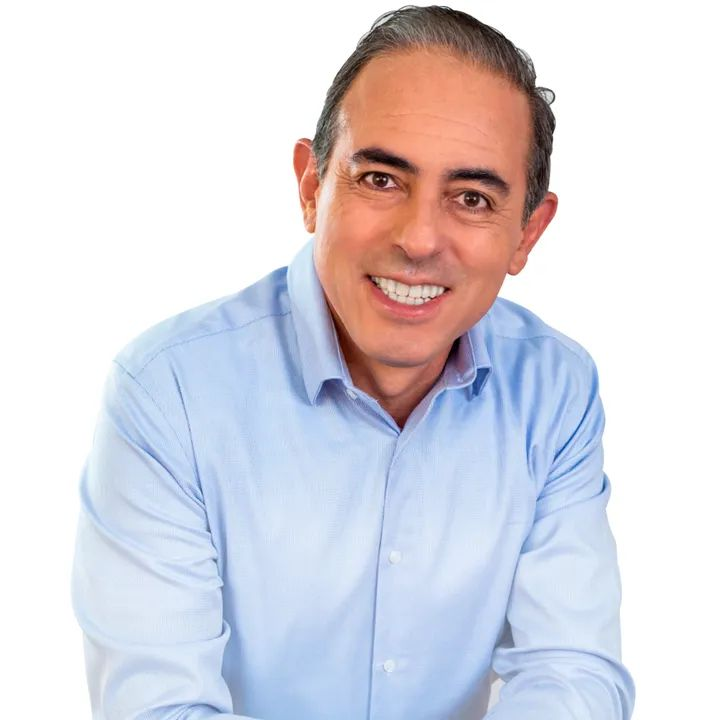
	First party	Second party
Candidate	Iván Arias	César Dockweiler
Leader	Rafael Quispe	Evo Morales
Party	PBC	MAS-IPSP
Alliance	PBCSP (Note: Coalition between For the Common Good and Somos Pueblo, legally registered by the Social Democratic Movement and Suma Escoma.)	—
Last election	New alliance	4 seats, 39.28%
Seats won	6	5
Popular vote	263,511	201,211
Percentage	49.52%	37.82%
Swing	New alliance	▼1.46 pp
	Third party	Fourth party
Candidate	David Castro	Álvaro Blondel
Leader	Leopoldo Chui	Luis Revilla
Party	J.A.LLALLA.L.P.	SOL.bo
Last election	New party	7 seats, 58.09%
Seats won	0	0
Popular vote	29,793	13,900
Percentage	5.60%	2.61%
Swing	New party	▼55.48 pp
Mayor before election
Luis Revilla
SOL.bo
Mayor after election
Iván Arias
PBCSP

The 2021 La Paz municipal election was held in La Paz, Bolivia on Sunday, 7 March 2021, involving separate contests for mayor and all eleven municipal council seats. Incumbent mayor Luis Revilla was eligible to seek a third term but declined, leaving the mayoralty an open contest. The election was won by former minister of public works Iván Arias of the Somos Pueblo alliance, who attained a near absolute majority of 49.52 percent against a field of ten other candidates. On the municipal ballot, Somos Pueblo won 48.04 percent of the vote, winning the six seats needed to exercise a simple majority on the municipal council, with the Movement for Socialism taking the remaining five seats. Revilla's party, Sovereignty and Liberty, lost both the mayoralty and all representation on the municipal council, concluding a twenty-year period of political continuity that started in 2000 with the assumption of Juan del Granado.

Originally scheduled to take place in early 2020, this and other subnational elections were delayed by over a year as a result of the country's 2019 political crisis and the ongoing effects of the COVID-19 pandemic. Amid a rapidly shifting political landscape and no popular incumbent on the ballot, over a dozen fronts registered candidates, the most since 2004. For the nationally governing Movement for Socialism, this crowded opposition field—including two popular competing candidates in Waldo Albarracín and Iván Arias—provided an opportunity for the party to win the capital for the first time in its history. However, those prospects quickly faded following Albarracín's withdrawal, a move that established Arias as the clear frontrunner for the duration of the race. This, combined with Arias's active and unique campaign style, allowed him to garner nearly half of the total popular vote, with the remaining fifty percent divided ten ways between the other candidates.

== Background and electoral system ==
In the 2015 municipal elections, incumbent mayor Luis Revilla, leading the newly-founded Sovereignty and Liberty (SOL.bo), successfully won reelection to a second term by a margin of 58.09 percent of the popular vote to his closest competitor's 39.28 percent. Since 2000, La Paz had experienced the longest period of political continuity in its history, starting with the two consecutive terms of Juan del Granado, followed by the election of his heir, Revilla, from 2010 to 2015. The mayor's reelection to a second term represented a continuation of that stability. As with other departmental, provincial, and municipal elected officials, Revilla and the municipal council's set term of office was due to expire in mid-2020, completing a five-year mandate started in 2015. However, due to the annulment of the 2019 general election results as an outcome of that year's political crisis, the terms of all subnational authorities were extended until after new national elections had taken place.

The Supreme Electoral Tribunal (TSE) issued the call for subnational elections on 10 November 2020, scheduling them to be held on 7 March 2021. Individuals aged 18 by the election date or who had recently changed residency could register to vote between 3 and 17 December. 28 December was set as the deadline for political organizations to register their candidacies. For all 336 autonomous municipal governments, the electoral system has been in continuous use since 2010, involving separate contests for mayor as the executive authority and all seats in the legislative body, known as the municipal council. All mayoralties are elected by a simple majority in a first-past-the-post system. Seats on the municipal council are elected on a separate electoral list, allocated proportionally using the D'Hondt method. As one of the eighteen municipalities with more than 75,000 inhabitants, La Paz counts eleven seats on its municipal council.

== Candidates and campaigns ==
=== Somos Pueblo ===
An early entry in the mayoral race was Iván "Negro" Arias, the outgoing minister of public works in the government of Jeanine Áñez. A municipalist, Arias had an extensive history in local matters, having been part of the team that drafted the Law of Popular Participation, which paved the way for the direct election of municipal authorities, substantially decentralizing the country. Arias's decision to present his candidacy came as a surprise; he had previously affirmed that he would "surely return" to his private consulting practice. According to sociologist Ricardo Paz, Arias's involvement with the controversial Áñez administration, as well as allegations of corruption and mismanagement within the ministry recently under his tutelage, led many to consider his chances of winning to be slim.

Nonetheless, Arias quickly moved to locate a political organization willing to sponsor his candidacy. By mid-November, despite ongoing talks with other fronts, Arias indicated that he was closest to reaching an agreement with Rafael Quispe. The indigenous leader had been considering three potential contenders on his shortlist of mayoral candidates, including Arias, as well as former vice minister of public security Wilson Santamaría and Quispe's former lawyer, Eduardo León. Ultimately, he went with Arias, with the pair jointly officializing their candidacies for mayor and governor, respectively, on 28 December, facilitated through For the Common Good – Somos Pueblo (PBCSP), an alliance between the newly-established civic group For the Common Good, led by Arias, and Quispe's existing Somos Pueblo party. As both lacked legal registration, PBCSP was sponsored by Suma Escoma, a small local organization, and the Social Democratic Movement, a national party with minimal regional presence.

The eccentricities of Arias's campaign received heavy media attention. The political analyst had previously been notable for his unique way of explaining and exemplifying political issues, employing toys and making allusions to popular culture. The figure of superheroes became a central aspect of his campaign, with Arias leading campaign events followed by supporters dressed as Marvel characters. An action figure and a Facebook page with comics portraying Arias made the rounds on the Internet, with Arias himself distributing chocolates, dubbed "Negro Kisses", at campaign rallies. On political issues, Arias branded himself as a conciliatory figure, seeking to achieve "reconciliation" and "common good" in a city often racked with political instability. He also pledged to reinvigorate the city, improving existing public works while creating new ones. "Being a mayor Attila who comes to burn the Library of Alexandria would be catastrophic," Arias stated while arguing that the city could not continue in "lethargy ... as if everything has already been done."

=== Movement for Socialism ===
==== Pre-candidates ====
A total of nine major contenders were declared as pre-candidates for the MAS nomination:

- César Dockweiler, manager of Mi Teleférico (2012–2019).
- Sonia Brito, vice minister of consumer protection (2012–2014), deputy for La Paz C-08 (2015–2020).
- Remberto Calani, substitute deputy for La Paz C-08 (2015–2020).
- Sebastián Michel, vice minister of communication management (2012–2014), ambassador of Bolivia to Venezuela (2018–2019).
- Omar Rocha, La Paz municipal councillor (2010–2014), acting mayor of La Paz (2014–2015).
- Jorge Silva, deputy for La Paz C-11 (2006–2010), La Paz municipal councillor (2010–2014; 2015–2020), vice minister of consumer protection (2020–present).
- Jesús Vera, candidate for ombudsman in 2016, candidate for deputy for La Paz in 2019.
- José Antonio Zamora, minister of environment and water (2012–2015).
- Javier Zavaleta, deputy for La Paz C-06; formerly C-08 (2006–2014; 2015–2018), minister of defense (2018–2019).

==== Selection process ====
Within the Movement for Socialism (MAS-IPSP), the candidate selection process operates under the framework of pluralism. Local party branches and affiliated social organizations are tasked with selecting pre-candidates, who are then evaluated by the party's leadership. The official nomination is a choice made solely by party leaders, together with allied social organizations. A variety of prominent political leaders sought the nomination, with César Dockweiler, former manager of Mi Teleférico, profiled as an early favorite among party cadres. Conversely, José Antonio Zamora, former minister of environment and water, saw high support among social organizations and trade unions. Another notable contender was Omar Rocha, a former member and president of the municipal council. A dissident of the opposition, Rocha was the only candidate with mayoral experience, having been elected acting mayor in late 2014 in the absence of Revilla, who had resigned to seek reelection. Other pre-candidates included Javier Zavaleta, former minister of defense; Sebastián Michel, MAS party spokesman; Sonia Brito, former deputy; Remberto Calani, former substitute deputy; Jorge Silva, vice minister of consumer protection; and Jesús Vera, candidate for deputy in 2019.

On 14 December, MAS leaders officialized Dockweiler as the party's mayoral candidate, a decision corroborated by party president Evo Morales days later. According to Morales, Dockweiler's nomination had near-consensus support among party leaders and social organizations, a notable fact, given ongoing disputes in other regions due to a lack of consensus over the nomination of candidates. Nonetheless, Dockweiler's candidacy was quickly put into question by opposing forces, who conveyed their intention to challenge his legal registration. The controversy arose from the fact that Dockweiler had fled the country in 2019, declaring himself a victim of political persecution by the Áñez administration; he only returned in late 2020. Per registration requirements, candidates seeking to hold office must have been permanent residents of their departments for a period of at least two years immediately prior to the election. Dockweiler rejected this reasoning, arguing that his residence and work had always been in La Paz, stating that residency and temporary stay could not be equated. Ultimately, the TSE opted to authorize his candidacy, citing a Plurinational Constitutional Court (TCP) ruling granting precautionary measures in favor of "asylees and political refugees."

=== Sovereignty and Liberty ===
Incumbent mayor Luis Revilla was eligible to seek a third term, owing to a TCP ruling that voided Article 168 of the Constitution, thus abolishing term limits for all elected officials. Revilla had been a vocal opponent of this decision, at the time objecting to the fact it allowed then-president Morales to seek a fourth term. By late November 2020, Revilla had confirmed his decision to not seek a second reelection, with an internal primary scheduled for 20 November. According to Departmental Assemblyman Edwin Herrera, the primary process was intended to elect SOL.bo's departmental leader and to define a preferred candidate among the party's partisans. However, the winner would not necessarily receive the nomination, with SOL.bo leaving the door open to nominating a non-party partisan with greater support among the population. Nonetheless, multiple municipal officials presented themselves as pre-candidates for the nomination, among them: Álvaro Blondel, executive secretary of the mayoralty; Álvaro Siles, municipal secretary; Oscar Sogliano, deputy mayor for La Paz's southern zone; and Fernando Valencia, deputy mayor for La Paz's central macrodistrict. Blondel emerged victorious, attaining the votes of two thousand of the more than six thousand participating SOL.bo partisans.

Concurrent to its internal primaries, SOL.bo's leadership held a series of meetings with other prominent organizations in an effort to consolidate a political alliance. According to Revilla, the party had initiated dialogue with leaders of Civic Community (CC) and the National Unity Front (UN) and has been in contact with Quispe and Arias, with whom the most contentious talks occurred. Per Arias's account, Revilla had demanded continued control over the municipal council, considering that the former minister lacked an established party structure in the city; the two ultimately failed to reach an agreement. Conversely, negotiations with CC and UN proved fruitful, with all three groups forming the United for La Paz alliance. SOL.bo had a history of alignment with both fronts; in 2019, Revilla supported Carlos Mesa's presidential bid as part of the CC alliance, and until recently, he had joined Samuel Doria Medina's UN in supporting Áñez's failed presidential candidacy. The tripartite front presented Waldo Albarracín, former ombudsman and rector of the Higher University of San Andrés, as its mayoral candidate. The disposition of the alliance's three primary leaders remained stable until the very final hours prior to its official registration when, in a surprise move, Revilla broke SOL.bo's alliance with CC and UN, registering Blondel as his party's mayoral candidate. The sudden reversal owed to disagreements over the alliance's electoral list, in which CC included an ex-official that Revilla had removed from office as a candidate for councillor. Per SOL.bo's account, CC was unwilling to remove the individual from the list, while sources close to CC claimed that Revilla would not even accept the replacement candidate put forward.

Shortly into the campaign season, Albarracín withdrew his candidacy, citing a deterioration in his physical and mental health, owing to ongoing criminal processes initiated by the government against him, actions he qualified as a "dirty war [meant] ... to make my subsequent imprisonment viable." The loss of Albarracín signified the final collapse of the United for La Paz alliance. Shortly thereafter, CC announced that it would no longer seek to participate in the municipal election, thus removing itself from the contest. On 4 February, Mesa conveyed his bloc's decision to endorse Arias's campaign, considering him the only viable candidate capable of defeating the MAS.

=== Other political organizations ===
Eight minor fronts presented their own mayoral candidates. One of the earliest candidates to declare was Amilcar Barral, former substitute deputy for the Democratic Unity alliance. Barral had announced his intention to run as far back as September 2019, when it was expected that the election would take place in early 2020. When Quispe announced his intention to run for governor, he floated Barral as a possible companion on Somos Pueblo's mayoral ticket. Barral and Quispe had an extensive personal history as colleagues in the legislature, though the latter's split from UN in early 2019 had fractured their relationship. By late 2020, despite Quispe's statements, Barral remained lukewarm on the prospect of joining Somos Pueblo, stating that the indigenous leader's participation in the Áñez administration had not helped his political future. Barral ultimately launched his own mayoral campaign as part of the Peace is Possible alliance, led by his own political organization, New Alliance Bolivia. Though he did not discard reaching an agreement with Quispe, negotiations never fully panned out, with the Bolivian National Action Party (PAN-BOL) finally agreeing to sponsor his campaign.

Though PAN-BOL attempted to expand its alliance to include more fronts, agreements failed to materialize. In early December, Barral stated that his campaign had entered negotiations with Solidarity Civic Unity (UCS) to include it as part of the alliance. Instead, UCS opted to present its own candidate, nominating former UN deputy Peter Maldonado. Similarly, PAN-BOL initially announced that popular cumbia singer David Castro had joined the party's electoral list as its candidate for councillor. However, Castro later abandoned PAN-BOL to launch his own mayoral candidacy at the invitation of Jallalla La Paz. Given the wide array of candidates, Barral ultimately withdrew his name from contention mere hours before the election, endorsing PBCSP's campaign.

Other candidates included Ronald Escobar, departmental president of the Third System Movement, led by Governor Félix Patzi, and Luis Larrea, president of the Departmental Medical Association of La Paz. The latter received the nomination of United Invincible (UI), led by Libre 21, an alliance between former president Jorge Quiroga and the Revolutionary Nationalist Movement. The Movement for Sovereignty, which had been part of Libre 21 when that alliance sponsored Quiroga's 2020 presidential campaign, opted to run its own candidate, nominating journalist Juan Carlos Arana. In February 2021, the Departmental Electoral Tribunal disqualified Larrea's candidacy for failing to resign as a presenter on his University Television health program. The decision was later overturned by the TSE just four days before the election date.

== Opinion polling ==
Date(s)	Pollster	Client	Arias	Dockweiler	Castro	Blondel	Arana	Larrea	Maldonado	ASP (Note: Focaliza 2: Xavier Iturralde Focaliza 1: Alberto Miranda Ciesmori 3–4: Xavier Iturralde Ciesmori 2: Alberto Miranda)	Escobar	Encinas	Barral	Other	None	Lead
7 Mar (Note: Exit poll.)	Cisemori	UNITEL	48.0%	35.9%	6.7%	4.4%	1.1%	0.6%	0.6%	0.5%	1.0%	0.6%	0.6%	N/A	N/A	12.1%
7 Mar	Focaliza	Bolivisión	49.7%	32.0%	5.7%	2.8%	2.2%	0.6%	0.4%	0.0%	0.3%	0.7%	0.9%	1.1% (Note: PDC ballot: 0.8% FPV ballot: 0.2% CC ballot: 0.1%)	3.6% (Note: Blank/None: 1.4% Null: 1.3% Secret: 0.9%)	17.7%
25 Feb	Ciesmori	UNITEL	50.8%	24.3%	4.5%	1.8%	1.7%	0.5%	0.0%	0.2%	0.2%	0.3%	0.8%	N/A	14.9% (Note: Blank/None: 4.4% Null: 0.5% Undecided: 10%)	26.5%
21 Feb	Focaliza	Bolivisión	40.2%	30.3%	3.4%	4.1%	1.6%	1.2%	0.0%	0.0%	0.9%	0.3%	1.2%	0.4% (Note: CC ballot.)	16.5% (Note: Blank/None: 7.4% Null: 1.3% Undecided: 7.8%)	9.9%
11 Feb	Ciesmori	UNITEL	42.5%	23.7%	3.6%	2.0%	3.5%	2.4%	0.1%	0.7%	0.2%	0.7%	0.5%	N/A	20.1% (Note: Blank/None: 4.8% Null: 0.4% Undecided: 14.9%)	18.8%
24 Jan	Ciesmori	UNITEL	20.0%	27.6%	4.1%	1.4%	3.4%	4.1%	N/A	N/A	N/A	0.5%	1.8%	16.2% (Note: Waldo Albarracín.)	20.8% (Note: Blank/None: 2.9% Null: 1.1% Undecided: 16.8%)	7.6%

== Results ==
=== Mayoral ===
Of the nine departmental capitals plus El Alto, La Paz was a city that the ruling MAS had never been able to govern over. On this occasion, the dispersion of support between two strong opposition candidates, Albarracín and Arias, gave Dockweiler a key early advantage. This was demonstrated by the first official poll by Ciesmori, which found that Dockweiler would win with twenty-seven percent of the vote, with Arias and Albarracín taking twenty and sixteen percent, respectively. Per an analysis by Brújula Digital, Albarracín's unexpected withdrawal virtually paved the way for Arias to win the election, with polling indicating that two-thirds of Albarracín's voters would transfer their support to Arias if the former chose not to participate.

For the duration of the campaign following Albarracín's withdrawal, Arias continuously led in opinion polling, trailed by Dockweiler in second place. By election night, exit polls conducted by Ciesmori and Focaliza indicated that Arias was the virtual winner, attaining a significant plurality of just under fifty percent. Holding up the worn-out shoes on which he toured the city during the campaign, Arias celebrated his victory, pledging to make La Paz a "city of forgiveness and reconciliation," regardless of political identity. According to Ricardo Paz, given Arias's lack of established political presence, "the only possible explanation for his successful performance is attributable to his charisma and the plain, direct, and populist way in which he managed to connect with the electorate."

Candidate	Party	Votes	%
Iván Arias	For the Common Good – Somos Pueblo	263,511	49.52
César Dockweiler	Movement for Socialism	201,211	37.82
David Castro	Jallalla La Paz	29,793	5.60
Álvaro Blondel	Sovereignty and Liberty	13,900	2.61
Juan Carlos Arana	Movement for Sovereignty	8,976	1.69
Luis Larrea	For my La Paz – United Invincible (Note: Coalition between Libre 21 and the Revolutionary Nationalist Movement.)	3,744	0.70
Peter Maldonado	Solidarity Civic Unity	3,281	0.62
Xavier Iturralde	Patriotic Social Alliance	2,473	0.46
Ronald Escobar	Third System Movement	2,225	0.42
José Manuel Encinas	Venceremos	1,945	0.37
Amilcar Barral	Bolivian National Action Party	1,024	0.19
Total		532,083	100.00
Valid votes		532,083	95.15
Invalid/blank votes		27,122	4.85
Total votes		559,205	100.00
Registered voters/turnout		645,000	86.70
Source: Plurinational Electoral Organ | Electoral Atlas

=== Municipal council ===
Composition of the municipal council following the election.

Party	Votes	%	Seats
For the Common Good – Somos Pueblo	205,447	48.04	6
Movement for Socialism	155,725	36.41	5
Jallalla La Paz	26,702	6.24	–
Sovereignty and Liberty	17,708	4.14	–
Movement for Sovereignty	6,747	1.58	–
For my La Paz – United Invincible	3,808	0.89	–
Solidarity Civic Unity	2,894	0.68	–
Venceremos	2,553	0.60	–
Patriotic Social Alliance	2,328	0.54	–
Third System Movement	2,211	0.52	–
Bolivian National Action Party	1,531	0.36	–
Total	427,654	100.00	11
Valid votes	427,654	76.62	
Invalid/blank votes	130,511	23.38	
Total votes	558,165	100.00	
Registered voters/turnout	645,000	86.54	
Source: Plurinational Electoral Organ | Electoral Atlas

== Aftermath ==
Arias's victory brought to a close a twenty-year period of political continuity in La Paz, the longest era of stability in its history. SOL.bo lost both the mayoralty and all presence on the municipal council, with analysts pointing to Revilla's neglect of municipal administration in favor of national aspirations as having taken a toll on his political project, a fate that similarly befell del Granado's Fearless Movement years prior. For his part, del Granado stated that Revilla's mistake was not having fostered a worthy successor sooner: "[Blondel] should have been promoted in a timely manner; publicly ... promoting a figure in just three months is a very difficult task."

For Arias, who was sworn in as mayor on 3 May, the primary obstacle to governing came about through PBCSP's marginal majority on the municipal council. At just six seats to the MAS's five, the majority bloc necessitated unanimous support in order to push through the mayor's agenda. Such unanimity was hampered by internal discrepancies between the five PBCSP councillors who responded directly to Arias and the sole member, Lourdes Chambilla, whose loyalties lay with Quispe. For many analysts, Chambilla's outsized power to make or break Arias's legislative agenda granted Quispe the "golden vote" in the municipal council. This contentious situation quickly led to a deterioration in relations between the two figures, and though attempts at reconciliation were made, by late 2022, Quispe had chosen to de facto dissolve the PBCSP alliance, calling it "politically broken." For his part, Arias lamented that he had been "tied hand and foot"; "the mayor's head [has been] handed over to the enemy ... that is really not right."
