= Non-English versions of The Simpsons =

The Simpsons is an American animated sitcom broadcast by the Fox Broadcasting Company since 1989.In other countries, the television show started its broadcasts after 1989 either in its original English-language version or in a dubbed version.

== By language ==
=== Arabic ===
The show was first broadcast in the area in English with Arabic subtitles on networks like Showtime Arabia and Dubai's One TV, where it received a following in the area.

The show was finally dubbed into Arabic in September 2005, under the title "Al-Shamshoon" (Arabic: آل شمشون, romanized: ʾĀl Shamshūn, lit. 'The Shamshoons'). In addition to being dubbed in Arabic (with subtitles provided for shots including written English, such as the chalkboards), references to alcohol, pork, and numerous other themes have been deleted or significantly modified. For instance, Homer drinks soda-pop instead of beer, and eats beef sausages and hot dogs as opposed to pork, while shots of him eating bacon and pork rinds were removed entirely. He also eats ka'ak instead of donuts, and all references to Moe's Tavern were cut. References to Rabbi Krustofsky, Krusty the Clown's father, were removed as well. According to Richard Poplak of the CBC, an ex-Disney employee in Lebanon told him that, in Poplak's words, "if a TV station can help it, they’ll excise references to Judaism from shows meant for the pan-Arab market." Badih Fattouh, MBC 1's acquisitions and drama commissioner head, said, "You must understand that we did not simply dub, but we Arabized the concept, and we toned it down a bit. We toned [down] the language—we Arabized it in the cultural sense."

MBC 1, a company owned by Saudi Arabian sheiks, created the Arabic adaptation. Amr Hosny, a scriptwriter who frequently adapts works for the Arab world, served as the writer. The creative personalities behind Al-Shamshoon were Egyptian. The producers decided to adapt the "classic" episodes, beginning with Season 4, rather than starting with the original episodes. The characters were also given typical Arabic names such as Omar, Mona, Beesa and Badr for Homer, Marge, Lisa and Bart, respectively, as part of the retooling, while voices were provided by leading actors including Egyptian film star Mohamed Henedi as "Omar". Their hometown "Springfield" was called "Rabeea" (Arabic for spring) and made it look like an American town with a major Arab population. Poplak said, "Although Fattouh and MBC will give no figures, the licence fees from 20th Century Fox could not have been cheap."

About the original series, Hosny said, "I loved it. I take off my chapeau: they are very good artists. And the writers are unbelievable. I loved the character of Homer. There is something very strange about this character. It’s very close to the Egyptian point of view. He’s a very simple and kind person; from some points of view you feel that he’s incredibly stupid, and from some points of view you feel he is wise. Sometimes I felt I was talking about an Egyptian person. Nothing is certain and taken for granted—it’s not ipso facto—and this makes good art". Hosny said that the sheiks who owned MBC interfered in the creative process, making the show more edited and less comprehensible. For instance, Hosny wanted to make a "Little Arab Town" where it would be explained why there were many Arab people living in the middle of the United States. The sheiks rejected Hosny's suggestions. Poplak said, "Instead, Springfield remained, and there was no coherent explanation given as to why a full Arab community exists within the middle of Middle America". Hosny wanted Homer to drink she'er, a non-alcoholic malt drink, so dubbing would be easy. The sheiks insisted that Homer should drink juice. Hosny also stated that he tried to underemphasize Waylon Smithers's homosexual attraction to Mr. Burns. Poplak said, "Through a steady process of cross-cultural attrition—no bacon sandwiches, no Moe’s Tavern, church becomes masjid (mosque)—The Simpsons was whittled down to a shadow of itself."

The show debuted after al-Iftar on October 4, 2005, the first night of Ramadan. The show overall had a poor reception. Fattouh said, "The show was not a big success. Otherwise, of course, we would have continued to do another season. I would say it was fairly received, but average. This made us reconsider". Poplak said, "That’s putting it mildly. MBC’s core viewers were baffled. From most accounts, the show was incoherent". The MBC show had a poor reception in the Saudi Arabian market, described by Poplak as "all-important". Cartoons in Saudi Arabia are perceived as being for children, and adults, puzzled at why cartoons were airing during the post-Iftar time, chose to watch other channels. Arabs who were fans of The Simpsons also had a negative reaction. As'ad AbuKhalil, a professor at California State University, Stanislaus and a blogger who operates the "Angry Arab News Service," (Arabic: وكالة أنباء العربي الغاضب) said that after he saw a promotional segment, "This is just beyond the pale[.]" and "It was just painful. ... The guy who played Homer Simpson was one of the most unfunny people I ever watched. Just drop the project, and air reruns of Tony Danza's show instead." Fattouh added "You see, culturally, it didn’t cross very well. Maybe the sense of humour is too North American. Comedy is especially a culturally sensitive matter. What you can define as funny is an outcome of learnings, habits, doings, local behaviour—it is the sum of so many factors. Drama is one thing, but with comedy, it is black and white. Deep inside, either you laugh or you say, ‘No, this is not funny.’ They did not think this was funny". As a result, only 34 of the 52 adapted episodes aired.

Poplak said, "It is a lesson in cross-cultural adaptation, and a warning of how delicate a powerful piece of television art like The Simpsons actually is."

The show in its unedited form currently airs on Fox Series in English with Arabic subtitles.

=== Catalan ===
Antena 3 aired the show in Catalan for a brief period (within 1995) in Catalonia. They dubbed four seasons.

=== Czech ===
The Simpsons ("Simpsonovi") in Czech is broadcast in the Czech Republic and Slovakia, premiering on January 8, 1993, on Czech Television, who broadcast the series until 2010, when the Czech broadcast rights were bought by Prima Cool. The late actress Helena Štáchová provided the voice of Lisa Simpson until 2017; since then, Ivana Korolová has voiced Lisa. Popular Czech actor Jiří Lábus voices Marge Simpson. Martin Dejdar voices Bart and Vlastimil Bedrna voiced Homer until the 12th season and Vlastimil Zavřel voices him since 13th season.

=== French ===
The Simpsons has been dubbed into the French language twice, once in the Canadian province of Quebec and again in France. The show is titled "Les Simpson" in both regions, following local orthography standards. The French audio on most Region 1 DVDs is the Quebec dub, although very early releases used the European French dub instead. It is one of only a handful of American television shows that have wholly separate versions in Quebec and France, and a number of studies have been made comparing them. In France all the characters speak standard French, with the exception of the ethnic minorities: Apu is given a Goan Portuguese accent, while black characters such as Carl, who have American accents in the English version, speak with inflected accents typical of North African immigrants. Kirk Van Houten is given a stereotypical Brussels accent, as "Van Houten" is a name which can be assumed to be Belgian. In the Quebec version, blue-collar workers like Homer and Barney Gumble speak with a heavy joual drawl whereas the town élite, such as Principal Skinner and Reverend Lovejoy, speak with a French accent. In the Quebec version the ethnic minorities also have accents. Noticeably, Carl has the accent of a Black immigrant from Haiti.

Local idioms are occasionally adopted in place of direct translation. American cultural and political jokes are occasionally replaced with local references. For instance, a reference to Newt Gingrich in Quebec is generally replaced with one to Mike Harris. Most of the recurring characters keep their English names in each French version. Two exceptions are Sideshow Bob and Sideshow Mel, who are known as Tahiti Bob and Tahiti Mel in France, as the word sideshow has no direct translation. In Quebec, the title sideshow is kept as an Anglicism. Another exception is made for the Simpsons family's dog, Santa's Little Helper, who is called "Le p'tit renne au nez rouge" (the French name for the song "Rudolph the Red-Nosed Reindeer", which literally means "Little Red-Nosed Reindeer") in the Quebec version and "Petit Papa Noël" (name of a French Christmas song that literally means "Little Father Christmas") in the French one.

In addition, although the location and setting of the show are not changed in the Quebec dub (still takes place in the United States), many references to the characters watching American TV shows, movies, etc. are changed to references to Québécois ones. For example, a reference to Homer watching CSI: Miami in the original was changed to Fortier, a similar Québécois show. Although these changed references would be familiar to the French-Canadian viewer, in real life these would be awkward because almost all Québécois media is unknown in the United States. This is an example of localizing the humour for the Quebec market. In the episode "Lisa's Rival", Bart's mention of getting Millhouse Van Houten on America's Most Wanted, is simply changed for "on television". In addition, most instances of the word "English" are changed to "French". Due to this, in one episode where Homer visits Canada, the roles of anglophones and francophones are completely reversed, resulting in a stereotypical English-Canadian speaking French and a stereotypical French-Canadian speaking English. In another episode, English-Canadians were given stereotypical American accents speaking French, even when the main characters from the U.S.A. were not. The same practice is done in the Quebec dub of King of the Hill, done by the same company and many of the same actors, but to a greater extent: instead of taking place in Arlen, Texas, the show takes place in Sainte-Irène, Quebec, and many of the characters' names are changed. However, American and Texas flags along with pictures of Texas state (such as on the side of police cars) are not edited.

Generally, names are pronounced according to French pronunciation rules. For example, Milhouse van Houten sounds like Meeloose Vanooten. Marge, the ge is pronounced /ʒ/ instead of /dʒ/, in Homer, the h is mute. The u in Krusty is pronounced as /œ/ as usual in French if words derive from English language such as club. Other names are slightly different such as Edna Krabappel who is named Edna Krapabelle. Unlike in the original version, some names are stressed on the second syllable like Li'Sa, Mag'Gie or Nel'Son.

The episodes are dubbed by a team of voice actors, similar to the one that does the original. The team does about two episodes per day. In general these voice actors also do the characters who were voiced by celebrities in the American version. In the French version, on occasion, official dubbers are brought in. For instance, in the episode "The Springfield Files", where agents Mulder and Scully from The X-Files appear the voice actors who do their voices on the French version of the X-Files guest starred.

Up to a certain point, the animation of the show was not changed, and what is written in English appears in English, either subtitled in French or spoken by a character in French, in the two French versions. One important exception is the blackboard joke at the beginning of each episode. While the France version kept the original English, translating in the subtitles, the Quebec version changed the writing on the board directly to French. However, for later episodes of the Quebec version, other text was changed as well, such as movie titles ("Cosmic Wars" became "La guerre de l'espace" [Space War] in the episode "Co-Dependents' Day").

In July 2007 Matt Groening said in an interview on Late Night with Conan O'Brien that the actor (Phillippe Peythieu) who does the voice of France French Homer says "T'oh!" instead of Homer's trademark "D'oh!". This comes from the actor misreading the line the first time he did Homer's voice and has been that way ever since. In the France version of the show, many other catch phrases are also translated: Bart's "Eat my shorts" becomes "Va te faire shampouiner" ("Go shampoo yourself", similar to "go to hell"). When Homer tries to throttle Bart, his phrase "Why you little..." becomes "espèce de sale petit..." (literally "you dirty lil'..."). This version also has its popular catchphrases, to translate some terms that in the original versions are not catchphrases. Thereby, instead of "Oh my god!", Homer says "Ouh pinaise!", a deformation of "Oh punaise!" (Oh darn!), a watered-down form of the expletive "Oh putain!" (Oh damn!). "Oh pinaise!" is in French as much essential to characterize Homer as "D'oh" is in English. Homer is also unable to pronounce some terms like "bibliothèque" (library) and says "bibiliothèque". These catch phrases are translated in the Canadian French version as well: "Eat my shorts" becomes "mange de la crotte" ("eat shit") while "Why you little..." becomes "mon p'tit verrat" ("you little brat").

Gérard Rinaldi, who replaced Michel Modo (who died in 2008 and who notably voiced Krusty, Chief Wiggum, Dr. Hibbert, Mr. Burns, and Principal Skinner), was himself replaced by Xavier Fagnon after his death in March 2012. Régine Teyssot voiced nearly every secondary female and child character.

In August 2025, Corus Entertainment declined to renew its rights to commission the Quebec dub for broadcast on Télétoon for season 36 onwards. Bell Media eventually reached an agreement with 20th Television parent Disney Entertainment to take over that role for broadcast on Noovo, whose predecessor TQS had previously commissioned the Quebec dub through the end of season 14, beginning in September 2026. Difuze, the dubbing studio that had most recently handled the series for Corus, continues in that capacity for Bell, using the same voice talent.

=== German ===
Die Simpsons is broadcast on ProSieben in Germany and on ORF1 in Austria. Until 1994, ZDF broadcast The Simpsons in Germany. The series was not popular on the network, with ZDF Enterprises vice-president for acquisitions Hans Jurgen Steimer believing that animation in Germany (as of 1994) was mainly aimed at kids. The main voices are dubbed by Norbert Gastell for Homer until season 26. After he died in 2015, Christoph Jablonka replaced him from season 27. Marge was dubbed by Elisabeth Volkmann. She died in 2006, Anke Engelke became her successor. The change of the voices took place in the midst of season 17, when Volkmann's last dubbed episode was "We're on the Road to D'ohwhere" and Engelke's first dubbed episode was My Fair Laddy. Whilst Elisabeth Volkmann's voice is not so close, Engelke's voice is rather "adapted" to the original voice. Bart is dubbed by Sandra Schwittau and Lisa by Sabine Bohlmann, who also dubs Maggie. One major difference is that Homer's "D'oh!" is yelled as a fierce NEIN! ("NO!"). Whenever Homer strangles Bart, he says Na warte, du Kleiner ... ("Wait you little ...") or Du mieser Kleiner ... ("You mean little ...").

=== Italian ===
I Simpson has been aired in Italy since October 1, 1991. The main voices are by Tonino Accolla (Homer), Liù Bosisio (Marge), Ilaria Stagni (Bart) and Monica Ward (Lisa). The animation of the show is changed: whenever something written in English appears on screen, the Italian version superimposes the translated phrase. In the initial blackboard scene, Bart reads the phrase translated but the blackboard itself still shows the English words. While all of the character names remain in English, some have been modified, possibly to be easier to understand and recognize as a name to the audience: most notably, Moe became Boe (and all shots of his bar's sign are graphically modified accordingly), Edna Krabappel is named Caprapall, Chief Wiggum is Commissario Winchester, Itchy and Scratchy are replaced by Grattachecca e Fichetto (the first refers to a typical granita sold in Rome. Fichetto is a person who wants to be cool but not in an exaggerated way) and Constance Harm is replaced by Grazia Negata (Pardon Denied, with Grazia being also an Italian female given name as well). All characters having roles in their name (Principal Skinner, Chief Wiggum, Groundskeeper Willie, etc.) or English words (Fat Tony) have received literal translation for their title, with Sideshow (Mel and Bob) becoming Telespalla (the word did not exist in Italian before the show, but it is a good translation since spalla is the role of a sideshow). Many characters are dubbed with strong local accents, notably Groundskeeper Willie (Giardiniere Willie, Gardener Willie) is Sardinian for instance, as Sardinia is considered to be Italy's equivalent of Scotland, stereotypically rustic. In addition, Otto Mann (Otto Disc) speaks with a Milanese accent, Carl Carlson with a Venetian, Chief Wiggum/Winchester and Lou with Neapolitan and Eddie in Barese (likely a stereotype of most police officers in Italy originating from the South), Lionel Hutz and Snake Jailbird (Serpe) with Roman, Reverend Lovejoy with Calabrese and Fat Tony with Sicilian.

In November 2012, Liù Bosisio and Ilaria Stagni, were replaced by Sonia Scotti (Marge), and Gaia Bolognesi (Bart). Like the French and Spanish version, real and fictional characters conserve their frequent Italian voice, for example in the episode "Any Given Sundance", Woody Allen (voiced by Hank Azaria), was dubbed by his Italian voice Oreste Lionello who did the last dub of his career, in fact he died a week after the Italian airing. Many characters are voiced by guest stars, like ex-minister Ignazio La Russa who voiced Garth, the sugar industries manager, politician Alessandra Mussolini as Marge's friend Tammy, football player Francesco Totti and his wife, showgirl Ilary Blasi as Buck Mitchell and Tabitha Vixx, showgirl Valeria Marini as Mindy Simmons, Maria Grazia Cucinotta as in the original version is Francesca, sideshow Bob's wife. On July 14, 2013, Tonino Accolla, the voice for Homer Simpson, died and was replaced by Massimo Lopez. In Italian, many other catch phrases are also translated: Bart's "Eat my shorts" becomes "Ciucciati il calzino" ("Suck on your sock"). When Homer tries to throttle Bart, his phrase "Why you little..." becomes "Brutto bagarospo..." ("You ugly cockroach-frog...").

=== Luxembourgish ===
The Simpsons was first broadcast in Luxembourgish in September 2011 on RTL Luxembourg, after many years of being able to watch the show in the more widely spoken French language on French TV as well as the German language on German TV. The show is titled D' Simpsons, an abbreviation for De Simpsons.

The first episode that aired was the first HD (16:9) episode called "Take My Life, Please" which is the 10th episode of season 20.

Like the French version, mentions of American culture are often omitted, such as TV shows not known internationally, while the episodes appear uncut and broadcast in full with the end credits intact. The start sequence sees an onscreen subtitle for the chalkboard gags.

This version came about after many fans in Luxembourg protested for such a version, although the movie is only available in French and German at present (two of the three official languages of the country). RTL's screening of the show is sponsored by Luxembourg Post.

=== Russian ===
Симпсоны was first broadcast in Russian in 1997 on local network REN TV and, eventually, its air coverage reached almost all of the former USSR, including the Baltics. The show's voiceovers were done by married couple Boris Bystrov and Irina Savina from season 9 onward (with some gaps), including The Simpsons Movie. In 2007, in line with changes to the channel's brand, Симпсоны switched from REN TV to 2×2, a Russian analog of Adult Swim, where they perform nowadays.

Although the show was heavily criticized for its "amorality", the broadcast was never halted and little censorship occurred, beyond blurring alcohol and cigarettes due to local law. A more serious case of censorship occurred in Looking for Mr. Goodbart, where the scene with Homer playing Peekimon Get in church was cut due to similarities with the ongoing scandal in which a local blogger who had done the same thing in real life was jailed.

The translation is direct and the references to American pop-culture remain untouched, making jokes harder to understand for Russian viewers. However, if possible, translators try to russify puns. "D'oh!" is usually "Чёрт!" (Damn!), "Ой!" (Oh!) or remains untouched.

=== Spanish ===
The Simpsons is dubbed into the Spanish language in two versions, one for Spain, and another in Mexico targeted to all Spanish-speaking countries in the Americas. In both versions, the show is named Los Simpson, as last names are pluralized in Spanish using the article rather than the -s suffix (although it is commonly misspelled as "Los Simpsons").

There are many differences between the two versions, as there are differences between the Spanish spoken in Spain and in Hispanic America. Whereas the dubbing in Spain tends to be more literal and to not translate character names nor toponyms, in the Hispanic American version many of the character names are translated, sometimes freely. Thus, in Hispanic America Homer is translated as Homero Simpson. Other translations in Hispanic America are: Barney Gumble as Barney Gómez, Chief Wiggum as Jefe Gorgory, Ralph Wiggum as Ralf/Rafa Gorgory, Reverend Lovejoy as Reverendo Alegría and Mayor "Diamond" Joe Quimby as Alcalde Diamante. Itchy and Scratchy are translated in the two versions: Tomy y Daly for Hispanic America, and Rasca y Pica for Spain (however, "Pica" and "Rasca" literally translate as "It itches" and "It scratches"). Sideshow Bob is Bob Patiño in Hispanic America, and Actor secundario Bob in Spain. The region 1 DVDs include the Hispanic American audio.

==== Latin America ====
The Simpsons was first dubbed in Mexico in 1990. The first dubbing studio selected was Audiomaster 3000; in Mexico City. In the list of voice actors chosen was Humberto Vélez, a recognized voice actor; besides dubbing Homer Simpson, Vélez was the narrator and translator in the series. The series was adapted to including words and expressions not only Mexican, but of the Americas; such as Chile, Argentina, among others. In January 2005, the National Association of Actors opposed a proposal from Grabaciones y Doblajes Internationales (later New Art Dub), the dubbing studio responsible for producing the Hispanic American version, to allow hiring of non-trade actors. That April, Vélez announced his departure from The Simpsons. In July, from the sixteenth season onwards, almost the entire cast was permanently replaced with new actors, who also were unable to dub The Simpsons Movie. This change was not very well received by the fans.

Nancy MacKenzie voiced Marge Simpson for the first fifteen seasons. Other voices are Patricia Acevedo (Lisa) and Claudia Motta (Bart).

Vélez said that it was hard to him to left the show, because Homer has always been and still is his favorite character.

In 2021, after the Disney purchase, the original voice cast returned to The Simpsons, including Humberto Vélez (Homer), Claudia Motta (Bart and Marge), Patricia Acevedo (Lisa) and Gabriel Chávez (Mr. Burns). They returned to voice the characters in the short The Good, the Bart, and the Loki, available on Disney+, and season 32. The comeback was praised by the critics and fans.

In the Mexican version, it is common to hear local jokes or expressions, as well as references to Latin American pop-culture. For the Hispanic American version; the local jokes, expressions and words were deleted after the actors' strike, becoming more neutral. Since 2021, the local jokes are used again, such as the words chulada, pequeño demonio and anda la osa.

==== Spain ====
The Spanish voice acting is performed in standard Castilian accent. The show is translated to the standard Spanish dialect, accounting for some differences in vocabulary from its Hispanic American counterpart. Regional accents, as would be present in the original English cast (e.g., Willie's Scottish accent) are also dubbed into the standard Castilian accent so as to avoid representing specific Spanish regional accents with the stereotypes associated in English to characters of that accent. Several fans of the series and the rest of the Spanish cast were devastated after the death of Carlos Revilla due to his fame as Homer Simpson, and Antena 3 had to find a substitute for Revilla's voice (as opposed to Dan Castellaneta's). Finally, Carlos Ysbert, a popular voice actor who had been a supporting actor on the Revilla's team, now voices Homer.

Revilla also dubbed the appearance of KITT in the episode "The Wizard of Evergreen Terrace", like he did in Knight Rider. There are other characters that conserve their frequent voice in Spain: like Mulder and Scully from The X-Files, or Sideshow Bob and his brother Cecil. They are dubbed by the same actors who dub Kelsey Grammer and David Hyde Pierce in Frasier. (With Cecil this only occurs in his first appearance.) In the Spanish version of The Simpsons Movie, the Tom Hanks cameo was dubbing by his habitual voice in Spain, Jordi Brau. In European Spanish, the rest of the family characters are played by Margarita de Francia (Marge), Isacha Mengíbar (Lisa) and Sara Vivas (Bart). Vivas also directs the dubbing of the series nowadays.

The Spanish version of The Simpsons also distinguishes itself by using more literal translations of what the characters are saying. Jokes and pop cultural references from the original English version are generally maintained, although it is also known for including Spanish pop cultural references and creating its own jokes. In 2000, the Spaniard version was awarded the Best Simpsons Dub in Europe by FOX.

=== Portuguese ===
==== Brazil ====
In Brazil, The Simpsons is dubbed into Brazilian Portuguese by Audio News studio in Rio de Janeiro. The voice for Homer/Abe is Carlos Alberto, Marge is Selma Lopes, Lisa is voiced by Nair Amorim and later by Flavia Saddy and Bart is voiced by Rodrigo Antas. Some of the name of the characters is adapted to a similar name in Brazilian Portuguese or translated, when there are words or names in the Brazilian Portuguese language. For an example the character Gill, his name is pronounced Jil, like the singer Gilberto Gil, for translations: Snowball is called Bola de Neve, and Santa's Little Helper is called Ajudante do Papai Noel. Kwik E 'Mart, the first season is Mercadinho. Homer's friend, Lenny has an accent from the Brazilian northeast.

==== Portugal ====
Unlike Brazil, in Portugal, the show airs in its original English with Portuguese subtitles, as seen on TV. However, The Simpsons Movie was both dubbed and subtitled in Portuguese theaters.

== By country ==
=== Belgium ===
In Belgium, The Simpsons have two different airings. One for the Flanders region where it remains in its original English with Dutch subtitles on RTL 4, then TVTWEE, then VIER, then 2BE since 2012, and one for the Wallonia-Brussels region where they air the French dub from France, first on Canal+ Belgium, then RTL-TVI, then Club RTL from 1995 to 2016, then Plug RTL in late 2016, then Tipik from 2020 to early 2023, and Plug RTL again in 2023. Seasons 24 to 26 of the French dub were broadcast in Belgium before France.

On 24 October 2009, VT4 broadcast a one-off dubbed episode of the series dubbed in Flemish Dutch (the series was regularly broadcast in English with Dutch subtitles), Sex, Pies and Idiot Scrapes, under the title De Vlaamse Simpsons (The Flemish Simpsons) as part of the 20th anniversary of the series. For the dub, the same voice actors from the movie reprised their roles.

The series in Walloonia moved from Club RTL to Plug RTL on 1 February 2016, as it attracted low ratings (2% share). At the time of the decision, RTL Belgium was negotiating the airing of around 150 old episodes per year.

=== China ===
In 2006, The Simpsons, along with other shows such as Pokémon, SpongeBob SquarePants and Mickey Mouse cartoons, were banned from being aired during primetime (5:00 to 8:00 PM) in China. This was done so that Chinese cartoons, which were having a hard time competing with foreign cartoons, would gain more viewers. The government had previously tried several things, such as ordering that networks cut down on the number of foreign animated series being aired in 2000 and in 2004, passed a rule that would ensure that 60 percent of cartoon content came from Chinese studios. The move was heavily criticized by Chinese media. The Simpsons Movie, however, has been dubbed into Mandarin Chinese and Cantonese. The show currently airs in Mandarin with some edits. Episodes are typically broadcast 2–3 weeks after its original airdate in the US.

=== Hungary ===
The Simpsons appeared for the first time in Hungary, and it was dubbed into the Hungarian language on TV3 on September 14, 1998. The series was one of the most popular shows on TV3, but this channel closed down on February 21, 2000. As a result, Viasat 3 started to broadcast new episodes starting with season 6 from September 29, 2001. In January 2008, Viasat 3 was ceased to broadcast The Simpsons, and its sister channel, Viasat 6 (then TV6) started to air reruns. In September 2008, Viasat 6 also started to air new episodes. On August 30, 2013, Viasat 6 broadcast the season finale of season 24. On February 4, 2014, the Hungarian version of Fox launched, and from season 25, Fox broadcasts new episodes of The Simpsons in Hungary on Fridays. Currently the episodes are available in Hungarian after two weeks from its original broadcast in the US.

=== India ===
The Simpsons (द सिम्पसन्स) has aired on Fox India and FX India, in English and dubbed into the Hindi language. Chetan Shashital provides the voice for Homer Simpson in the Hindi dub of the TV series, while during talks of a Hindi dub of The Simpsons Movie, the producers of the planned Hindi dub wanted to choose Boman Irani to voice Homer instead, but that project never came through. It also airs in English and Punjabi.

=== Japan ===
In Japan, The Simpsons has been dubbed into Japanese and was first broadcast by WOWOW from September 19, 1992, until 2002 (seasons 1-12), and later on the Fox Channel (seasons 13 and 14) until 2007. The show is broadcast on Fox Sports and Entertainment in English with Japanese subtitles from 2008 (season 15 -) onwards. However, seasons 15 - 17 were dubbed for Disney+ in 2022.

=== Netherlands ===
In the Netherlands, The Simpsons airs in its original English with Dutch subtitles on Comedy Central. The Simpsons Movie did receive a Dutch dub.

=== Pakistan ===
The Simpsons was dubbed for the first time in Punjabi and aired on Geo TV in Pakistan. The name of the localised Punjabi version is Tedi Sim Sim (Punjabi: ٹڈی سم سم). All references to drugs, drinking and sex have been removed. It is one of the most popular shows that airs on Geo TV. The original English version also airs but on STAR World. Both of the versions are quite popular.

=== South Africa ===
In South Africa, all networks air the show in English. This is due to the fact that there are no Afrikaans or native language dubs of the show and that most people would view it in English anyway. The series first aired on Bop TV, the television station of the former state of Bophuthatswana, in 1990, before being picked up by M-Net nationwide shortly after.

=== South Korea ===
The show arrived to South Korea on January 9, 1995, on MBC and the second season on July 1, 1995. Homer was dubbed by Han Song-Pae. Due to disparate cultural differences, MBC pulled the show from their schedule. In 2002, EBS and Tooniverse acquired the show with individual dubs for each channel. However, the show stopped being aired in South Korea after Season 28. Currently, the series is available to stream in South Korea on Disney+.

=== Sweden ===
The Simpsons appeared for the first time on Swedish television on November 29, 1990. The series was originally broadcast on TV3 in English with Swedish subtitles. However, in 1993, the network decided to start dubbing The Simpsons into Swedish to increase ratings, and the show was moved to a more child-friendly time. After a public outrage the dubbing was dropped after only six episodes and the show was moved to a more adult time. Bart was voiced by Annica Smedius and Homer by Per Sandborgh. A dub of the movie was released with The Simpsons Movie DVD, with Annica Smedius providing the voice for Bart once again.

== List of languages ==
- Arabic
- Brazilian Portuguese
- Canadian French
- Catalan
- Czech
- Danish
- Dutch
- English
- European French
- European Portuguese
- European Spanish
- Finnish
- German
- Greek
- Hebrew
- Hindi
- Hungarian
- Icelandic
- Indonesian
- Italian
- Japanese
- Korean
- Latin American Spanish
- Luxembourgish
- Lithuanian
- Mandarin Chinese
- Norwegian
- Polish
- Punjabi
- Romanian
- Russian
- Swedish
- Thai
- Turkish
- Ukrainian
- Vietnamese
