= Tonino Accolla =

Italian voice actor (1949–2013)

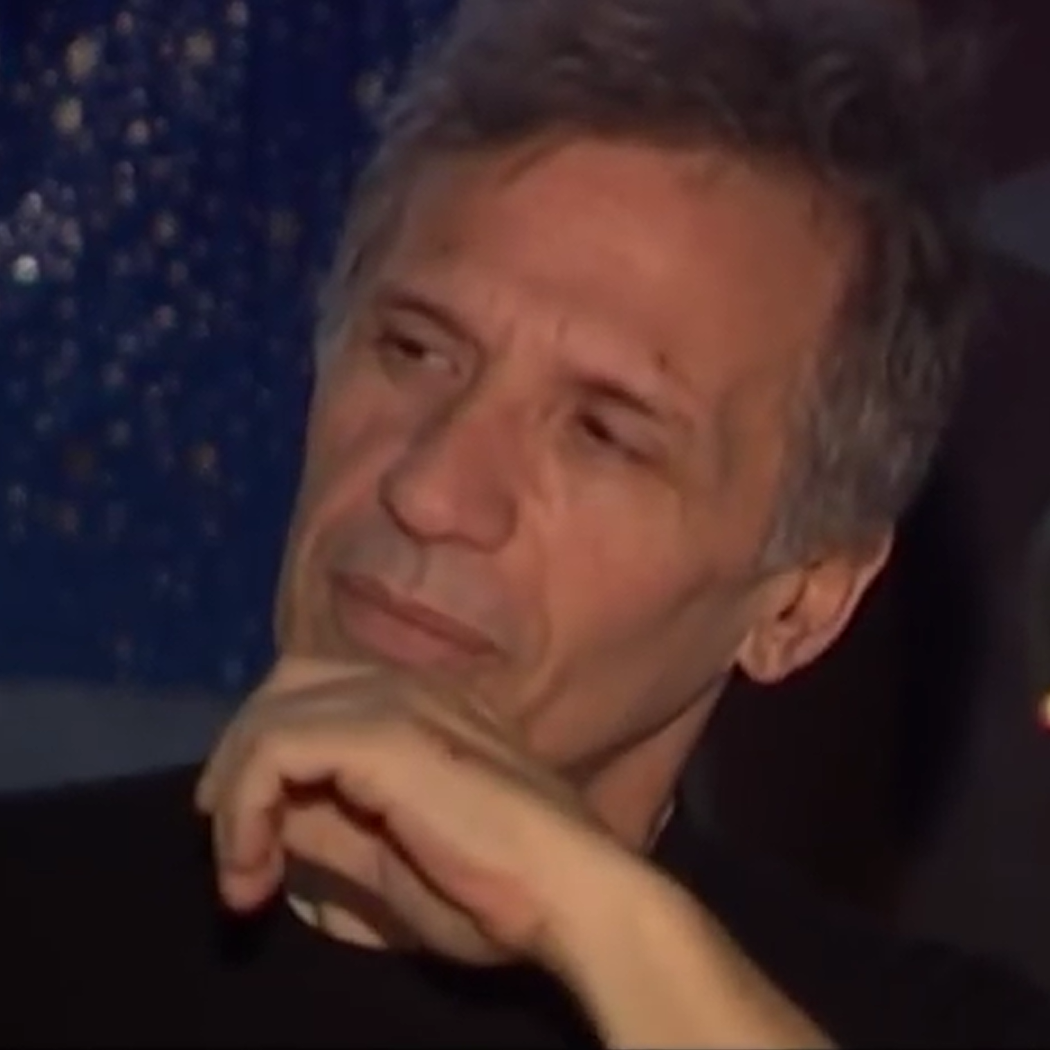
- Accolla in 2006
- Born: Antonino Accolla; 6 July 1949; Syracuse, Italy
- Died: 14 July 2013 (aged 64); Rome, Italy
- Occupations: Actor; voice actor; dubbing director
- Years active: 1973–2013
- Children: Lorenzo Accolla
- Relatives: Natalia Accolla (niece) Francesco Accolla (brother)

Antonino "Tonino" Accolla (6 july 1949 – 14 July 2013) was an Italian actor, voice actor and dubbing director. He was a well-known voice dubber, with the public mainly identifying him as the Italian voice of actor Eddie Murphy and Homer Simpson in The Simpsons. He also served as the Italian voice of Timon in The Lion King, and Mike Wazowski in Monsters, Inc..

He also directed the dubs for several episodes of The Simpsons as well as films such as The Silence of the Lambs, Speed, True Lies, Romeo + Juliet, Independence Day, Titanic, Legally Blonde, The Devil Wears Prada, Borat, V for Vendetta, Hairspray, The Simpsons Movie, and Avatar.

== Biography ==
Accolla was born in Syracuse, Italy. He began his career in the early 1970s acting in theatre, film and radio shows, making one of his earliest prominent dubbing contributions in the 1979 film Apocalypse Now. Accolla was notable for providing the Italian voice of Eddie Murphy in all his live-action roles until 2009. Other actors he dubbed over were Kenneth Branagh, Tom Hanks, Mickey Rourke, Ralph Fiennes, Jim Carrey, Ben Stiller, O. J. Simpson, Bill Paxton, Gary Oldman, Christopher Lambert and Billy Crystal in a select number of their films.

In Accolla’s animated roles, he was best known for providing the voice of the animated character Homer Simpson in the Italian version of The Simpsons until his death in 2013. He also served as the Italian voice of Timon in the animated film The Lion King, Mike Wazowski in Monsters, Inc. and Mushu in Mulan II and House of Mouse.

As a dubbing director, Accolla directed 194 dubs, and wrote dialogue for 165 dubs. The dubs he directed and wrote included several episodes of The Simpsons, as well as films such as The Silence of the Lambs, Speed, True Lies, Braveheart, Strange Days, Romeo + Juliet, Independence Day, Titanic, Legally Blonde, The Devil Wears Prada, Borat, V for Vendetta, Hairspray, The Simpsons Movie, and Avatar. In 1991, he received the Nastro d'Argento for Best Dubbing for his dubbing of Kenneth Branagh in the film Henry V.

=== Personal life ===
Accolla was the father of voice actor Lorenzo Accolla and the uncle of voice actress Natalia Accolla. He was the brother of composer Francesco Accolla.

== Death ==
Accolla died on 14 July 2013, aged 64, after suffering a long illness. The role of Homer Simpson was passed on to voice actor and comedian Massimo Lopez.

== Filmography ==
=== Cinema ===
Year	Title	Role	Notes
1974	L'eredità dello zio buonanima	Franco’s son	
2003	Opopomoz	Astarotte (voice)	Animated film
2007	Hidden Love	Gentleman caller	
2008	Sandrine in the Rain		Cameo

=== Television ===
Year	Title	Role	Notes
1973	Napoleone a Sant'Elena	Lucien Bonaparte	TV miniseries
1973	La famiglia Barrett	Settimo Barrett	TV play
1974	Sotto il placido Don	Mombelli	TV miniseries
1975	Tommaso d'Aquino	Aimone	TV film
1977	Lo scandalo della Banca Romana	Alberto Lanti	TV miniseries
1977	Giovanni Episcopo	Young man	TV play
1979	Tre ore dopo le nozze	Actor	TV play
1979	Antonio e Cleopatra	Eros	TV play
1979	La grande rabbia di Philipp Hotz	Porter	TV play
1982	Le tre capitali	Muratorello	TV film
1989	Tornerai		TV miniseries
1991	Tiramolla Adventures	Tiramolla (voice)	Animated series
2001	Il maresciallo Rocca	Mai	2 episodes (season 3)

=== Dubbing ===
==== Films (Animation, Italian dub) ====
Year	Title	Role(s)	Ref
1979	The Castle of Cagliostro	Goemon Ishikawa XIII	
1981	Swan Lake	Prince Siegfried	
1986	The Great Mouse Detective	Citizen	
1994	The Lion King	Timon	
1994	Asterix Conquers America	Asterix	
2001	Mickey's Magical Christmas: Snowed in at the House of Mouse	Mushu	
2001	Monsters, Inc.	Mike Wazowski	
2002	Mike's New Car	Mike Wazowski	
2004	Mulan II	Mushu	
2004	The Lion King 1½	Timon	
2006	Asterix and the Vikings	Cacofonix	
2006	Asterix and the Vikings	Narrator	
2006	Cars	Mike Car	
2006	Shark Bait	Pierre	
2007	The Simpsons Movie	Homer Simpson	
2007	The Simpsons Movie	Fat Tony	
2007	Noah's Ark	King Sabu	
2009	Lilly the Witch: The Dragon and the Magic Book	Hector	

==== Films (Live action, Italian dub) ====
Year	Title	Role(s)	Original actor	Ref
1975	The Apple Dumpling Gang	Russell Donovan	Bill Bixby	
1979	Alien	Gilbert Kane (Director’s cut)	John Hurt	
1979	Apocalypse Now	Kilgore's Gunner	James Keane	
1979	More American Graffiti	Lance Harris	John Lansing	
1980	The Watcher in the Woods	Paul Curtis	David McCallum	
1980	Fame	Montgomery MacNeil	Paul McCrane	
1981	Taps	Alex Dwyer	Sean Penn	
1981	Endless Love	Keith Butterfield	James Spader	
1982	48 Hrs.	Reggie Hammond	Eddie Murphy	
1982	The Thing	Windows	Thomas G. Waites	
1983	Trading Places	Billy Ray Valentine	Eddie Murphy	
1983	Something Wicked This Way Comes	Mr. Dark	Jonathan Pryce	
1983	Monty Python's The Meaning of Life	Various roles	Eric Idle	
1983	Terms of Endearment	Flap Horton	Jeff Daniels	
1983	Flashdance	Richie Blazek	Kyle T. Heffner	
1983	Risky Business	Joel Goodsen	Tom Cruise	
1984	Red Dawn	Jed Eckert	Patrick Swayze	
1984	Reckless	Johnny Rourke	Aidan Quinn	
1984	The Pope of Greenwich Village	Charlie Moran	Mickey Rourke	
1984	Cinderella '80	Mizio / Prince Eugenio	Pierre Cosso	
1984	Beverly Hills Cop	Axel Foley	Eddie Murphy	
1984	Best Defense	T.M. Landry	Eddie Murphy	
1984	Harry & Son	Howard Keach	Robby Benson	
1984	Splash	Allen Bauer	Tom Hanks	
1984	Dune	Paul Atreides	Kyle MacLachlan	
1985	Clue	Wadsworth	Tim Curry	
1985	Cocoon	Jack Bonner	Steve Guttenberg	
1985	The Breakfast Club	John Bender	Judd Nelson	
1986	9½ Weeks	John Gray	Mickey Rourke	
1986	Power	Arnold Billings	Denzel Washington	
1986	The Golden Child	Chandler Jarrell	Eddie Murphy	
1986	Heartburn	Richard	Jeff Daniels	
1986	Every Time We Say Goodbye	David Bradley	Tom Hanks	
1986	The Money Pit	Walter Fielding	Tom Hanks	
1986	Pretty in Pink	Steff McKee	James Spader	
1986	Ferris Bueller's Day Off	Garth Volbeck	Charlie Sheen	
1986	The Venetian Woman	Jules	Jason Connery	
1987	Beverly Hills Cop II	Axel Foley	Eddie Murphy	
1987	Eddie Murphy Raw	Eddie Murphy	Eddie Murphy	
1987	Angel Heart	Harry Angel	Mickey Rourke	
1987	A Prayer for the Dying	Martin Fallon	Mickey Rourke	
1987	The Gold Rimmed Glasses	Davide Lattes	Rupert Everett	
1987	Bad Taste	Derek	Peter Jackson	
1987	Bad Taste	Robert	Peter Jackson	
1987	Dragnet	Pep Streebek	Tom Hanks	
1987	The Sicilian	Salvatore Giuliano	Christopher Lambert	
1987	Planes, Trains and Automobiles	Owen Mooney	Dylan Baker	
1987	Three Men and a Baby	Michael Kellam	Steve Guttenberg	
1988	The Naked Gun: From the Files of Police Squad!	Detective Nordberg	O. J. Simpson	
1988	Coming to America	Prince Akeem Joffer	Eddie Murphy	
1988	Coming to America	Randy Watson	Eddie Murphy	
1988	Coming to America	Saul	Eddie Murphy	
1988	Coming to America	Clarence	Eddie Murphy	
1988	Bye Bye Baby	Marcello	Jason Connery	
1988	Working Girl	Bob Speck	Kevin Spacey	
1989	Turner & Hooch	Scott Turner	Tom Hanks	
1989	Major League	Willie Mays Hayes	Wesley Snipes	
1989	Parenthood	Nathan Huffner	Rick Moranis	
1989	Harlem Nights	Vernest "Quick" Brown	Eddie Murphy	
1989	When Harry Met Sally...	Harry Burns	Billy Crystal	
1989	Wild Orchid	James Wheeler	Mickey Rourke	
1989	Miss Firecracker	Delmount Williams	Tim Robbins	
1989	Henry V	King Henry V	Kenneth Branagh	
1989	The Fabulous Baker Boys	Frank Baker	Beau Bridges	
1990	Pacific Heights	Carter Hayes / James Danforth	Michael Keaton	
1990	Another 48 Hrs.	Reggie Hammond	Eddie Murphy	
1990	The Exorcist III	James Venamun / The Gemini Killer	Brad Dourif	
1990	Joe Versus the Volcano	Joe Banks	Tom Hanks	
1990	Desperate Hours	Michael Bosworth	Mickey Rourke	
1990	Bad Influence	Alex	Rob Lowe	
1990	Come See the Paradise	Jack McGurn	Dennis Quaid	
1990	Blue Steel	Eugene Hunt	Ron Silver	
1991	Dead Again	Mike Church	Kenneth Branagh	
1991	Dead Again	Roman Strauss	Kenneth Branagh	
1991	City Slickers	Mitch Robbins	Billy Crystal	
1991	Teenage Mutant Ninja Turtles II: The Secret of the Ooze	Leonardo	Brian Tochi	
1991	Grand Canyon	Mack	Kevin Kline	
1991	The Naked Gun 2½: The Smell of Fear	Detective Nordberg	O. J. Simpson	
1992	Peter's Friends	Andrew Benson	Kenneth Branagh	
1992	The Player	Larry Levy	Peter Gallagher	
1992	The Distinguished Gentleman	Thomas Jefferson Johnson	Eddie Murphy	
1992	Boomerang	Marcus Graham	Eddie Murphy	
1992	Christopher Columbus: The Discovery	Alvaro Harana	Benicio del Toro	
1992	White Men Can't Jump	Sidney "Syd" Deane	Wesley Snipes	
1992	Mr. Saturday Night	Buddy Young Jr.	Billy Crystal	
1992	Max and Jérémie	Jérémie Kolachowsky	Christopher Lambert	
1992	Wayne's World	Benjamin Kane	Rob Lowe	
1992	Brain Donors	Roland T. Flakfizer	John Turturro	
1992	1492: Conquest of Paradise	Arojaz	Kario Salem	
1992	Alien 3	Robert Morse	Danny Webb	
1993	Loaded Weapon 1	Mr. Jigsaw	Tim Curry	
1993	Much Ado About Nothing	Benedick	Kenneth Branagh	
1993	Sister Act 2: Back in the Habit	Father Wolfgang	Thomas Gottschalk	
1993	Teenage Mutant Ninja Turtles III	Leonardo	Brian Tochi	
1993	Mrs. Doubtfire	Stuart Dunmeyer	Pierce Brosnan	
1993	Hot Shots! Part Deux	Dexter Hayman	Rowan Atkinson	
1994	Beverly Hills Cop III	Axel Foley	Eddie Murphy	
1994	Ace Ventura: Pet Detective	Ace Ventura	Jim Carrey	
1994	True Lies	Simon	Bill Paxton	
1994	Three Colours: Red	Michel	Marc Autheman	
1994	Naked Gun 33 1/3: The Final Insult	Detective Nordberg	O. J. Simpson	
1994	Trapped in Paradise	Bill Firpo	Nicolas Cage	
1994	Highlander III: The Sorcerer	Connor MacLeod	Christopher Lambert	
1994	Drop Zone	Pete Nessip	Wesley Snipes	
1994	Léon: The Professional	Norman Stansfield	Gary Oldman	
1994	Speed	Maurice	Glenn Plummer	
1994	Speed	Cameraman	Todd Gordon	
1994	Angie	Noel	Stephen Rea	
1994	Prêt-à-Porter	Milo O'Brannigan	Stephen Rea	
1994	Bullets Over Broadway	David Shayne	John Cusack	
1994	Little Indian, Big City	Stéphane Marchadot	Thierry Lhermitte	
1994	Bad Girls	Josh McCoy	Dermot Mulroney	
1995	Strange Days	Lenny Nero	Ralph Fiennes	
1995	Nine Months	Samuel Faulkner	Hugh Grant	
1995	Vampire in Brooklyn	Maximillian	Eddie Murphy	
1995	Vampire in Brooklyn	Preacher Pauly	Eddie Murphy	
1995	Vampire in Brooklyn	Guido	Eddie Murphy	
1995	Ace Ventura: When Nature Calls	Ace Ventura	Jim Carrey	
1995	Kiss of Death	Junior "Little Junior" Brown	Nicolas Cage	
1995	Braveheart	Robert the Bruce	Angus Macfadyen	
1996	Romeo + Juliet	Mercutio	Harold Perrineau	
1996	That Thing You Do!	Amos White	Tom Hanks	
1996	Looking for Richard	Kenneth Branagh	Kenneth Branagh	
1996	The Evening Star	Jerry Bruckner	Bill Paxton	
1996	The Nutty Professor	Sherman Klump	Eddie Murphy	
1996	The Nutty Professor	Buddy Love	Eddie Murphy	
1996	The Nutty Professor	Cletus Klump	Eddie Murphy	
1996	The Nutty Professor	Anna Pearl Jensen-Klump	Eddie Murphy	
1996	The Nutty Professor	Ida Mae Jensen	Eddie Murphy	
1996	The Nutty Professor	Ernie Klump Sr.	Eddie Murphy	
1996	The Nutty Professor	Lance Perkins	Eddie Murphy	
1996	Crash	James Ballard	James Spader	
1996	Down Periscope	Stanley "Spots" Sylvesterson	Jonathan Penner	
1996	Dunston Checks In	Lord Rutledge	Rupert Everett	
1996	Independence Day	President Thomas J. Whitmore	Bill Pullman	
1996	Brain Donors	Roland T. Flakfizer	John Turturro	
1996	The Crucible	John Hale	Rob Campbell	
1997	Oscar and Lucinda	Oscar Hopkins	Ralph Fiennes	
1997	Metro	Scott Roper	Eddie Murphy	
1997	The Fifth Element	Jean-Baptiste Emanuel Zorg	Gary Oldman	
1997	'Til There Was You	Nick Dawkan	Dylan McDermott	
1997	Traveller	Bokky	Bill Paxton	
1997	Titanic	Brock Lovett	Bill Paxton	
1997	Alien Resurrection	Larry Purvis	Leland Orser	
1997	Speed 2: Cruise Control	Alex Shaw	Jason Patric	
1998	Simon Birch	Joe Wenteworth (adult)	Jim Carrey	
1998	The Thin Red Line	John Gaff	John Cusack	
1998	The Red Violin	Frederick Pope	Jason Flemyng	
1998	Holy Man	G	Eddie Murphy	
1998	Dr. Dolittle	Dr. John Dolittle	Eddie Murphy	
1998	Dr. Dolittle	Goat	Phyllis Katz	
1998	There's Something About Mary	Ted Stroehmann	Ben Stiller	
1998	Gunslinger's Revenge	Jack Sikora	David Bowie	
1998	Practical Magic	Jimmy Angelov	Goran Višnjić	
1998	Coppia omicida	Domenico	Thomas Kretschmann	
1999	Life	Rayford "Ray" Gibson	Eddie Murphy	
1999	Bowfinger	Kit Ramsey	Eddie Murphy	
1999	Bowfinger	Jiff Ramsey	Eddie Murphy	
2000	Nutty Professor II: The Klumps	Sherman Klump	Eddie Murphy	
2000	Nutty Professor II: The Klumps	Buddy Love	Eddie Murphy	
2000	Nutty Professor II: The Klumps	Cletus Klump	Eddie Murphy	
2000	Nutty Professor II: The Klumps	Anna Pearl Jensen-Klump	Eddie Murphy	
2000	Nutty Professor II: The Klumps	Ida Mae Jensen	Eddie Murphy	
2000	Nutty Professor II: The Klumps	Ernie Klump Sr.	Eddie Murphy	
2000	Nutty Professor II: The Klumps	Lance Perkins	Eddie Murphy	
2000	Get Carter	Cyrus Paice	Mickey Rourke	
2000	The Cell	Carl Rudolph Stargher	Vincent D'Onofrio	
2000	Me, Myself & Irene	Charlie Baileygates	Jim Carrey	
2000	Me, Myself & Irene	Hank Evans	Jim Carrey	
2000	Little Nicky	Nicky	Adam Sandler	
2000	Rules of Engagement	Mark Biggs	Guy Pearce	
2000	Lost Souls	Henry Birdson	John Diehl	
2001	Dr. Dolittle 2	Dr. John Dolittle	Eddie Murphy	
2001	One Night at McCool's	Carl	Paul Reiser	
2001	Jay and Silent Bob Strike Back	Pumpkin Escobar	Tracy Morgan	
2001	Planet of the Apes	General Thade	Tim Roth	
2001	Human Nature	Puff	Rhys Ifans	
2002	Showtime	Trey Sellars	Eddie Murphy	
2002	The Adventures of Pluto Nash	Pluto Nash	Eddie Murphy	
2002	The Adventures of Pluto Nash	Rex Crater	Eddie Murphy	
2002	I Spy	Kelly Robinson	Eddie Murphy	
2002	Spider	Dennis "Spider" Cleg	Ralph Fiennes	
2003	Bruce Almighty	Bruce Nolan	Jim Carrey	
2003	Daddy Day Care	Charlie Hinton	Eddie Murphy	
2003	The Haunted Mansion	Jim Evers	Eddie Murphy	
2003	Ghosts of the Abyss	Bill Paxton	Bill Paxton	
2003	The Last Samurai	Colonel Bagley	Tony Goldwyn	
2004	Dodgeball: A True Underdog Story	White Goodman	Ben Stiller	
2004	The Machinist	Trevor Reznik	Christian Bale	
2005	Mr. & Mrs. Smith	Marco Racin	Elijah Alexander	
2006	Dreamgirls	James "Thunder" Early	Eddie Murphy	
2006	Dr. Dolittle 3	Cogburn the Rooster	Paulo Costanzo	
2006	The Pink Panther	Nigel Boswell	Clive Owen	
2007	Norbit	Norbit Albert Rice	Eddie Murphy	
2007	Norbit	Rasputia Latimore	Eddie Murphy	
2007	Norbit	Mr. Wong	Eddie Murphy	
2007	Virgin Territory	Gerbino Della Ratta	Tim Roth	
2007	Epic Movie	Harry Beaver	Katt Williams	
2008	Meet Dave	Dave Ming Chang	Eddie Murphy	
2008	Meet Dave	The Captain (Number 1)	Eddie Murphy	
2009	Imagine That	Evan Danielson	Eddie Murphy	

==== Television (Animation, Italian dub) ====
Year	Title	Role(s)	Notes	Ref
1979	Machine Hayabusa	Ryu	Recurring role	
1981–1982	The Smurfs	Papa Smurf	Main cast (3rd voice)	
1982	Isabelle of Paris	Andrea	Main cast	
1991–2013	The Simpsons	Homer Simpson	Main cast (seasons 1–23)	
1991–2013	The Simpsons	Grampa Simpson (young)	Main cast (seasons 1–23)	
1991–2013	The Simpsons	Various characters	Main cast (seasons 1–23)	
1996–2000	Ace Ventura: Pet Detective	Ace Ventura	Main cast	
2001–2002	House of Mouse	Mushu	9 episodes	

==== Television (Live action, Italian dub) ====
Year	Title	Role(s)	Notes	Original actor	Ref
1979–1987	M*A*S*H	Maxwell Q. Klinger	Recurring role	Jamie Farr	
1982	Oliver Twist	Bill Sikes	TV film	Tim Curry	
1982	Marco Polo	Prince Chinkin	TV miniseries	Junichi Ishida	
1982–1987	Happy Days	Roger Phillips	Recurring role	Ted McGinley	
1983–1989	Simon & Simon	A.J. Simon	Main cast	Jameson Parker	
1984	Mistral's Daughter	Eric Avigdor	TV miniseries	Pierre Malet	
1985	North and South	Orry Main	TV miniseries	Patrick Swayze	
1985	Baila Comigo	Joaquim Seixas Miranda	Main cast	Tony Ramos	
1990	A Season of Giants	Michelangelo	TV miniseries	Mark Frankel	
1991	Young Catherine	Count Grigory Orlov	TV miniseries	Mark Frankel	
1998–2003	Mad About You	Paul Buchman	Main cast (seasons 1–6)	Paul Reiser	

==== Video games (Italian dub) ====
Year	Title	Role(s)	Ref
2007	The Simpsons Game	Homer Simpson	
