= Opopomoz =

2003 Italian-French-Spanish film

- Film poster
- Directed by: Enzo D'Alò
- Written by: Furio Scarpelli; Enzo D'Alò; Giacomo Scarpelli
- Produced by: Luigi Musini; Vittorio Cecchi Gori
- Starring: John Turturro; Fabio Volo; Silvio Orlando; Tonino Accolla; Oreste Lionello; Vincenzo Salemme
- Music by: Pino Daniele
- Production companies: Albachiara; Rai Cinema; DeAPlaneta
- Distributed by: Mikado Film
- Release date: 5 December 2003
- Running time: 80 min
- Country: Italy
- Language: Italian

Opopomoz is a 2003 Italian animated Christmas film directed by Enzo D'Alò. It tells an unusual Christmas story, set in a modern-day Naples, during the Christmas season.

The film was shot in two years, with a budget of about 10 million euro.

== Plot ==
The movie starts in Hell where Satan plans to destroy Christmas by stopping Jesus's birth, and he decides to send three of his minions — Astarotte, Scarapino and Farfaricchio — in Naples from the barrel of Mount Vesuvius since it was the "Crib's capital". The three devils choose a little kid called Rocco, which is unhappy and jealous for the incoming birth of his little brother Francesco, and he's always angry with his mother and father.

After a lot of tempting, the devils manage to make Rocco say the magic word "Opopomoz" and go into the crib's world, where he's determined to stop Mary and Joseph from coming to Betlem. But the three devils cause a lot of problems and never manage to accomplish the mission, so Rocco runs away.

Meanwhile, his little Italo-American cousin Sara discovers what happened thanks to Rocco's cat and runs after him into the Crib's world, but doesn't manage to find, and she's found by a young Saint Peter and his family. Rocco finally finds Sara who finally convinces him, with the help of an Angel, that he was wrong, so they send away the three devils.

Satan's furious with them and decides to kill Mary by hypnotizing Rocco and devouring Sara's soul, but his spell fails after the boy looked at Mary's aureole and the three devils, who are tired of getting bossed and feel sorry for the little girl, wake her and encourage her to sing a song her grandmother taught her which could send away the devil, and so Satan is sucked back in Hell forever.

Finally, Jesus is born and Rocco's mother gives birth to Francesco right on Christmas's night and the three little devils are turned into an ox and two donkeys to watch over little Jesus.

== Voice Cast ==
- Tonino Accolla as Astarotte
- Oreste Lionello as Scarapino
- Fabio Volo as Farfaricchio
- John Turturro as John
- Silvio Orlando as Peppino
- Vincenzo Salemme as Joseph

== See also ==
- List of Christmas films
