= Margarita de Francia =

Spanish voice actress

Margarita de Francia is a Spanish voice actress best known as the voice of Marge Simpson in the Spanish version of The Simpsons.

Born in Soria, Castile and León, De Francia was cast by Antena 3 as the voice of Marge ahead of the dubbing of the sixth season in 1996; the previous two actresses had left due to voice problems. She also voices Marge's sisters Patty and Selma and their mother Jacqueline.

De Francia's other dubbing credits include Princess Mononoke, Twin Peaks, Stargate SG-1 and South Park.
