= Annica Smedius =

Swedish actress

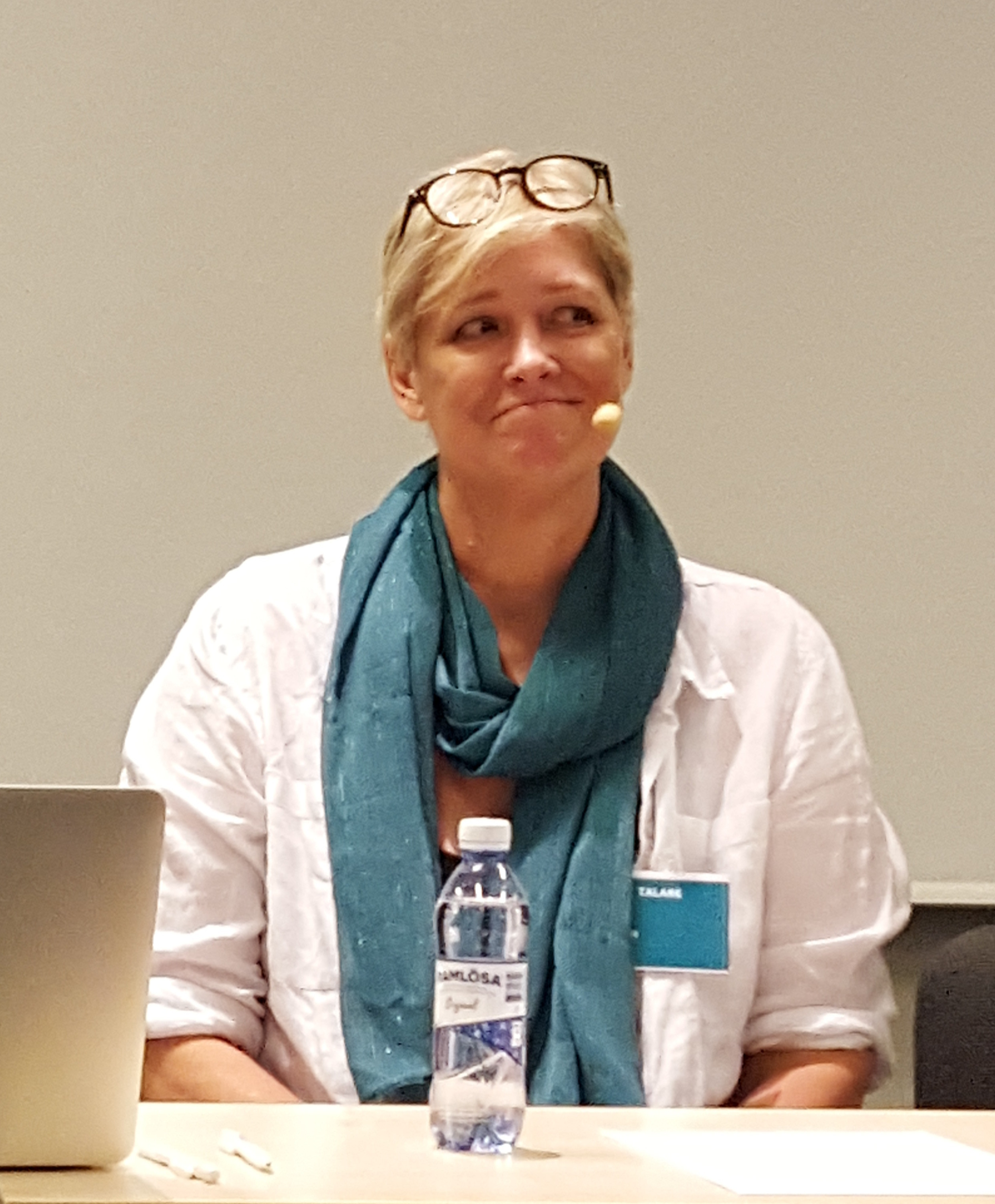
Smedius at Comic Con Stockholm, Sweden 2018

Karin Annica Smedius (born 15 April 1964, in Uddevalla) is a Swedish actress and singer.

== Career ==
Smedius is the Swedish voice for many cartoon characters such as Catwoman in Batman: The Animated Series and The New Batman Adventures, Princess Kale in Princess Gwenevere and the Jewel Riders, Magma and Shadowcat in X-Men: Evolution, Misty in Pokémon, Sadira in Aladdin, Sailor Mercury in Sailor Moon, Sam in Totally Spies, Tommy Pickles and Angelica Pickles in Rugrats, Velma Dinkley in Scooby-Doo and Pam-I-Am in Green Eggs and Ham, . She was also the voice of Bart Simpson when the series was dubbed for a brief period during the 1990s and returned to the role in the official Swedish dubbing of The Simpsons Movie.

Smedius sang in the bands Oddjob and Glenns Orkester and for many Swedish versions of Disney animated films.

Between 1991 and 1992, she worked as a radio presenter on Sveriges Radio P3. She can be also heard in many documentaries on TV4 and TV4 Fakta, and narrated Mission: Save Life (Uppdrag: Rädda Liv) organized by MSF. For several years she was also Axess TV's channel voice for announcements and trailers.

Smedius previously also worked as a translator between 1992 and 2002, for shows like Aladdin, Bear in the Big Blue House, The New Adventures of Winnie the Pooh, Princess Gwenevere and the Jewel Riders, Higglytown Heroes (as Mrs. Whiskers) and more.

As a voice actress, Smedius has been interviewed for numerous Swedish podcasts, most notably Röstskådespelarna and Art is Alive with Zeventine in collaboration with Paramount+ for the reboot of Rugrats for which she voiced Tommy and Angelica Pickles for the Swedish dub. She is the Swedish voice for the Canadian-American voice actress Jennifer Hale.

== Family ==
Smedius is the mother of voice actors Emil Smedius and Matilda Smedius.
