= Juan Carlos Revilla =

Peruvian Anglican Bishop

Juan Carlos Revilla is an Anglican Bishop.

Revilla was consecrated in 2015 as an Auxiliary Bishop in Peru.
