= Peasant Research and Promotion Center =

Bolivian organization (1970-)

- Centro de Investigación y Promoción del Campesinado
- Abbreviation: CIPCA
- Established: 1970; 56 years ago
- Location(s): 2706 Vincenti, Sopocachi La Paz, Bolivia
- Coordinates: 16°30′54.37″S 68°7′41.51″W
- Main organ: Mundos Rurales
- Affiliations: Jesuit, Catholic
- Website: www.cipca.org.bo

Peasant Research and Promotion Center (Spanish: Centro de Investigación y Promoción del Campesinado; CIPCA) was founded in Bolivia by three Jesuits in 1970 to seek the most effective ways for farmers to pursue structural development and to integrate into the social fabric in the country.

== History ==
CIPCA worked extensively with indigenous peasant organizations to facilitate their contribution to governmental and social change and to influence public policy. CIPCA has helped obtain land titles for indigenous communities for over 400,000 hectares in the Beni Department.
