= Carlos Revilla =

Spanish voice actor (1933–2000)

- Born: Carlos Revilla González; 22 January 1933; Salamanca, Spain
- Died: 28 September 2000 (aged 67); Madrid, Spain
- Occupations: Voice actor; voice director
- Years active: 1953–2000

Carlos Revilla González (22 January 1933 – 28 September 2000) was a Spanish voice actor and voice director known for his role as Homer Simpson in the Spanish version of The Simpsons, for which he was also the dubbing director.

== Biography ==
Born in Salamanca, Castile and León, Revilla left his medical studies at the age of 20 to become a radio actor on Cadena SER and later moved into dubbing of American films into Spanish. He dubbed the voices of actors such as Walter Matthau, Charlton Heston, Jack Lemmon and Bill Cosby and was the voice of KITT on Knight Rider in Spain. He worked on the dubbing of the first eleven seasons of The Simpsons, directing the entire process in addition to voicing Homer. He take part too on Spanish "Futurama" dubbing like director, casting director, and making secondary roles. Its casting was so good that was maintained on the seasons were doing after his death. Carlos took care of the Spanish adaptation of South Park, a successful dubbing that is maintained today.

Fox Broadcasting Company, original creators of The Simpsons, said that the Spanish dub of the show was the best in Europe.

== Death ==
Revilla died of a heart attack in Madrid on 28 September 2000 at the age of 67. The Spanish voice of Homer Simpson was passed on to Carlos Ysbert, who continues with the role.
