= Luis Revilla =

Bolivian politician (born 1972)

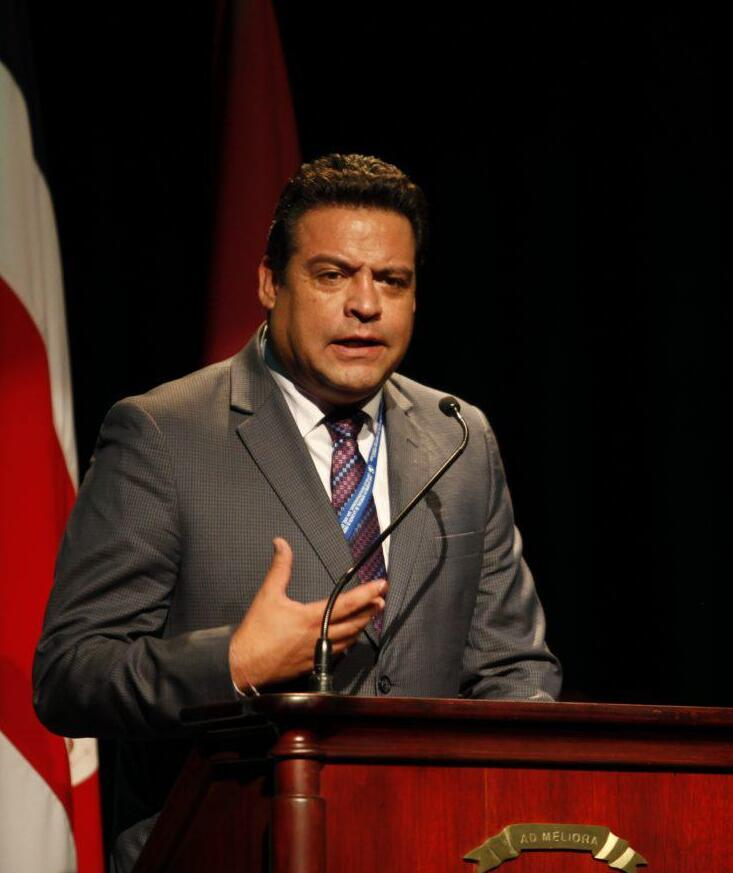
Luis Revilla in Costa Rica in 2018.

Luis "Lucho" Revilla Herrero (Note: In this name that follows Hispanic American naming customs, the first or paternal surname is Revilla and the second or maternal family name is Herrero.) (born 22 April 1972) is a Bolivian politician. Born in La Paz, he began a term as mayor of that city on 31 May 2010, succeeding Juan del Granado. Before becoming mayor, he worked over ten years for the city.

He was elected to a second term as mayor in 2015.

On 4 May 2026, he was sworn in for a five-year term as governor of the department of La Paz.

He is married to Maricruz Ribera.
