= Che Guevara =

Argentine revolutionary (1928–1967)

Comrade Che Guevara
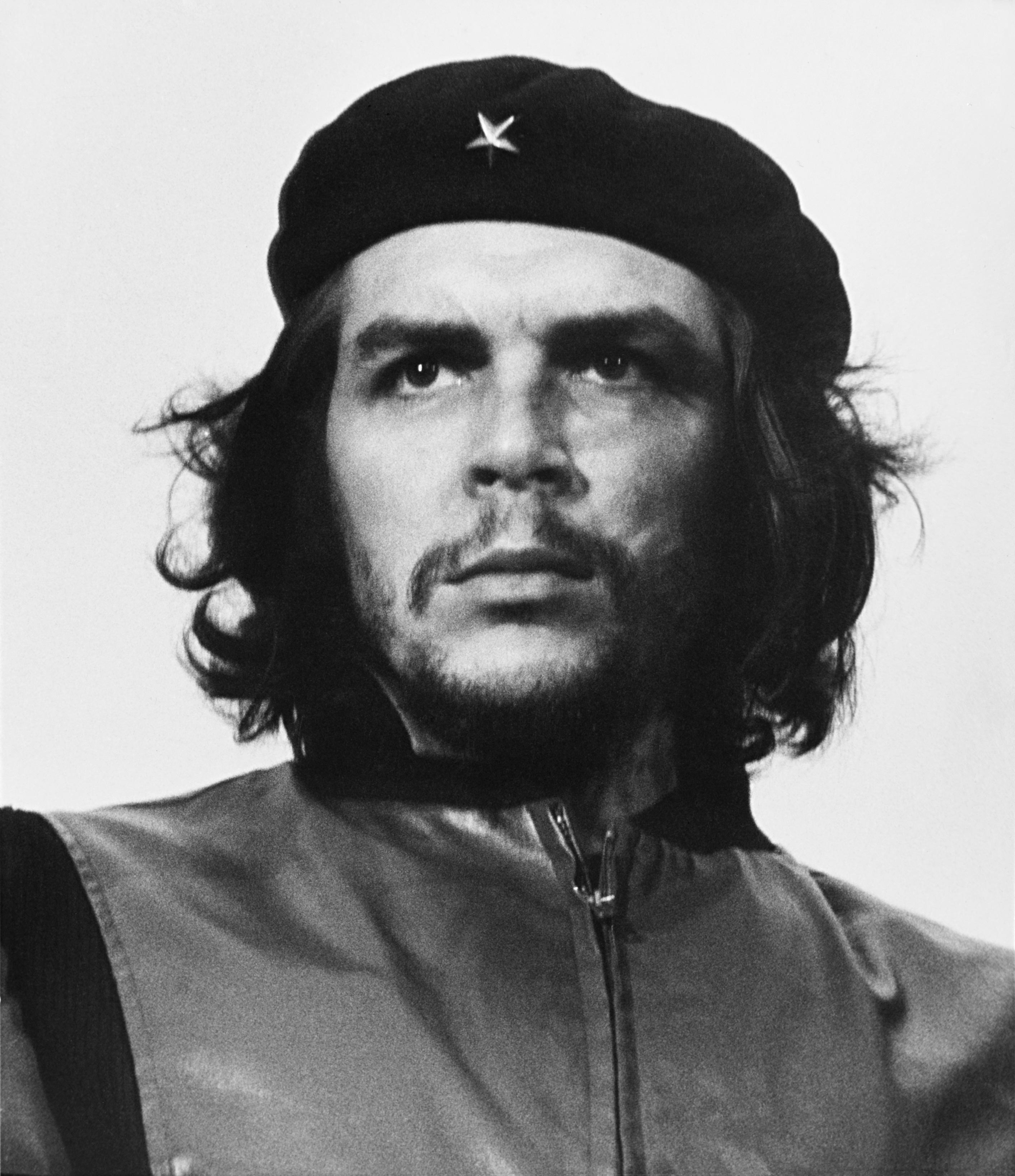
- Guerrillero Heroico, 1960

Minister of Industries of Cuba
- In office 11 February 1961 – 1 April 1965
- President: Osvaldo Dorticós Torrado
- Prime Minister: Fidel Castro
- Preceded by: Office established
- Succeeded by: Joel Domenech Benítez

President of the National Bank of Cuba
- In office 26 November 1959 – 23 February 1961
- Preceded by: Felipe Pazos
- Succeeded by: Raúl Cepero Bonilla

Personal details
- Born: Ernesto Guevara de la Serna; 14 May 1928 (Note: The date of birth recorded on his birth certificate was 14 June 1928, although one tertiary source (Julia Constenla, quoted by Jon Lee Anderson) asserts that he was actually born on 14 May of that year. Constenla alleges that she was told by Che's mother, Celia de la Serna, that she was already pregnant when she and Ernesto Guevara Lynch were married and that the date on the birth certificate of their son was forged to make it appear that he was born a month later than the actual date to avoid scandal. (Anderson 1997, pp. 3, 769.)) Rosario, Santa Fe, Argentina
- Died: 9 October 1967 (aged 39) La Higuera, Santa Cruz, Bolivia
- Cause of death: Execution by shooting
- Resting place: Che Guevara Mausoleum, Santa Clara, Cuba
- Citizenship: Argentina; Cuba
- Party: M-26-7 (1955–1962); PURSC (1962–1965)
- Spouses: Hilda Gadea (m. 1955; div. 1959) Aleida March (m. 1959)
- Children: 5, including Aleida
- Parent(s): Ernesto Guevara Lynch (father); Celia de la Serna (mother)
- Education: University of Buenos Aires
- Occupation: Author; diplomat; guerrilla; physician
- Known for: Guevarism
- Nicknames: Che; Fuser

Military service
- Allegiance: Cuba
- Branch/service: Cuban Revolutionary Armed Forces (FAR); National Liberation Army of Bolivia
- Years of service: 1955–1967
- Rank: Comandante
- Unit: 26th of July Movement
- Commands: Commanding officer, FAR
- Battles/wars: Cuban Revolution; Battle of Alegría de Pío; Battle of La Plata; Attack on El Uvero; Operation Verano; Battle of Las Mercedes; Battle of Santa Clara; Bay of Pigs Invasion; Cuban Missile Crisis; Congo Crisis; Simba rebellion; Operation South; Ñancahuazú Guerrilla
- Che Guevara's voice Guevara speaking to the youth in Havana; Recorded 1962

Ernesto "Che" Guevara de la Serna (Note: English: /ˈtʃeɪ ɡeɪˈvɑːrə/ CHAY gay-VAR-ə or /- ɡəˈ-/ - gə-, Spanish: [eɾˈnesto ˈtʃe ɣeˈβaɾa].) (14 May 1928 – 9 October 1967) was an Argentine Marxist revolutionary, author, guerrilla leader, diplomat, politician, and military theorist. A major figure of the Cuban Revolution, his stylized visage has become a countercultural symbol of rebellion and global insignia in popular culture.

As a medical student, Guevara travelled throughout South America and was appalled by the poverty, hunger, and disease he witnessed. His burgeoning desire to help overturn what he saw as the capitalist exploitation of Latin America by the US prompted his involvement in Guatemala's social reforms under President Jacobo Árbenz, whose CIA-assisted overthrow at the behest of the United Fruit Company solidified Guevara's political ideology. In Mexico City, Guevara met Raúl and Fidel Castro, joined their 26th of July Movement, and sailed to Cuba aboard the yacht Granma with the intention of overthrowing US-backed dictator Fulgencio Batista. Guevara rose to prominence among the insurgents, was promoted to second-in-command, and played a pivotal role in the two-year guerrilla campaign which deposed the Batista regime.

After the Cuban Revolution, Guevara played key roles in the new government. These included reviewing the appeals and death sentences for those convicted as war criminals during the revolutionary tribunals, instituting agrarian land reform as minister of industries, helping spearhead a successful literacy campaign, serving as president of the National Bank and instructional director for Cuba's armed forces, and traversing the globe as a diplomat on behalf of Cuban socialism. Such positions allowed him to play a central role in training the militia forces who repelled the Bay of Pigs Invasion, and bringing Soviet nuclear-armed ballistic missiles to Cuba, a decision which precipitated the 1962 Cuban Missile Crisis. Guevara was a prolific writer and diarist, composing a seminal guerrilla warfare manual, along with a best-selling memoir about his motorcycle journey. His experiences and studying of Marxism–Leninism led him to posit that the Third World's underdevelopment and dependence was an intrinsic result of imperialism, neocolonialism, and monopoly capitalism, with the only remedies being proletarian internationalism and world revolution. Guevara left Cuba in 1965 to foment continental revolutions across Africa and South America, first unsuccessfully in Congo-Kinshasa and later in Bolivia, where he was captured by CIA-assisted Bolivian forces and summarily executed.

Guevara remains a revered and reviled figure, polarized in the collective imagination in biographies, memoirs, essays, documentaries, songs, and films. As a result of his perceived martyrdom, poetic invocations for class struggle, and desire to create the consciousness of a "new man" driven by moral rather than material incentives, Guevara has evolved into a quintessential icon of many leftist movements. His critics accuse him of promoting authoritarianism and endorsing violence against his opponents. Despite disagreement on his legacy, Time named him one of the 100 most influential people of the 20th century, while an Alberto Korda photograph of him, titled Guerrillero Heroico, was cited by the Maryland Institute College of Art as "the most famous photograph in the world".

== Early life ==
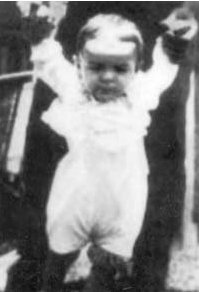
Baby Ernesto

Ernesto Guevara was born to Ernesto Guevara Lynch and Celia de la Serna y Llosa, on 14 May 1928, in Rosario, Argentina. Although the legal name on his birth certificate was "Ernesto Guevara", his name sometimes appears with "de la Serna" or "Lynch" accompanying it. He was the eldest of five in an upper-class Argentine family of pre-independence immigrants that have Spanish, Basque, and Irish ancestry. (Note: Che's last name Guevara derives from the Castilianized form of the Basque Gebara, a habitational name from the province of Álava, while his grandmother, Ana Lynch, was a descendant of Patrick Lynch, who emigrated from County Galway, Ireland in the 1740s.) Two of Guevara's 18th-century ancestors included Luis María Peralta, a Californio landowner in colonial California, and Patrick Lynch, who emigrated from Ireland to the Río de la Plata Governorate. Referring to Che's "restless" nature, his father declared "the first thing to note is that in my son's veins flowed the blood of the Irish rebels". Che Guevara was fond of Ireland, and according to Irish actress Maureen O'Hara, "Che would talk about Ireland and all the guerilla warfare that had taken place there. He knew every battle in Ireland and all of its history" and told her that everything he knew about Ireland he learned on his grandmother's knee.

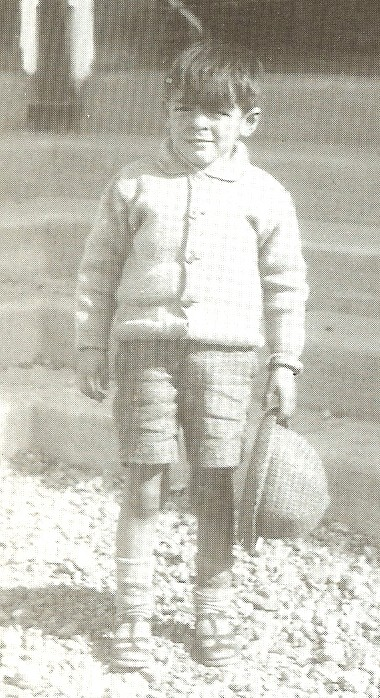
Ernesto aged 5 in 1933

Early in life, Ernestito (as he was then called) developed an "affinity for the poor". Growing up in a family with leftist leanings, Guevara was introduced to a spectrum of political perspectives. His father, a staunch supporter of Republicans from the Spanish Civil War, would host veterans in the home. As a young man, he contemplated a career selling insecticides, and set up a laboratory in his family's garage to experiment with effective mixtures of talc and gammaxene under the brand name Vendaval, but was forced to abandon his efforts after suffering a severe asthmatic reaction.

Despite bouts of acute asthma that affected him throughout his life, he excelled as an athlete, enjoying swimming, football, golf, and shooting, while becoming an "untiring" cyclist. He was an avid rugby union player. Sources say he first played for Estudiantes of Córdoba, then San Isidro Club (1947), Yporá Rugby Club (1948), and Atalaya Polo Club (1949), although other sources claim he played for Club Universitario de Buenos Aires (CUBA), at fly-half. His rugby playing earned him the nickname "Fuser"—a contraction of El Furibundo (furious) and his mother's surname, de la Serna—for his aggressive play.

=== Intellectual and literary interests ===
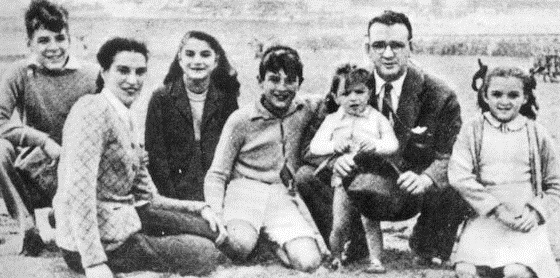
Teenage Ernesto (left) with his parents and siblings, c. 1944. Left to right: Celia (mother), Celia (sister), Roberto, Juan Martín, Ernesto (father) and Ana María

Guevara learned chess from his father and began participating in tournaments by the age of 12. During adolescence and throughout his life, he was passionate about poetry, especially that of Pablo Neruda, John Keats, Antonio Machado, Federico García Lorca, Gabriela Mistral, César Vallejo, and Walt Whitman. He could recite Rudyard Kipling's If— and José Hernández's Martín Fierro by heart. The Guevara home contained 3,000 books, which allowed Guevara to be an enthusiastic and eclectic reader, with interests including Karl Marx, William Faulkner, André Gide, Emilio Salgari, and Jules Verne. He enjoyed the works of Jawaharlal Nehru, Franz Kafka, Albert Camus, Vladimir Lenin, and Jean-Paul Sartre, as well as Anatole France, Friedrich Engels, H. G. Wells, and Robert Frost.

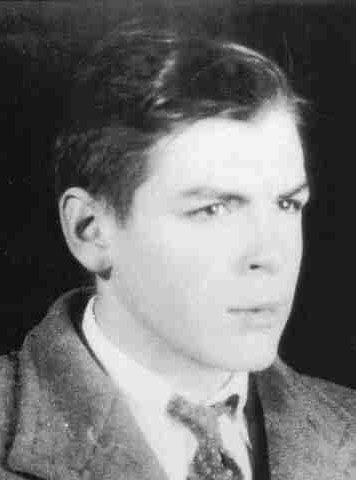
Guevara around 1945

He developed an interest in the Latin American writers Horacio Quiroga, Ciro Alegría, Jorge Icaza, Rubén Darío, and Miguel Asturias. Many of these authors' ideas he cataloged in his notebooks of concepts, definitions, and philosophies of influential intellectuals. These included composing analytical sketches of Buddha and Aristotle, along with examining Bertrand Russell on love and patriotism, Jack London on society, and Nietzsche on death. Sigmund Freud's ideas fascinated him, and he quoted him on topics from dreams and libido to narcissism and the Oedipus complex. His favorite subjects included philosophy, mathematics, engineering, political science, sociology, history, and archaeology. A 1958 CIA personality report made note of Guevara's range of interests and intellect – describing him as "quite well read", while adding that "Che is fairly intellectual for a Latino".

=== Motorcycle journey ===
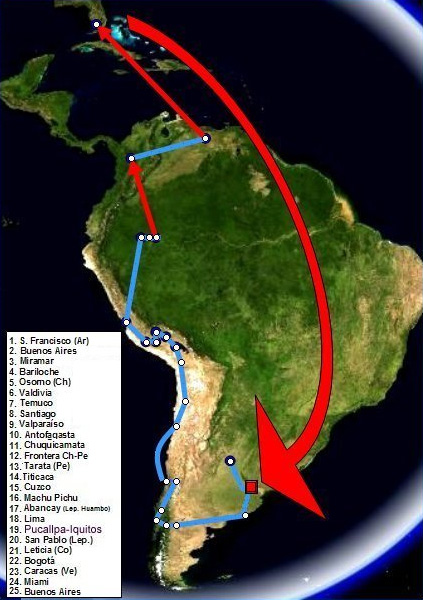
A map of Guevara's 1952 trip with Alberto Granado. Red arrows correspond to air travel.

Guevara (right) with Alberto Granado (left) in June 1952 on the Amazon River aboard their "Mambo-Tango" wooden raft, which was a gift from the lepers whom they had treated

In 1948, Guevara entered the University of Buenos Aires to study medicine. His "hunger to explore the world" led him to intersperse his collegiate pursuits with two long introspective journeys that changed the way he viewed himself and economic conditions in Latin America. The first expedition, in 1950, was a 4,500-kilometer (2,800 mi) solo trip through the rural provinces of northern Argentina on a bicycle on which he had installed a small engine. Guevara then spent six months working as a nurse on Argentina's merchant marine freighters and oil tankers. His second expedition, in 1952, was a nine-month, 8,000-kilometer (5,000 mi) continental motorcycle trek through South America. He took a year off his studies to embark with his friend, Alberto Granado, with the final goal of spending a few weeks volunteering at the San Pablo leper colony in Peru, on the banks of the Amazon River. Guevara claimed to have first been introduced to the work of Karl Marx by Dr. Hugo Pesce, a leprosy specialist and former protégé of José Carlos Mariátegui.

In Chile, Guevara was angered by the working conditions of the miners at Anaconda's Chuquicamata copper mine, moved by his overnight encounter in the Atacama Desert with a persecuted communist couple who did not even own a blanket, describing them as "the shivering flesh-and-blood victims of capitalist exploitation". On the way to Machu Picchu he was stunned by the poverty of rural areas, where peasant farmers worked small plots owned by wealthy landlords. Guevara was impressed by the camaraderie among the people living in a leper colony, stating, "The highest forms of human solidarity and loyalty arise among such lonely and desperate people." Guevara used notes taken during this trip to write an account (not published until 1995), titled The Motorcycle Diaries, which became a New York Times best seller, and a 2004 film.

A motorcycle journey the length of South America awakened him to the injustice of US domination in the hemisphere, and to the suffering colonialism brought to its original inhabitants.

— George Galloway, British politician, 2006

The journey took Guevara through Argentina, Chile, Peru, Ecuador, Colombia, Venezuela, Panama, and Miami, before returning home to Buenos Aires. By the end, he came to view Latin America not as a collection of nations, but a single entity requiring a continent-wide liberation strategy. His conception of a borderless, united Hispanic America sharing a Latino heritage was a theme that recurred during his revolutionary activities. Upon returning to Argentina, he received his medical degree in June 1953.

Guevara later remarked that, through his travels in Latin America, he came in "close contact with poverty, hunger and disease" along with the "inability to treat a child because of lack of money" and "stupefaction provoked by the continual hunger and punishment" that leads a father to "accept the loss of a son as an unimportant accident". Guevara cited these experiences as convincing him that to "help these people", he needed to leave medicine and consider the political arena of armed struggle.

== Early political activity ==
=== Activism in Guatemala ===
After completing his medical degree, Guevara set out again on 7 July 1953, this time to Bolivia, Peru, Ecuador, Panama, Costa Rica, Nicaragua, Honduras, and El Salvador. On 10 December, before leaving for Guatemala, Guevara sent an update to his aunt Beatriz from San José, Costa Rica. In the letter Guevara speaks of traversing the dominion of the United Fruit Company, a journey which convinced him that the company's capitalist system was disadvantageous to the average citizen. He adopted an aggressive tone to frighten his conservative relatives, and the letter ends with Guevara swearing on an image of the then-recently deceased Joseph Stalin, not to rest until these "octopuses have been vanquished". Later that month, Guevara arrived in Guatemala, where President Jacobo Árbenz headed a democratically elected government that, through land reform and other initiatives, was attempting to end the latifundia agricultural system. President Árbenz had enacted a land reform program, where uncultivated portions of large holdings were to be appropriated and redistributed to landless peasants. The largest landowner was the United Fruit Company, from which the government had taken 225,000 acres (91,000 ha) of uncultivated land. Pleased with the direction in which the nation was heading, Guevara decided to make his home in Guatemala to "perfect himself and accomplish whatever may be necessary in order to become a true revolutionary".

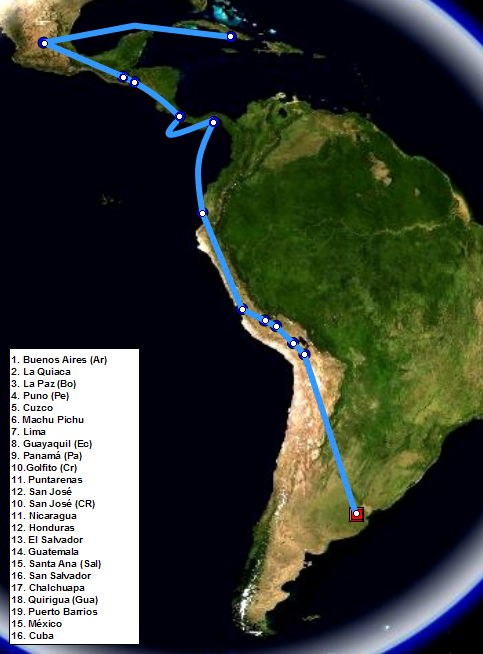
A map of Che Guevara's travels between 1953 and 1956, including his journey aboard the Granma

In Guatemala City, Guevara sought out Hilda Gadea Acosta, a Peruvian economist who was politically well-connected as a member of the left-leaning, Alianza Popular Revolucionaria Americana (APRA). She introduced Guevara to high-level officials in the Árbenz government. Guevara then established contact with a group of Cuban exiles linked to Fidel Castro through the 26 July 1953 attack on the Moncada Barracks in Santiago de Cuba. During this period, he acquired his nickname, due to his frequent use of the Argentine filler expression che (a multi-purpose discourse marker, like the syllable "eh" in English). Guevara was hosted by other Central American exiles, one of whom, Helena Leiva de Holst, provided him with food and lodging, discussed her travels to study Marxism in Russia and China, and to whom Guevara dedicated a poem, "Invitación al camino".

In May 1954, a ship carrying infantry and light artillery weapons was dispatched by communist Czechoslovakia for the Árbenz government and arrived in Puerto Barrios. As a result, the US government—which since 1953 had been tasked by President Eisenhower to remove Árbenz from power in the CIA operation code-named PBSuccess—responded by saturating Guatemala with anti-Árbenz propaganda through radio and air-dropped leaflets, and began bombing using unmarked airplanes. The US sponsored an armed force of several hundred anti-Árbenz Guatemalan refugees and mercenaries headed by Carlos Castillo Armas to help remove the Árbenz government. On 27 June, Árbenz was pressured to resign. This allowed Armas and his CIA-assisted forces to march into Guatemala City and establish a military junta, which elected Armas president on 7 July. The Armas regime consolidated power by rounding up and executing suspected communists, while crushing labor unions and reversing the agrarian reforms.

Guevara was eager to fight for Árbenz, and joined an armed militia organized by communist youth. Once the bombing began, he tried to organize units to guard the capital, and move arms to create stronger resistance. However, frustrated with that group's inaction, Guevara returned to medical duties. Following the coup, he again volunteered to fight, but Árbenz took refuge in the Mexican embassy and told foreign supporters to leave. Guevara's calls to resist were noted by supporters of the coup, and he was marked for murder. After Gadea was arrested, Guevara sought protection in the Argentine consulate, where he remained until he received a safe-conduct pass weeks later, and made his way to Mexico. While in Mexico, he met Castro and joined him in what became the Cuban Revolution.

The overthrow of the Árbenz government and establishment of the right-wing Armas dictatorship cemented Guevara's view of the US as an imperialist power that attempted to destroy any government that sought to redress the socioeconomic inequality endemic to Latin America and other developing countries. Guevara stated:

The last Latin American revolutionary democracy – that of Jacobo Árbenz – failed as a result of the cold premeditated aggression carried out by the United States. Its visible head was the Secretary of State John Foster Dulles, a man who, through a rare coincidence, was also a stockholder and attorney for the United Fruit Company.

Guevara's conviction strengthened that Marxism, achieved through armed struggle and defended by an armed populace, was the only way to rectify conditions. Gadea wrote later, "It was Guatemala which finally convinced him of the necessity for armed struggle and for taking the initiative against imperialism. By the time he left, he was sure of this."

=== Exile in Mexico ===
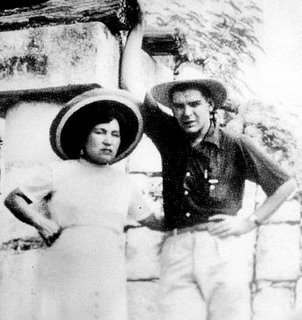
Guevara with his first wife Hilda Gadea at Chichen Itza during their honeymoon trip

Guevara arrived in Mexico City in September 1954, and worked in the allergy section of the General Hospital and at the Hospital Infantil de Mexico. He gave lectures on medicine at the Faculty of Medicine in the National Autonomous University of Mexico and worked as a news photographer for Latina News Agency. His first wife Hilda notes in her memoir My Life with Che, that Guevara considered working as a doctor in Africa and continued to be troubled by the poverty around him. In one instance, Hilda describes Guevara's obsession with an elderly washerwoman whom he was treating, remarking that he saw her as "representative of the most forgotten and exploited class". Hilda later found a poem that Che had dedicated to the old woman, containing "a promise to fight for a better world, for a better life for all the poor and exploited".

During this time he renewed his friendship with Ñico López and other Cuban exiles whom he had met in Guatemala. In June 1955, López introduced him to Raúl Castro, who subsequently introduced him to his older brother, Fidel Castro, the revolutionary leader who had formed the 26th of July Movement and was now plotting to overthrow the dictatorship of Fulgencio Batista. During a long conversation with Fidel on the night of their first meeting, Guevara concluded that the Cuban's cause was the one for which he had been searching and before daybreak he had signed up as a member of 26 July Movement. Despite their "contrasting personalities", Che and Fidel began to foster what dual biographer Simon Reid-Henry deemed a "revolutionary friendship that would change the world" as a result of their coinciding commitment to anti-imperialism.

By this point in Guevara's life, he deemed that US-controlled conglomerates had installed and supported repressive regimes around the world. In this vein, he considered Batista a "U.S. puppet whose strings needed cutting". Although he planned to be the group's combat medic, Guevara participated in the military training. The key portion of training involved learning hit and run tactics of guerrilla warfare. Guevara and the others underwent arduous 15-hour marches over mountains, across rivers, and through the undergrowth, learning the procedures of ambush and quick retreat. Guevara was instructor Alberto Bayo's "prize student", scoring highest on the tests. He was named "the best guerrilla of them all" by General Bayo.

Guevara married Hilda in Mexico in September 1955, before embarking on his plan to assist in the liberation of Cuba.

== Cuban Revolution ==
=== Granma invasion ===
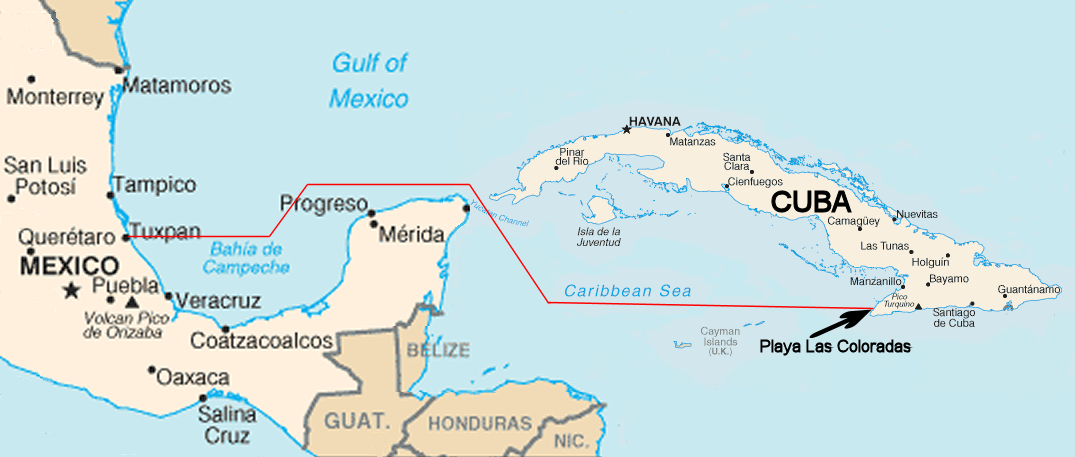
Journey of the yacht "Granma", from Mexico to Cuba

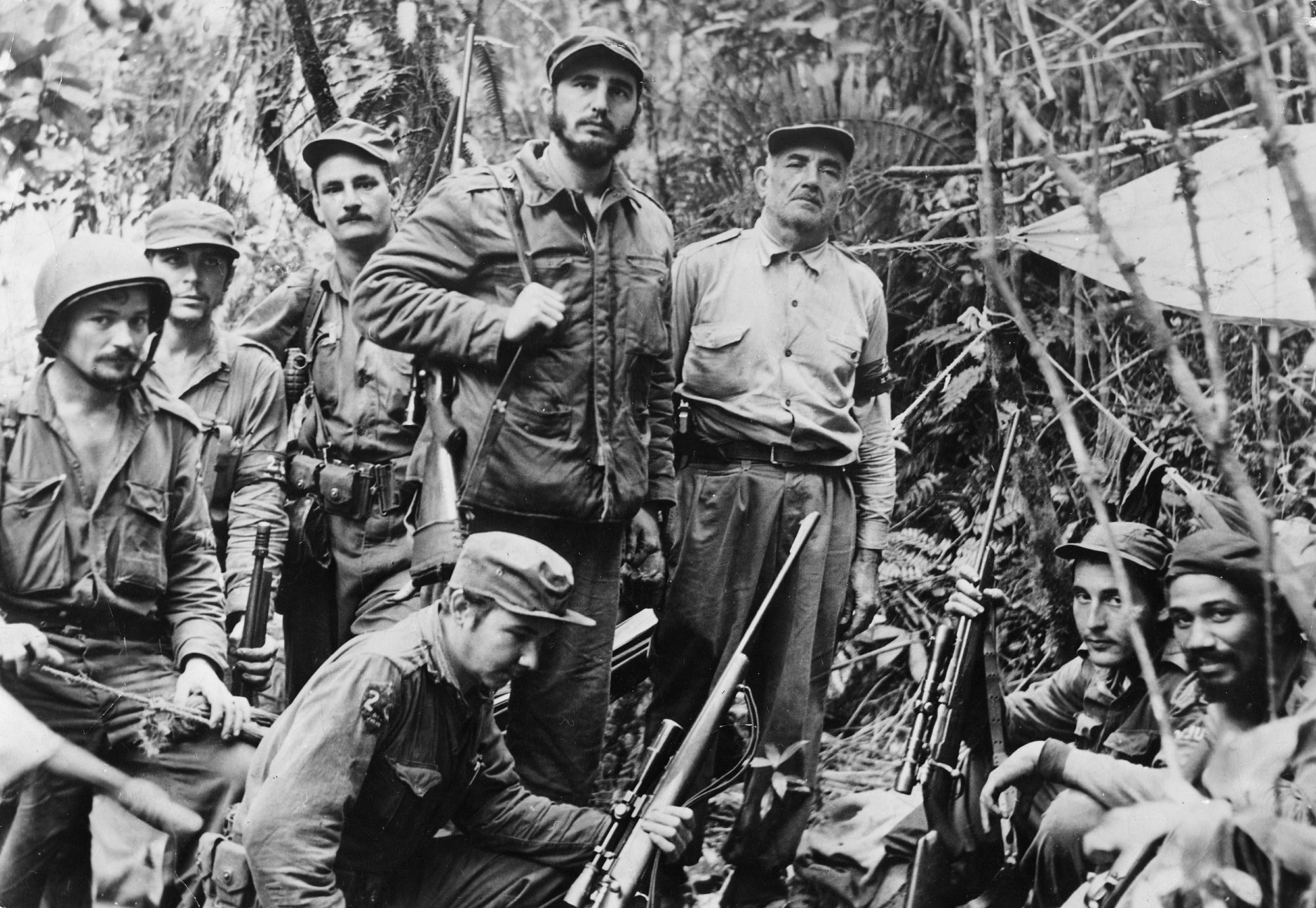
Granma survivors in the Sierra Maestra. Fidel Castro stands at center. Che Guevara stands second from left.

The first step in Castro's revolutionary plan was an assault on Cuba from Mexico via the Granma, an old, leaky cabin cruiser. They set out for Cuba on 25 November 1956. Attacked by Batista's military soon after landing, many of the 82 men were killed in the attack or executed upon capture; only 22 found each other afterwards. During this initial confrontation, Guevara laid down his medical supplies and picked up a box of ammunition dropped by a fleeing comrade, proving to be a symbolic moment in Che's life.

Only a small band of revolutionaries survived to re-group as a bedraggled fighting force deep in the Sierra Maestra mountains, where they received support from the urban guerrilla network of Frank País, the 26 July Movement, and campesinos. With the group withdrawn to the Sierra, people wondered whether Castro was alive until early 1957, when an interview by Herbert Matthews appeared in The New York Times. The article presented a lasting, almost mythical image of Castro and the guerrillas. Guevara was not present for the interview, but began to realize the importance of the media. As supplies and morale diminished, and with an allergy to mosquito bites which resulted in agonizing walnut-sized cysts on his body, Guevara considered these "the most painful days of the war".

During Guevara's time living among the poor subsistence farmers of the Sierra Maestra mountains, he discovered there were no schools, no electricity, minimal access to healthcare, and 40 percent of adults were illiterate. Guevara became an integral part of the rebel army and "convinced Castro with competence, diplomacy and patience". Guevara set up factories to make grenades, built ovens to bake bread, and organized schools to teach illiterate campesinos to read and write. Guevara established health clinics, workshops to teach military tactics, and a newspaper to disseminate information. The man whom Time dubbed three years later "Castro's brain" at this point was promoted by Castro to Comandante of a second army column.

=== Role as commander ===
As second-in-command, Guevara was a harsh disciplinarian who sometimes shot defectors. Deserters were punished as traitors, and Guevara was known to send squads to track those seeking to abandon their duties. Guevara became feared for his ruthlessness. During the guerrilla campaign, Guevara was responsible for summary executions of men accused of being informers, deserters, or spies. In his diaries, Guevara described the first such execution, of Eutimio Guerra, a peasant who had acted as a guide for the guerrillas, but admitted treason when it was discovered he accepted the promise of ten thousand pesos for repeatedly giving away the rebels' position for attack by the air force. Such information also allowed Batista's army to burn the homes of peasants sympathetic to the revolution. Upon Guerra's request that they "end his life quickly", Che stepped forward and shot him in the head, writing "The situation was uncomfortable for the people and for Eutimio so I ended the problem giving him a shot with a .32 pistol in the right side of the brain, with exit orifice in the right temporal [lobe]." His scientific notations and matter-of-fact description suggested a "remarkable detachment to violence" by that point in the war. Later, Guevara published a literary account of the incident, titled "Death of a Traitor", where he transfigured Eutimio's betrayal and pre-execution request that the revolution "take care of his children", into a "revolutionary parable about redemption through sacrifice".

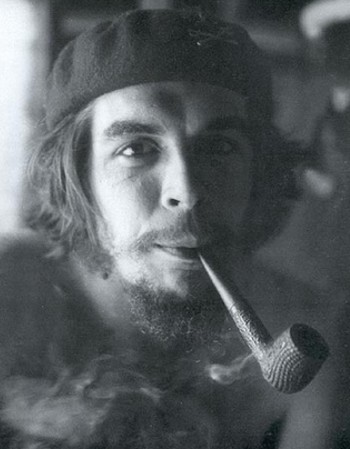
Guevara at his guerrilla base in the Escambray Mountains

Although he maintained a harsh disposition, Guevara also viewed his role as one of a teacher, entertaining his men during breaks between engagements with readings from Robert Louis Stevenson, Miguel de Cervantes, and Spanish lyric poets. Inspired by José Martí's principle of "literacy without borders", Guevara ensured that his rebel fighters made daily time to teach the uneducated campesinos with whom they fought to read and write, in what Guevara termed the "battle against ignorance". Tomás Alba, who fought under Guevara's command, stated that "Che was loved, in spite of being stern and demanding. We would (have) given our life for him."

Castro described Guevara as intelligent, daring, and an exemplary leader who "had great moral authority over his troops". Castro remarked that Guevara took too many risks, even having a "tendency toward foolhardiness". Guevara's teenage lieutenant, Joel Iglesias, recounted such actions, noting that Guevara's behavior in combat even brought admiration from the enemy. On one occasion Iglesias recounts the time he had been wounded in battle, stating "Che ran out to me, defying the bullets, threw me over his shoulder, and got me out of there. The guards didn't dare fire at him ... later they told me he made a great impression on them when they saw him run out with his pistol stuck in his belt, ignoring the danger, they didn't dare shoot."

Guevara was instrumental in creating the clandestine radio station Radio Rebelde (Rebel Radio) in February 1958, which broadcast statements by the 26 July movement, and provided radiotelephone communication between the growing number of rebel columns. Guevara had apparently been inspired to create the station by observing the effectiveness of CIA supplied radio in Guatemala in ousting the government of Jacobo Árbenz Guzmán.

To quell the rebellion, Cuban government troops began executing rebel prisoners on the spot, and regularly rounded up, tortured, and shot civilians as a tactic of intimidation. By March 1958, the continued atrocities carried out by Batista's forces led the US to stop selling arms to Cuba. Then, in July 1958, Guevara played a critical role in the Battle of Las Mercedes by using his column to halt a force of 1,500 men called up by Batista's General Cantillo in a plan to encircle and destroy Castro's forces. Years later, Major Larry Bockman of the United States Marine Corps analyzed and described Che's tactical appreciation of this battle as "brilliant". During this time Guevara became an "expert" at leading hit-and-run tactics against Batista's army, and then fading back into the countryside before the army could counterattack.

=== Final offensive ===
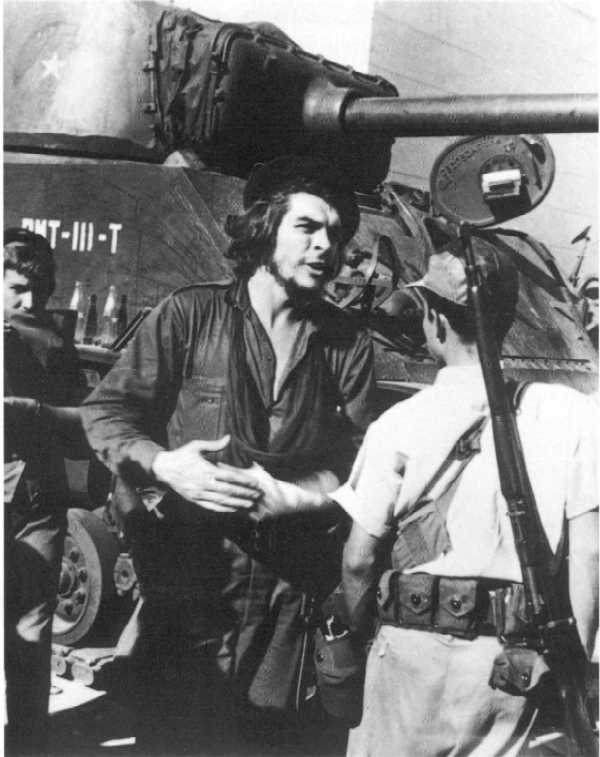
After the Battle of Santa Clara, 1 January 1959

As the war extended, Guevara led a new column of fighters dispatched westward for the final push towards Havana. Travelling by foot, Guevara embarked on a difficult 7-week march, only travelling at night to avoid an ambush and often not eating for several days. In the closing days of December 1958, Guevara's task was to cut the island in half by taking the Las Villas province. He executed a series of "brilliant tactical victories" that gave him control of all but the province's capital Santa Clara. Guevara then directed his "suicide squad" in the attack on Santa Clara, which became the decisive military victory of the revolution. In the six weeks leading up to the battle, there were times when his men were completely surrounded, outgunned, and overrun. Che's eventual victory despite being outnumbered 10:1 remains in the view of some observers a "remarkable tour de force in modern warfare".

Radio Rebelde broadcast the first reports that Guevara's column had taken Santa Clara on New Year's Eve 1958. This contradicted reports by the heavily controlled national news media, which had at one stage reported Guevara's death during the fighting. At 3am on 1 January 1959, upon learning that his generals were negotiating a separate peace with Guevara, Fulgencio Batista boarded a plane in Havana and fled for the Dominican Republic, along with a "fortune of more than $300,000,000 through graft and payoffs". On 2 January, Guevara entered Havana to take control of the capital. Castro took six days to arrive, as he stopped to rally support in large cities on his way to rolling victoriously into Havana on 8 January 1959. The death toll from the two years of revolutionary fighting was 2,000 people.

== Political career in Cuba ==
=== Revolutionary tribunals ===
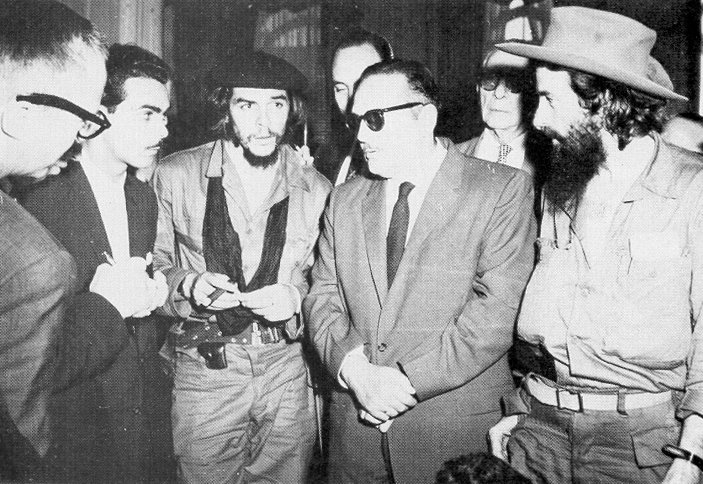
(Right to left) rebel leader Camilo Cienfuegos, Cuban President Manuel Urrutia Lleó, and Guevara (January 1959)

The first political crisis arose over what to do with the captured Batista officials who had perpetrated the worst of the repression. During the rebellion against Batista, the general command of the rebel army, led by Castro, introduced into the territories under its control the 19th-century penal law known as the Ley de la Sierra (Law of the Sierra). This law included the death penalty for serious crimes, whether perpetrated by the Batista regime or supporters of the revolution. In 1959, the revolutionary government extended its application to the whole of the republic and those it considered war criminals, captured and tried after the revolution. According to the Cuban Ministry of Justice, this latter extension was supported by most of the population, and followed the same procedure as those in the Nuremberg trials after World War II.

To implement a portion of this plan, Castro named Guevara commander of the La Cabaña Fortress prison for a five-month tenure (2 January-12 June 1959). Guevara was charged with purging the Batista army and consolidating victory by exacting "revolutionary justice" against those regarded as traitors, chivatos (informants) or war criminals. As commander of La Cabaña, Guevara reviewed the appeals of those convicted. The tribunals were conducted by 2–3 army officers, an assessor, and a respected local citizen. On some occasions, the penalty delivered was death by firing-squad. Raúl Gómez Treto, legal advisor to the Cuban Ministry of Justice, has argued the death penalty was justified to prevent citizens from taking justice into their own hands, as had happened 20 years earlier in the anti-Machado rebellion. Biographers note that in January 1959 the Cuban public was in a "lynching mood", with 93% public approval for the tribunal process.

One of the first public executions ordered by Guevara was of Colonel Cornelio Rojas, which was broadcast on television. Rojas was the chief of police in Santa Clara, whose officers had held out against the rebels until the last moment of the Battle of Santa Clara. After his capture, Rojas' family received a letter of safe departure, implying he'd be kept alive and released. Soon afterwards, Guevara ordered Rojas to be executed on 7 January 1959. When the footage was aired, Rojas' family was relieved to see him alive, but after realizing he was being placed in front of a firing squad, began to scream as he was then shot. The footage was later broadcast around the world, becoming one of the first killings ever aired on television.

On 22 January 1959, a Universal Newsreel broadcast in the US featured Castro asking an estimated one million Cubans whether they approved of the executions, and being met with a roaring "¡Sí!" (yes). With between 1,000 and 20,000 Cubans estimated to have been killed at the hands of Batista's collaborators, and many of the accused war criminals sentenced to death accused of torture and physical atrocities, the new government carried out executions, punctuated by cries from the crowds of "¡al paredón!" ([to the] wall!), "without respect for due process".

I have yet to find a single credible source pointing to a case where Che executed "an innocent". Those persons executed by Guevara or on his orders were condemned for the usual crimes punishable by death at times of war or in its aftermath: desertion, treason or crimes such as rape, torture or murder. I should add that my research spanned five years, and included anti-Castro Cubans among the Cuban-American exile community in Miami and elsewhere.

— Jon Lee Anderson, author of Che Guevara: A Revolutionary Life, PBS forum

Several hundred people were executed, with Guevara's jurisdictional death total at La Cabaña ranging from 55 to 105. Conflicting views exist of Guevara's attitude towards the executions at La Cabaña. Some exiled opposition biographers report that he relished the rituals of the firing squad, and organized them with gusto, while others relate that Guevara pardoned as many prisoners as he could. All sides acknowledge that Guevara had become a hardened man who had no qualms about the death penalty, or summary and collective trials. If the only way to "defend the revolution was to execute its enemies, he would not be swayed by humanitarian or political arguments". In a 1959 letter to Luis Paredes López in Buenos Aires, Guevara states unequivocally: "The executions by firing squads are not only a necessity for the people of Cuba, but also an imposition of the people."

=== Early political office ===
In mid-January 1959, Guevara went to live at a villa in Tarará to recover from a violent asthma attack. He started the Tarará Group that formed plans for Cuba's social, political, and economic development. Che began to write Guerrilla Warfare. When Hilda Gadea arrived in Cuba, Guevara told her he was involved with another woman, and they agreed to divorce, which was finalized on 22 May.

On 27 January, Guevara made a significant speech where he talked about "the social ideas of the rebel army". He declared that the main concern of the new government was "the social justice that land redistribution brings about". In February, the government proclaimed Guevara "a Cuban citizen by birth" in recognition of his role in the triumph. In May, the agrarian reform law, crafted by Guevara, went into effect, limiting the size of farms to 1,000 acres (400 ha). Holdings over this were expropriated by the government, redistributed to peasants in 67-acre (270,000 m^{2}) parcels or held as state-run communes. The law stipulated that foreigners could not own sugar-plantations.

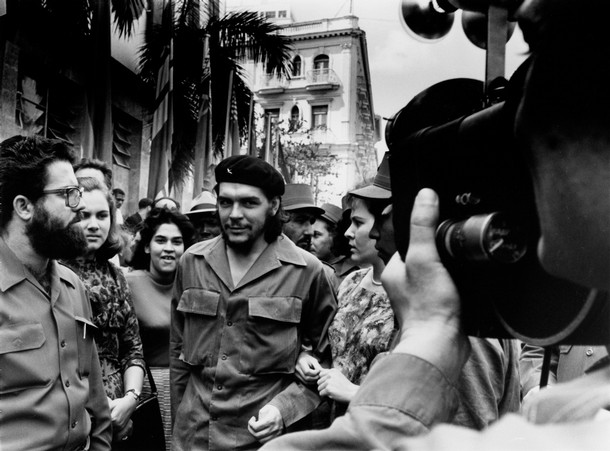
Guevara in 1960, walking through the streets of Havana with his second wife Aleida March (right)

On 2 June, he married Aleida March, a Cuban-born member of 26 July movement with whom he had been living since 1958. Guevara returned to the seaside village of Tarara in June for his honeymoon with Aleida. A civil ceremony was held at La Cabaña military fortress. Guevara would have five children from his two marriages.

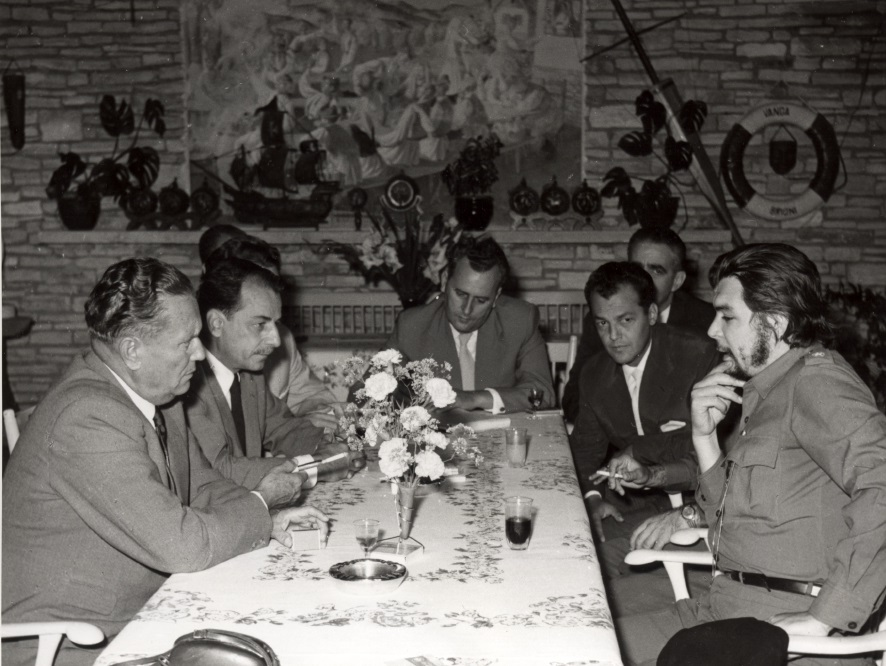
Che Guevara meeting Josip Broz Tito, during Guevara's 1959 diplomatic travels.

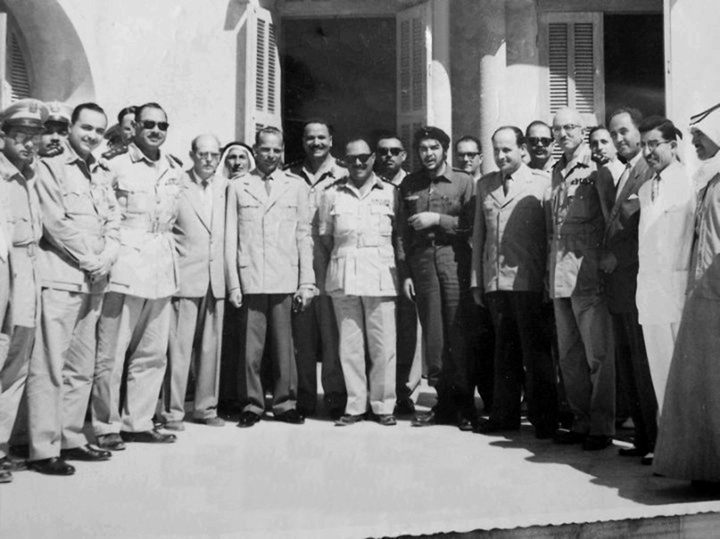
Che Guevara visiting Gaza during his diplomatic tour. (1959)

Castro sent Guevara out on a three-month tour of mostly Bandung Pact countries (Morocco, Sudan, Egypt, Syria, Pakistan, India, Sri Lanka, Burma, Thailand, Indonesia, Japan, Yugoslavia, and Greece), Singapore and Hong Kong. Sending Guevara away allowed Castro to distance himself from Guevara and his Marxist sympathies, which troubled the US and some members of Castro's 26 July Movement. While in Jakarta, Guevara visited Indonesian president Sukarno to discuss the revolution of 1945–1949 in Indonesia and establish trade relations. The two bonded, as Sukarno was attracted to Guevara's energy and relaxed approach; moreover they shared revolutionary leftist aspirations against Western imperialism. Guevara spent 15–27 July in Japan, participating in negotiations aimed at expanding Cuba's trade relations. He refused to visit and lay a wreath at Japan's Tomb of the Unknown Soldier commemorating soldiers lost during World War II, remarking that Japanese "imperialists" had "killed millions of Asians". Instead, Guevara visited Hiroshima, where the Americans had detonated an atomic bomb. Despite his denunciation of Imperial Japan, Guevara considered President Truman a "macabre clown" for the bombings, and after visiting the Hiroshima Peace Memorial Museum he sent a postcard to Cuba stating, "In order to fight better for peace, one must look at Hiroshima."

Upon Guevara's return to Cuba in September, it became evident Castro had more power. The government had seized land in accordance with the agrarian law, but was hedging on compensation offers to landowners, instead offering low-interest "bonds", a step which put the US on alert. The affected wealthy cattlemen of Camagüey mounted a campaign against land redistribution and enlisted disaffected rebel leader Huber Matos, who along with the anti-communist wing of the 26 July Movement, joined them in denouncing "communist encroachment". Dominican dictator Rafael Trujillo offered assistance to the "Anti-Communist Legion of the Caribbean" which was training in the Dominican Republic. This multi-national force, composed mostly of Spaniards and Cubans, and right-wing mercenaries, was plotting to topple Castro's regime.

Guevara acquired the additional position of Finance Minister, as well as President of the National Bank. These appointments, combined with his existing position as Minister of Industries, placed Guevara at the zenith of his power, as "virtual czar" of the economy. As a consequence of heading the central bank, it became Guevara's duty to sign the currency. He signed the bills "Che". It was through this symbolic act, which horrified many in finance, that Guevara signaled his distaste for money and the class distinctions it brought about. Guevara's long time friend Ricardo Rojo remarked that "the day he signed Che on the bills, (he) literally knocked the props from under the widespread belief that money was sacred."

International threats were heightened when, in March 1960, massive explosions ripped through the French freighter La Coubre carrying Belgian munitions from Antwerp, and docked in Havana Harbor. The blasts killed 76 people and injured hundreds, with Guevara personally providing first aid to victims. Castro accused the CIA of "an act of terrorism" and held a state funeral for the victims. At the memorial service Alberto Korda took the famous photograph of Guevara, now known as Guerrillero Heroico.

Perceived threats prompted Castro to eliminate more "counter-revolutionaries" and utilize Guevara to accelerate land reform. The National Institute of Agrarian Reform (INRA), was established to administer the new law. INRA became the most important governing body in Cuba, with Guevara at its head. Under Guevara, INRA established its own 100,000-person militia, to help the government seize control of land, supervise its distribution, and set up cooperative farms. The land confiscated included 480,000 acres (190,000 ha) owned by American corporations. In retaliation, US President Dwight D. Eisenhower reduced US imports of Cuban sugar (Cuba's main crop), which led Guevara on 10 July 1960 to address 100,000 workers in front of the Presidential Palace, to denounce US "economic aggression". Time Magazine reporters who met with Guevara described him as "guid(ing) Cuba with icy calculation, vast competence, high intelligence, and a perceptive sense of humor".

Guevara was like a father to me ... he educated me. He taught me to think. He taught me the most beautiful thing which is to be human.

— Urbano (a.k.a. Leonardo Tamayo),
fought with Guevara in Cuba and Bolivia

Guevara stressed the need for improvement in literacy. Before 1959 the literacy rate was 60-76%, with limited rural educational access and lack of instructors determining factors. The government at Guevara's behest dubbed 1961 the "year of education" and mobilized 100,000 volunteers into "literacy brigades", sent into the countryside to construct schools, train new educators, and teach the predominantly illiterate guajiros (peasants). Unlike many of Guevara's economic initiatives, this was "a remarkable success". By the completion of the Cuban literacy campaign, 707,212 adults had been taught to read and write, raising the literacy rate to 96%.

Guevara was concerned with establishing universal access to higher education. To accomplish this the new regime introduced affirmative action to the universities. While announcing this commitment, Guevara told the gathered faculty and students at the University of Las Villas that the days when education was "a privilege of the white middle class" had ended. "The University" he said, "must paint itself black, mulatto, worker, and peasant." If it did not, he warned, the people were going to break down its doors "and paint the University the colors they like."

=== Economic reforms and the "New Man" ===
In September 1960, when Guevara was asked about Cuba's ideology at the First Latin American Congress, he replied, "If I were asked whether our revolution is Communist, I would define it as Marxist. Our revolution has discovered by its methods the paths that Marx pointed out." When enacting and advocating policy, Guevara cited Karl Marx as his ideological inspiration. In defending his stance, Guevara confidently remarked, "There are truths so evident, so much a part of people's knowledge, that it is now useless to discuss them. One ought to be Marxist with the same naturalness with which one is 'Newtonian' in physics, or 'Pasteurian' in biology." According to Guevara, "practical revolutionaries" had the goal of "simply fulfill(ing) laws foreseen by Marx, the scientist." Using Marx's predictions and system of dialectical materialism, Guevara professed that "The laws of Marxism are present in the events of the Cuban Revolution, independently of what its leaders profess or fully know of those laws from a theoretical point of view."

The merit of Marx is that he suddenly produces a qualitative change in the history of social thought. He interprets history, understands its dynamic, predicts the future, but in addition to predicting it (which would satisfy his scientific obligation), he expresses a revolutionary concept: the world must not only be interpreted, it must be transformed. Man ceases to be the slave and tool of his environment and converts himself into the architect of his own destiny.

— Che Guevara, Notes for the Study of the Ideology of the Cuban, October 1960

Man truly achieves his full human condition when he produces without being compelled by the physical necessity of selling himself as a commodity.

— Che Guevara, Man and Socialism in Cuba

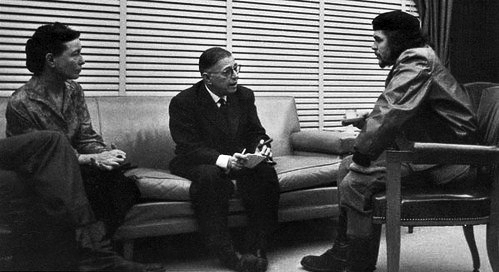
Guevara meeting with French existentialist philosophers Jean-Paul Sartre and Simone de Beauvoir at his office in Havana, March 1960. Sartre later wrote that Che was "the most complete human being of our time". In addition to Spanish, Guevara was fluent in French.

In an effort to eliminate social inequality, Guevara and Cuba's leadership had moved to transform the political and economic base of the country through nationalizing factories, banks, and businesses, while attempting to ensure affordable housing, healthcare, and full employment. In order for a genuine transformation of consciousness to take root, it was believed such structural changes had to be accompanied by a conversion in people's social relations and values. Believing that the attitudes in Cuba towards race, women, individualism, and manual labor were the product of the island's past, individuals were urged to view each other as equals and take on the values of what Guevara termed "el Hombre Nuevo", the New Man. Guevara hoped his "new man" to be "selfless and cooperative, obedient and hard working, gender-blind, incorruptible, non-materialistic, and anti-imperialist". Guevara emphasized the tenets of Marxism–Leninism, and wanted to use the state to emphasize qualities such as egalitarianism and self-sacrifice, at the same time as "unity, equality, and freedom" became the new maxims. Guevara's economic goal of the new man, which coincided with his aversion for wealth condensation and economic inequality, was to see elimination of material incentives in favor of moral ones. He viewed capitalism as a "contest among wolves" where "one can only win at the cost of others" and desired to see the creation of a "new man and woman". Guevara stressed that a socialist economy is not "worth the effort, sacrifice, and risks of war and destruction" if it ends up encouraging "greed and individual ambition at the expense of collective spirit". A goal of Guevara's thus became to reform "individual consciousness" and values to produce better citizens. In his view, Cuba's "new man" would overcome the "egotism" and "selfishness" that he loathed and characterised individuals in capitalist societies. To promote this "new man", the government created party-dominated institutions and mechanisms at all levels of society, which included organizations such as labor groups, youth leagues, women's groups, community centers, and houses of culture to promote state-sponsored art, music, and literature. Educational, mass media, and artistic community-based facilities were nationalized and utilized to instill the official socialist ideology. In describing this new method of "development", Guevara stated:

There is a great difference between free-enterprise development and revolutionary development. In one of them, wealth is concentrated in the hands of a fortunate few, the friends of the government, the best wheeler-dealers. In the other, wealth is the people's patrimony.

An integral part of fostering "unity between the individual and the mass", Guevara believed, was volunteer work. Guevara "led by example", working "endlessly at his ministry job, in construction, and even cutting sugar cane" on his day off. He was known for working 36 hours at a stretch, calling meetings after midnight, and eating on the run. Such behavior was emblematic of Guevara's program of moral incentives, where each worker was required to meet a quota and produce a certain quantity of goods. As a replacement for the pay increases abolished by Guevara, workers who exceeded their quota now only received a certificate of commendation, while workers who failed to meet their quotas were given a pay cut. Guevara unapologetically defended his philosophy towards motivation and work, stating:

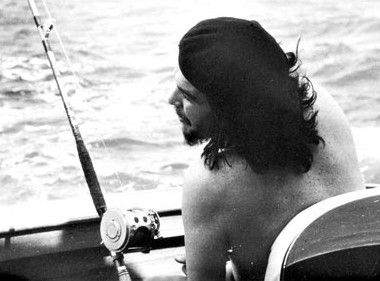
Guevara fishing off the coast of Havana, on 15 May 1960. Along with Castro, Guevara competed with expatriate author Ernest Hemingway at what was known as the "Hemingway Fishing Contest".

This is not a matter of how many pounds of meat one might be able to eat, or how many times a year someone can go to the beach, or how many ornaments from abroad one might be able to buy with his current salary. What really matters is that the individual feels more complete, with much more internal richness and much more responsibility.

In 1960, Guevara ordered the construction of the Guanahacabibes camp: a labor camp to "rehabilitate" his employees who had committed infractions at work. Historians have had difficulty characterizing the camp, because it was extra-legal and thus poorly documented. There is a consensus that employees worked to regain their employment after a negative incident, and were under no legal pressure to work at the camp. However, historian Rachel Hynson has theorized that other poorly documented "Guanahacabibes" camps also existed, that were more brutal and legally binding.

With the loss of commercial connections with Western states, Guevara tried to replace them with commercial relationships with Eastern Bloc states, visiting Marxist states and signing trade agreements. At the end of 1960 he visited Czechoslovakia, the Soviet Union, North Korea, Hungary, and East Germany and signed a trade agreement in East Berlin. Such agreements helped Cuba's economy but had the disadvantage of a growing economic dependency on the Eastern Bloc. It was in East Germany where Guevara met Tamara Bunke, who was assigned as his interpreter, and who joined him years later, and was killed with him in Bolivia.

His programs were unsuccessful, and accompanied a drop in productivity and rise in absenteeism. In a meeting with economist René Dumont, Guevara blamed the inadequacy of agrarian reform, which turned plantations into farm cooperatives or split up land amongst peasants. In Guevara's opinion, this situation continued to promote a "heightened sense of individual ownership" in which workers could not see the positive social benefits of their labor, leading them to seek individual material gain as before. Che's former deputy Ernesto Betancourt, subsequently the director of the US government-funded Radio Martí and an ally turned Castro-critic, accused Guevara of being "ignorant of the most elementary economic principles."

=== Bay of Pigs and Four Year Plan ===
In 1960, Guevara began promoting the idea of industrializing Cuba, and diversifying Cuba's agriculture. In 1961, Guevara proposed a four-year plan for rapid industrialization that would create a 15% annual growth rate, and tenfold increase in fruit production. As head of the Ministry of Industries, Guevara announced on March 3 that "accelerated industrialization" would require the centralization of all economic decision making.

On 17 April 1961, 1,400 US-trained Cuban exiles invaded Cuba during the Bay of Pigs Invasion. Guevara did not play a key role, as the day before the invasion a warship carrying Marines faked an invasion off the West Coast of Pinar del Río and drew forces commanded by Guevara. However, historians give him a share of credit for the victory as he was director of instruction for Cuba's armed forces. Author Tad Szulc in his explanation of the Cuban victory, assigns Guevara partial credit, stating: "The revolutionaries won because Che Guevara, as the head of the Instruction Department of the Revolutionary Armed Forces in charge of the militia training program, had done so well in preparing 200,000 men and women for war." It was during this deployment he suffered a bullet grazing to the cheek when his pistol fell out of its holster and accidentally discharged.

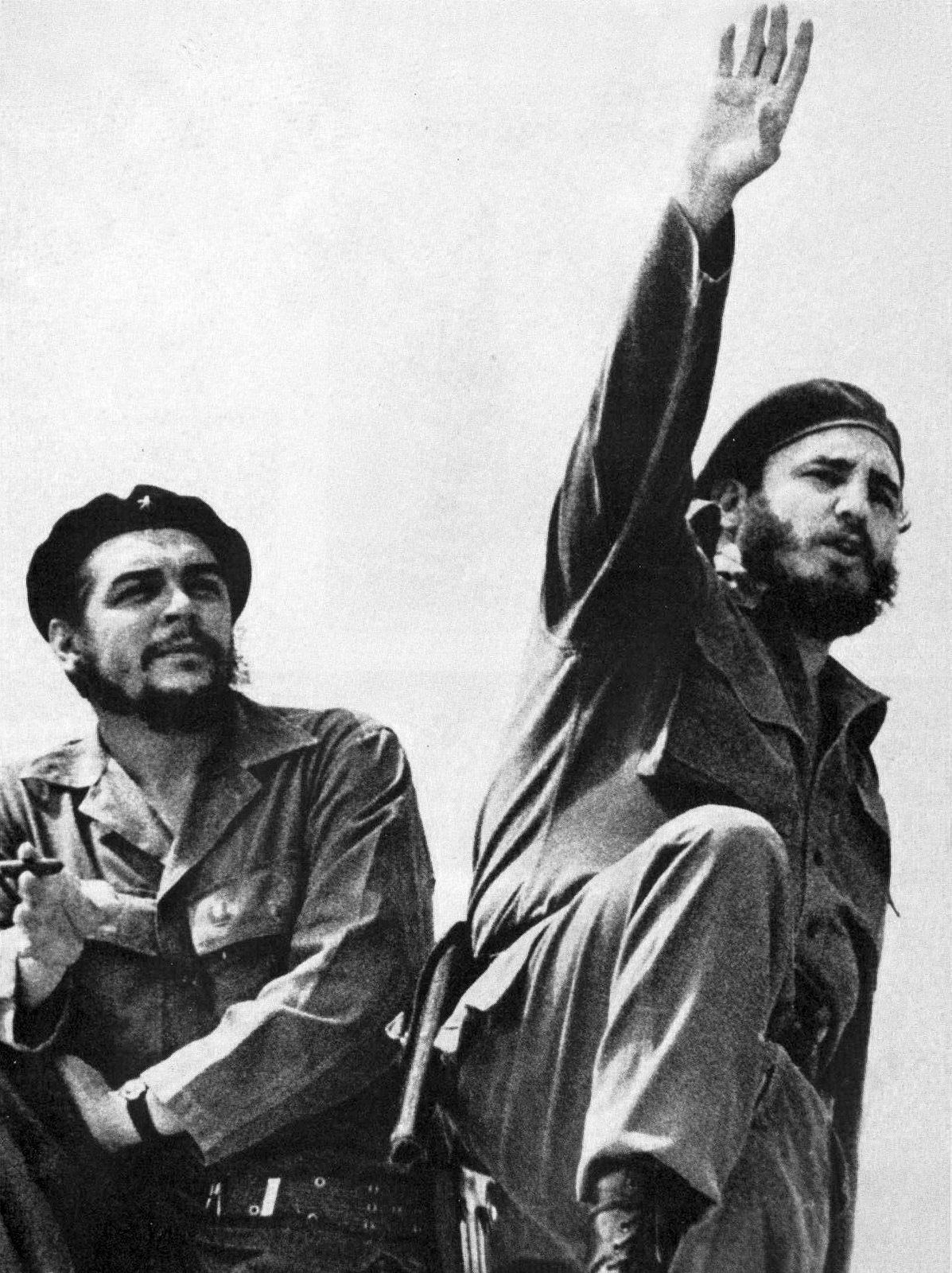
Guevara (left) and Fidel Castro, photographed by Alberto Korda in 1961

In August 1961, during an economic conference of the Organization of American States in Punta del Este, Uruguay, Guevara sent a note of "gratitude" to US President John F. Kennedy through Richard N. Goodwin, Deputy Assistant Secretary of State for Inter-American Affairs. It read "Thanks for Playa Girón (Bay of Pigs). Before the invasion, the revolution was shaky. Now it's stronger than ever." In response to US Treasury Secretary Douglas Dillon presenting the Alliance for Progress for ratification by the meeting, Guevara antagonistically attacked the United States' claim of being a "democracy", stating that such a system was not compatible with "financial oligarchy, discrimination against blacks, and outrages by the Ku Klux Klan". Guevara continued, speaking out against the "persecution" that in his view "drove scientists like Oppenheimer from their posts, deprived the world for years of the marvelous voice of Paul Robeson, and sent the Rosenbergs to their deaths against the protests of a shocked world." Guevara ended his remarks by insinuating that the US was not interested in reform, sardonically quipping that "U.S. experts never talk about agrarian reform; they prefer a safe subject, like a better water supply. In short, they seem to prepare the revolution of the toilets." Nevertheless, Goodwin stated in a memo to Kennedy following the meeting that Guevara viewed him as someone of the "newer generation" and that Guevara, whom Goodwin alleged sent a message to him after the meeting through one of the meeting's Argentine participants whom he described as "Darretta", also viewed the conversation as "quite profitable".

Guevara was a member of JUCEPLAN, the central planning board of Cuba, while head of the Ministry of Industries. The head of JUCEPLAN, Regino Boti, announced in August 1961 that the country would soon have 10% growth, and throughout 1961, Marxist economists from throughout the world were invited to Cuba to assist in economic planning. The four-year plan drafted by JUCEPLAN in 1961 stressed industrialization and agricultural diversification, minimizing sugar production. This plan was devised to be implemented in 1962 through 1965.

=== Great Debate and Missile Crisis ===
In March 1962, Guevara admitted in a speech that the economic plan was a failure, stating it was "an absurd plan, disconnected from reality, with absurd goals and imaginary resources." The failure had impacts by 1962, Cuba introduced a rationing system for food.

Fidel Castro invited Marxist economists to debate two propositions. One proposed by Guevara was that Cuba could bypass capitalist, then "socialist" transition period, and immediately become an industrialized "communist" society if "subjective conditions" like public consciousness and vanguard action are perfected. The other proposition held by the Popular Socialist Party was that Cuba required a transitionary period as a mixed economy in which Cuba's sugar economy was maximized for profit before a "communist" society could be established.

Guevara elaborated that moral incentives should exist as the main motivator to increase workers' production. All profits were to be given to the state budget, and the state would cover losses. Institutions that developed socialist consciousness were regarded as the most important element in maintaining a path to socialism, rather than materially incentivized increases in production. Implementation of the profit-motive was regarded as a path towards capitalism and one of the flaws of the Eastern bloc economies. The economy would rely on mass mobilizations and centralized planning as a method for development. The main ideal that compromised the consciousness that would develop socialism was the praise of the "new man", a citizen that was only motivated by solidarity and self-sacrifice.

Guevara served as the main architect of the Cuban–Soviet relationship, and played a key role in bringing to Cuba the Soviet nuclear-armed ballistic missiles that precipitated the Cuban Missile Crisis in October 1962 and brought the world to the brink of nuclear war. After the Soviets proposed basing nuclear missiles in Cuba it was Guevara who traveled to the Soviet Union in August 1962, to sign off on the agreement. Guevara argued with Khruschev that the missile deal should be made public but Khruschev insisted on secrecy, and swore the Soviet Union's support if the Americans discovered the missiles. By the time Guevara arrived in Cuba the US had discovered Soviet troops in Cuba via U-2 spy planes.

A few weeks after the crisis, during an interview with the British communist newspaper the Daily Worker, Guevara was still fuming over the perceived Soviet betrayal and said that, if the missiles had been under Cuban control, they would have fired them off. While expounding on the incident later, Guevara reiterated that the cause of socialist liberation against "imperialist aggression" would have been worth the possibility of "millions of atomic war victims". The missile crisis further convinced Guevara that the world's two superpowers (the US and Soviet Union) used Cuba as a pawn in their global strategies. Afterward, he denounced the Soviets almost as frequently as the Americans.

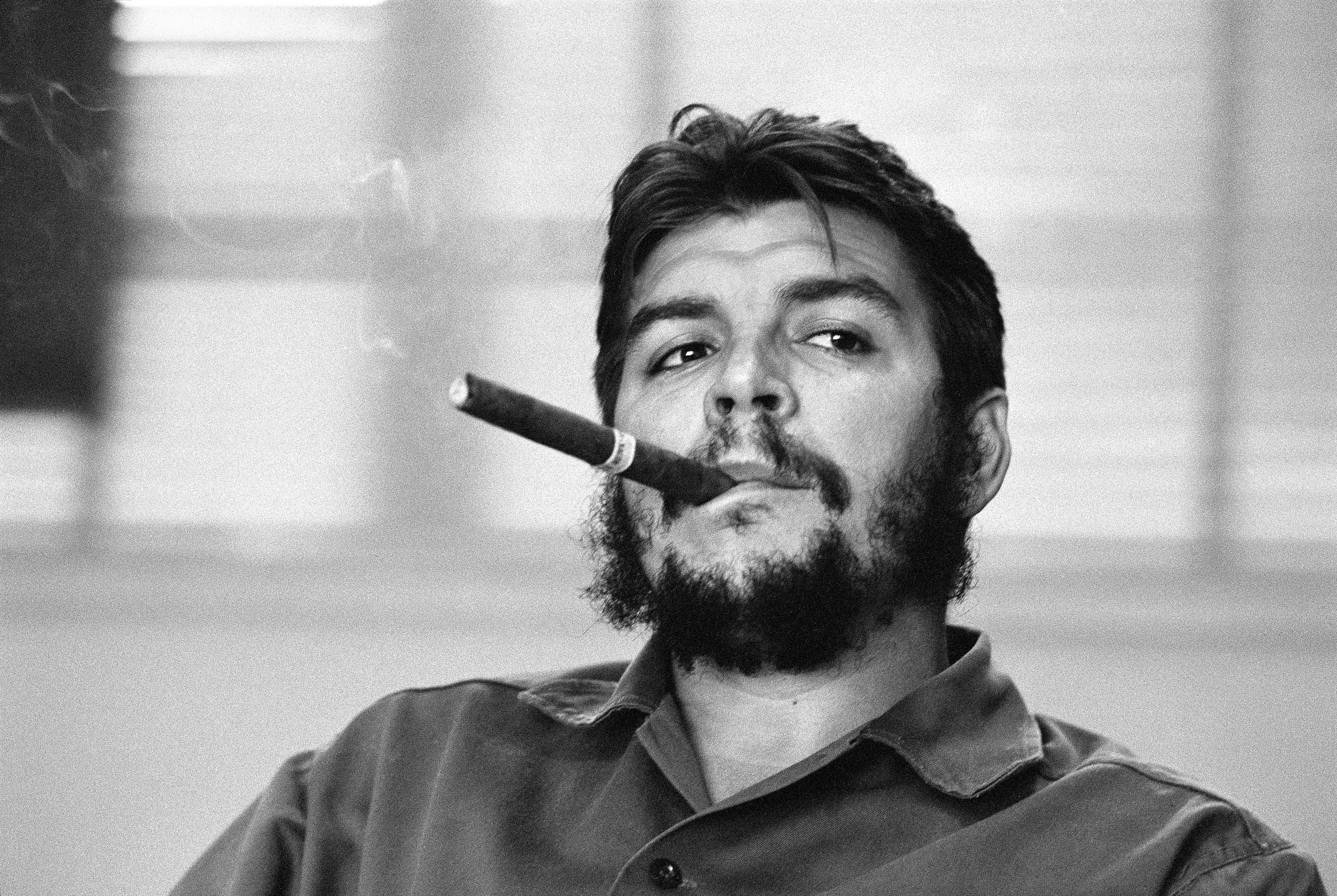
Che Guevara in his office as Minister of Industry (in the Hotel Riviera), while being interviewed by Laura Berquist for Look magazine. (1963)

Economic decline in Cuba continued past 1962, in the next year, sugar production was down by over a third from its 1961 level. The sugar harvest of 1963 only brought in 3.8 million tons, the lowest harvest in Cuba in over twenty years. Food production was down per capita by 40% for the next three years. Castro began to emphasize sugar production in economic planning. Guevara resigned as head of Ministry of Industries.

In February 1963, Guevara published the essay Against bureaucratism, in which he describes the "guerrillaism" of the Cuban leadership, the necessity of bureaucratization to prevent rash decision-making amongst ex-guerrillas, and the need to de-bureaucratize to end idleness in production. Since his essay, the word "Guerrillerismo" from his essay, has been used by historians to refer to a style of rhetoric that developed in Cuba, that constantly linked government decisions to the guerrilla struggle of the Cuban Revolution, implying they are all part of the same struggle.

In 1964, Guevara published an article, The Cuban Economy: Its Past, and Its Present Importance, which analyzed the failure of Guevara's economic plans. Guevara stated that he committed "two principle errors": the diversification of agriculture, and dispersing resources evenly for various agricultural sectors. Guevara states:

The entire economic history of Cuba had demonstrated that no other agricultural activity would give such returns as those yielded by the cultivation of the sugarcane. At the outset of the Revolution many of us were not aware of this basic economic fact, because a fetishistic idea connected sugar with our dependence on imperialism and with the misery in the rural areas, without analysing the real causes: the relation to the uneven trade balance.

== International diplomacy ==
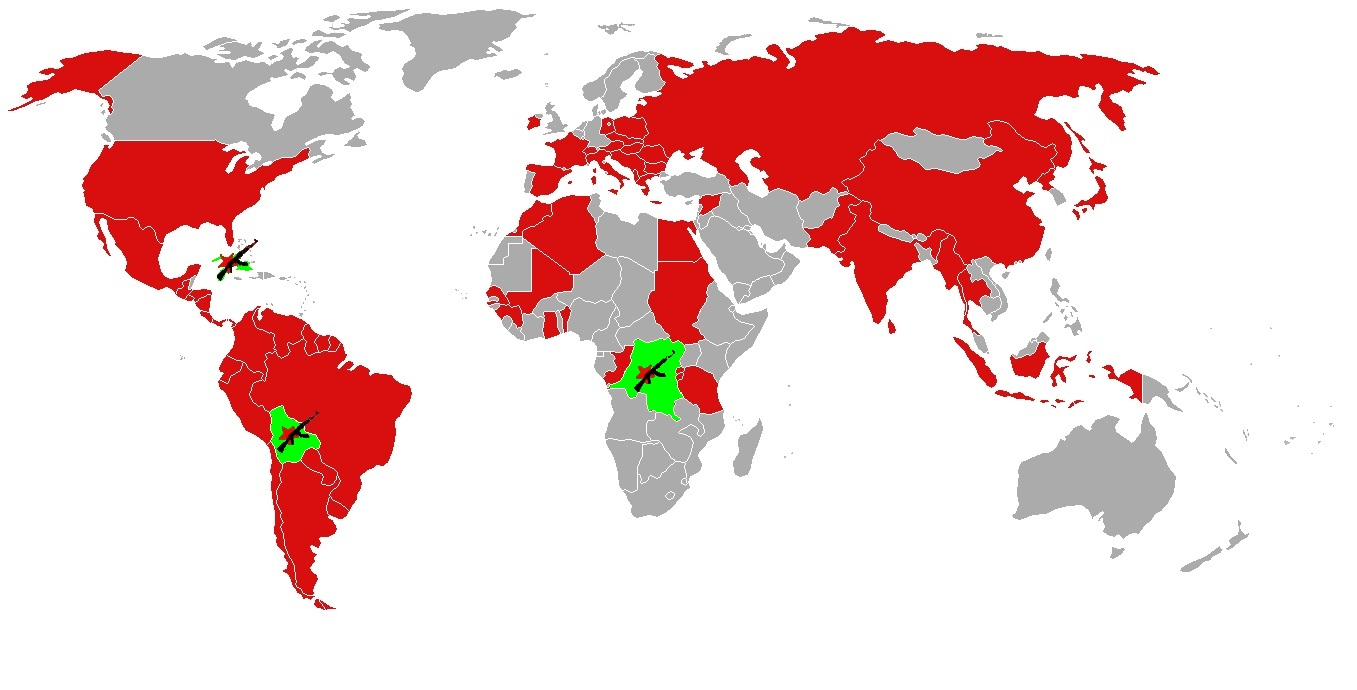
Countries Che Guevara: visited participated in armed revolution

=== United Nations delegation ===
By December 1964, Guevara had emerged as a "revolutionary statesman of world stature" and traveled to New York as head of the Cuban delegation to speak at the UN. On 11 December, during Guevara's hour-long, impassioned address at the UN, he criticized the United Nations' inability to confront the "brutal policy of apartheid" in South Africa, asking "Can the United Nations do nothing to stop this?". Guevara then denounced the United States policy towards their black population, stating:

Those who kill their own children and discriminate daily against them because of the color of their skin; those who let the murderers of blacks remain free, protecting them, and furthermore punishing the black population because they demand their legitimate rights as free men—how can those who do this consider themselves guardians of freedom?

An indignant Guevara ended his speech by reciting the Second Declaration of Havana, decreeing Latin America a "family of 200 million brothers who suffer the same miseries". This "epic", Guevara declared, would be written by the "hungry Indian masses, peasants without land, exploited workers, and progressive masses". To Guevara the conflict was a struggle of masses and ideas, which would be carried forth by those "mistreated and scorned by imperialism" who were previously considered "a weak and submissive flock". With this "flock", Guevara now asserted, "Yankee monopoly capitalism" now terrifyingly saw their "gravediggers". It would be during this "hour of vindication", Guevara pronounced, that the "anonymous mass" would begin to write its history "with its own blood" and reclaim those "rights that were laughed at by one and all for 500 years". Guevara closed his remarks by hypothesizing that this "wave of anger" would "sweep the lands of Latin America" and that the labor masses who "turn the wheel of history" were now, for the first time, "awakening from the long, brutalizing sleep to which they had been subjected".

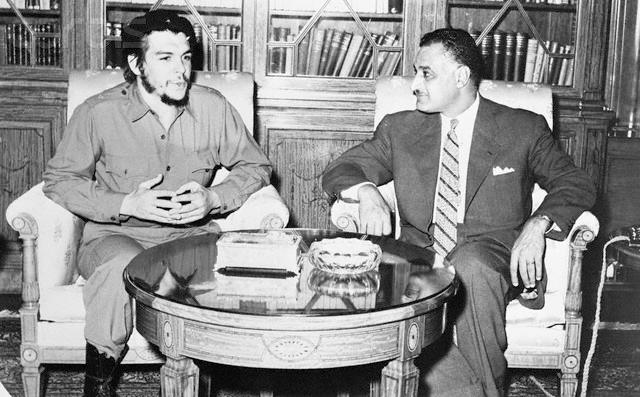
Meeting Egyptian President Gamal Abdel Nasser in Cairo, 1964

Guevara later learned there had been two failed attempts on his life by Cuban exiles during his stop at the UN complex. The first from Molly Gonzales, who tried to break through barricades with a seven-inch hunting knife, and the second by Guillermo Novo, who fired a timer-initiated bazooka from a boat in the East River at the UN Headquarters during his address, but was off target. Afterwards Guevara commented that "it is better to be killed by a woman with a knife than by a man with a gun", while adding with a languid wave of his cigar that the explosion had "given the whole thing more flavor".

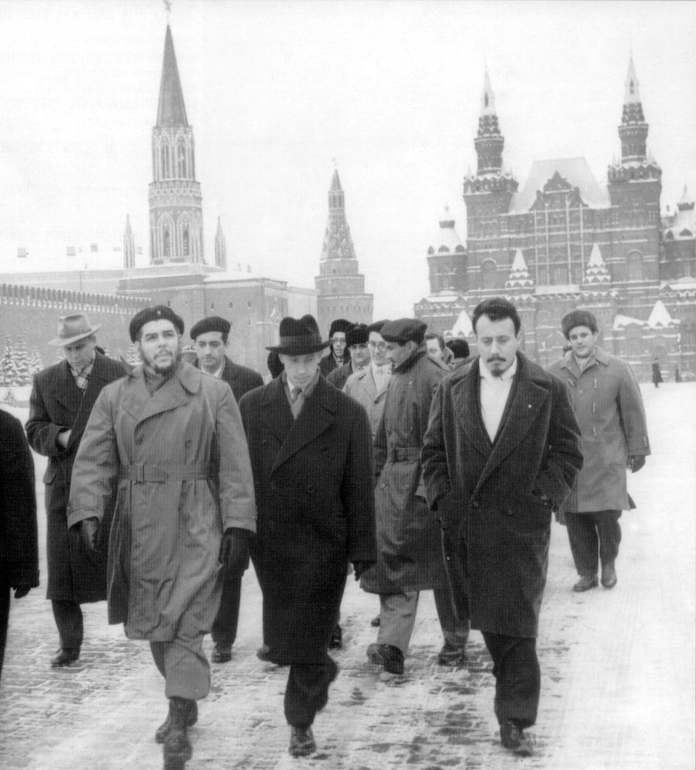
Walking through Red Square in Moscow, November 1964

While in New York, Guevara appeared on the CBS news program Face the Nation, and met with a range of people, from US Senator Eugene McCarthy to associates of Malcolm X. The latter expressed his admiration, declaring Guevara "one of the most revolutionary men in this country right now" while reading a statement from him to a crowd at the Audubon Ballroom.

=== World travel ===
On 17 December, Guevara left New York for Paris, and embarked on a three-month world tour that included visits to China, North Korea, the United Arab Republic, Algeria, Ghana, Guinea, Mali, Dahomey, Congo-Brazzaville, and Tanzania, with stops in Ireland and Prague. While in Ireland, Guevara embraced his Irish heritage, celebrating Saint Patrick's Day in Limerick. He wrote to his father, humorously stating "I am in this green Ireland of your ancestors. When they found out, the television [station] came to ask me about the Lynch genealogy, but in case they were horse thieves or something like that, I didn't say much."

During Guevara's time in Algeria, he was interviewed by poet Juan Goytisolo inside the Cuban embassy. During the interview, Guevara noticed a book by openly gay Cuban writer Virgilio Piñera sitting on the table next to him. He threw the book against the wall and yelled "how dare you have in our embassy a book by this foul faggot?" This moment was a turn in Goytisolo's identity as it influenced him to slowly come out of the closet as gay and begin to sympathize with the LGBT citizens of Cuba.

During this voyage, he wrote a letter to Carlos Quijano, editor of a Uruguayan weekly, which was later retitled Socialism and Man in Cuba. Outlined in the treatise was Guevara's summons for the creation of a new consciousness, a new status of work, and a new role of the individual. He laid out the reasoning behind his anti-capitalist sentiments, stating:

The laws of capitalism, blind and invisible to the majority, act upon the individual without his thinking about it. He sees only the vastness of a seemingly infinite horizon before him. That is how it is painted by capitalist propagandists, who purport to draw a lesson from the example of Rockefeller—whether or not it is true—about the possibilities of success. The amount of poverty and suffering required for the emergence of a Rockefeller, and the amount of depravity that the accumulation of a fortune of such magnitude entails, are left out of the picture, and it is not always possible to make the people in general see this.

Guevara ended the essay by declaring that "the true revolutionary is guided by a great feeling of love" and beckoning on all revolutionaries to "strive every day so that this love of living humanity will be transformed into acts that serve as examples", thus becoming "a moving force". The genesis for Guevara's assertions relied on the fact that he believed the example of the Cuban Revolution was "something spiritual that would transcend all borders".

=== Visit to Algeria and political turn ===
In Algiers, on 24 February 1965, Guevara made what turned out to be his last public appearance on the international stage when he delivered a speech at an economic seminar on Afro-Asian solidarity. He specified the moral duty of the socialist countries, accusing them of tacit complicity with the exploiting Western countries. He proceeded to outline measures which he said communist bloc countries must implement to accomplish the defeat of imperialism. Having criticized the Soviet Union (the primary financial backer of Cuba) in such a public manner, he returned to Cuba on 14 March to a solemn reception by Fidel and Raúl Castro, Osvaldo Dorticós, and Carlos Rafael Rodríguez at Havana airport.

As revealed in his speech, Guevara had come to view the Northern Hemisphere, led by the US in the West and Soviet Union in the East, as the exploiter of the Southern Hemisphere. He strongly supported communist North Vietnam in the Vietnam War, and urged the peoples of other developing countries to take up arms and create "many Vietnams". Che's denunciations of the Soviets made him popular among intellectuals and artists of the Western European left who had lost faith in the Soviet Union, while his condemnation of imperialism and call to revolution inspired radical students in the US, who were impatient for change.

Marx characterized the psychological or philosophical manifestation of capitalist social relations as alienation and antagonism; the result of the commodification of labor and the operation of the law of value. For Guevara, the challenge was to replace the individuals' alienation from the productive process, and the antagonism generated by class relations, with integration and solidarity, developing a collective attitude to production and the concept of work as a social duty.

— Helen Yaffe, author of Che Guevara: The Economics of Revolution

In Guevara's private writings, he displays his growing criticism of the Soviet political economy, believing that the Soviets had "forgotten Marx". This led Guevara to denounce several Soviet practices including what he saw as their attempt to "air-brush the inherent violence of class struggle integral to the transition from capitalism to socialism", their "dangerous" policy of peaceful co-existence with the US, their failure to push for a "change in consciousness" towards the idea of work, and their attempt to "liberalize" the socialist economy. Guevara wanted the complete elimination of money, interest, commodity production, the market economy, and "mercantile relationships": all conditions that the Soviets argued would only disappear when world communism was achieved. Disagreeing with this incrementalist approach, Guevara criticized the Soviet Manual of Political Economy, predicting that if the Soviets did not abolish the law of value, it would eventually return to capitalism.

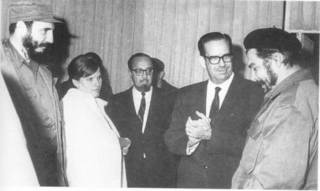
Guevara returning to Cuba at Rancho Boyeros airport on 14 March 1965. He is received by (left to right) Fidel Castro, Aleida March, Carlos Rafael Rodriguez, and Osvaldo Dorticos.

Two weeks after his Algiers speech and return to Cuba, Guevara dropped out of public life and vanished altogether. His whereabouts were a mystery in Cuba, as he was second in power to Castro. His disappearance was attributed to the failure of the Cuban industrialization scheme he had advocated, pressure exerted on Castro by Soviet officials who disapproved of Guevara's pro-Chinese communist stance on the Sino-Soviet split, and serious differences between Guevara and the pragmatic Castro regarding Cuba's economic development and ideological line. Pressed by international speculation regarding Guevara's fate, Castro stated in June 1965, that the people would be informed when Guevara wished to let them know. Still, rumors spread inside and outside Cuba concerning Guevara's whereabouts.

There are rumors from retired Cuban officials who were around the Castro brothers that the brothers and Guevara had a strong disagreement after Guevara's Algiers speech. Intelligence files from the East German embassy in Cuba detail heated exchanges between Castro and Guevara after Guevara's return from Africa. Whether Castro disagreed with Guevara's criticisms of the Soviet Union or just found them unproductive to express on the world stage remains unclear.

On 3 October, Castro publicly revealed a three-page, undated letter purportedly written to him by Guevara around seven months earlier, later titled Guevara's "farewell letter". In it, Guevara reaffirmed his enduring solidarity with the Revolution but declared his intention to leave Cuba to fight for the revolutionary cause abroad. He resigned from all his positions in the government and communist party, and renounced his honorary Cuban citizenship.

== Congo Crisis ==
=== Military involvement ===
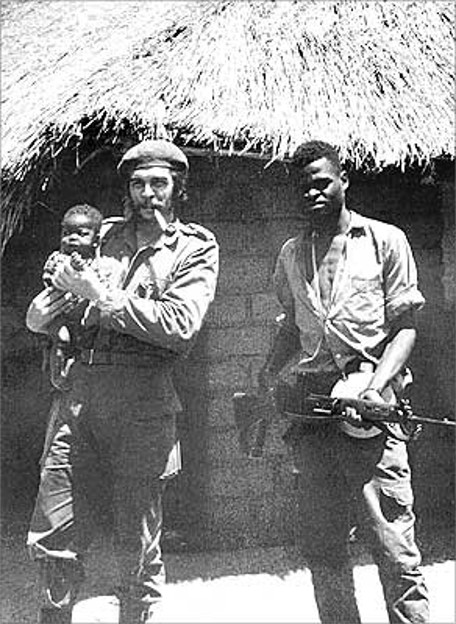
37-year-old Guevara, holding a Congolese baby and standing with a fellow Afro-Cuban soldier in the Congo Crisis, 1965

I tried to make them understand that the real issue was not the liberation of any given state, but a common war against the common master, who was one and the same in Mozambique and in Malawi, in Rhodesia and in South Africa, in the Congo and in Angola, but not one of them agreed.

— Che Guevara, in February 1965, after meeting with various African liberation movement leaders in Dar es Salaam, Tanzania

In early 1965, Guevara went to Africa to offer his knowledge and experience as a guerrilla to resolve the Congo Crisis. According to Algerian President Ahmed Ben Bella, Guevara thought Africa was imperialism's weak link and had enormous revolutionary potential. Egyptian President Gamal Abdel Nasser, who had fraternal relations with Che since his 1959 visit, saw Guevara's plan to fight in Congo as "unwise" and warned that he would become a "Tarzan" figure, doomed to failure. Despite the warning, Guevara traveled to Congo using the alias Ramón Benítez. He led the Cuban operation in support of the leftist Simba movement, which had emerged from the Congo conflict. Guevara, his second-in-command Víctor Dreke, and 12 other Cuban expeditionaries arrived in Congo on 24 April, and a contingent of 100 Afro-Cubans joined them soon afterward. They collaborated with guerrilla leader Laurent-Désiré Kabila, who had helped supporters of the overthrown prime minister Patrice Lumumba to lead an unsuccessful revolt months earlier. As an admirer of the late Lumumba, Guevara declared that his "murder should be a lesson for all of us". Guevara, with limited knowledge of Swahili and local languages, was assigned a teenage interpreter, Freddy Ilanga. Over the course of seven months, Ilanga grew to "admire the hard-working Guevara", who "showed the same respect to black people as he did to whites". Guevara soon became disillusioned with the poor discipline of Kabila's troops and dismissed him, stating "nothing leads me to believe he is the man of the hour". Regardless, Che still regarded Kabila more favorably than other Simba leaders, several of whom still pretended to lead rebel forces even after they had fled into exile.

As an additional obstacle, the Congolese military (the Armée Nationale Congolaise, ANC) was aided by mercenary troops led by Mike Hoare and supported by anti-Castro Cuban pilots and the CIA. These forces thwarted Guevara's movements from his base camp in the mountains near the village of Fizi, on Lake Tanganyika, in southeast Congo. They were able to monitor his communications and so pre-empted his attacks and interdicted his supply lines. Although Guevara tried to conceal his presence, the US government knew his location and activities. The National Security Agency was intercepting all his incoming and outgoing transmissions via equipment aboard the USNS Private Jose F. Valdez, a floating listening post that cruised the Indian Ocean for that purpose. After becoming aware of the Communist Cubans' presence in eastern Congo, Hoare planned his strategies to counter their guerrilla tactics.

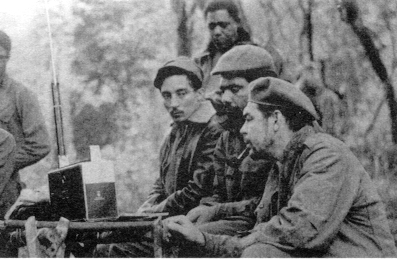
Listening to a Zenith Trans-Oceanic shortwave radio receiver are (seated from the left) Rogelio Oliva, José María Martínez Tamayo (known as "Mbili" in the Congo and "Ricardo" in Bolivia), and Guevara. Standing behind them is Roberto Sánchez ("Lawton" in Cuba and "Changa" in the Congo), 1965.

Guevara's aim was to export the revolution by instructing local anti-Mobutu Simba fighters in Marxist ideology and foco theory strategies of guerrilla warfare. In his Congo Diary book, he cites a combination of incompetence, intransigence, and infighting among the Congolese rebels as reasons for the revolt's failure. On 27 September 1965, the ANC and its allies launched Operation South to destroy Kabila's forces. With the support of Che and his Cubans, the Simbas put up substantial resistance. Regardless, the rebels were increasingly pushed back, lost their supply routes, and suffered under failing morale. Guevara was almost killed in one clash. He wanted to continue a guerrilla campaign from the mountains, but even his Simba allies told him the rebellion was defeated. On 20 November, suffering from dysentery and acute asthma, and disheartened after seven months of defeats and inactivity, Guevara left Congo with the six Cuban survivors of his 12-man column. Guevara stated that he had planned to send the wounded back to Cuba and fight in the Congo alone until his death, as a revolutionary example. But after being urged by his comrades, and two Cuban emissaries sent by Castro, he agreed to leave Africa. Guevara's forces took down their base camp, burned their huts, and destroyed or threw weapons into Lake Tanganyika that they could not take with them, before crossing the border by boat into Tanzania at night and traveling to Dar es Salaam. In speaking about his experience months later, Guevara concluded that he left rather than fight to the death because: "The human element failed. There is no will to fight. The [rebel] leaders are corrupt. In a word ... there was nothing to do." Guevara declared that "we can not liberate, all by ourselves, a country that does not want to fight." A few weeks later, he wrote the preface to the diary he kept during the Congo venture, that began: "This is the story of a failure."

=== Flight from the Congo ===
Map of the Operation South which forced Che Guevara to flee Congo

Following the failure in the Congo, Guevara was reluctant to return to Cuba, because Castro had made public Guevara's "farewell letter"—intended to only be revealed in the case of his death—wherein he severed all ties to devote himself to revolution throughout the world. Guevara spent the next six months living clandestinely at the Cuban embassy in Dar es Salaam and a Cuban safehouse in Ládví near Prague. While in Europe, Guevara made a secret visit to former Argentine president Juan Perón, who lived in exile in Francoist Spain, where he confided in Perón about his plan to foment a communist revolution to bring all of Latin America under socialist control. Perón warned Guevara that his plan for a revolution throughout Latin America, starting with Bolivia, would be suicidal and futile, but Guevara's mind was already made up. Later, Perón remarked that Guevara was "an immature utopian... but one of us. I am happy for it to be so because he is giving the Yankees a real headache."

Guevara compiled his memoirs of the Congo experience and wrote drafts of two more books, one on philosophy and another on economics. As Guevara prepared for Bolivia, he secretly traveled back to Cuba on 21 July 1966 to visit Castro, as well as to see his wife and write a last letter to his five children to be read upon his death, which ended with him instructing them:

Above all, always be capable of feeling deeply any injustice committed against anyone, anywhere in the world. This is the most beautiful quality in a revolutionary.

== Bolivian insurgency ==
=== Departure to Bolivia ===
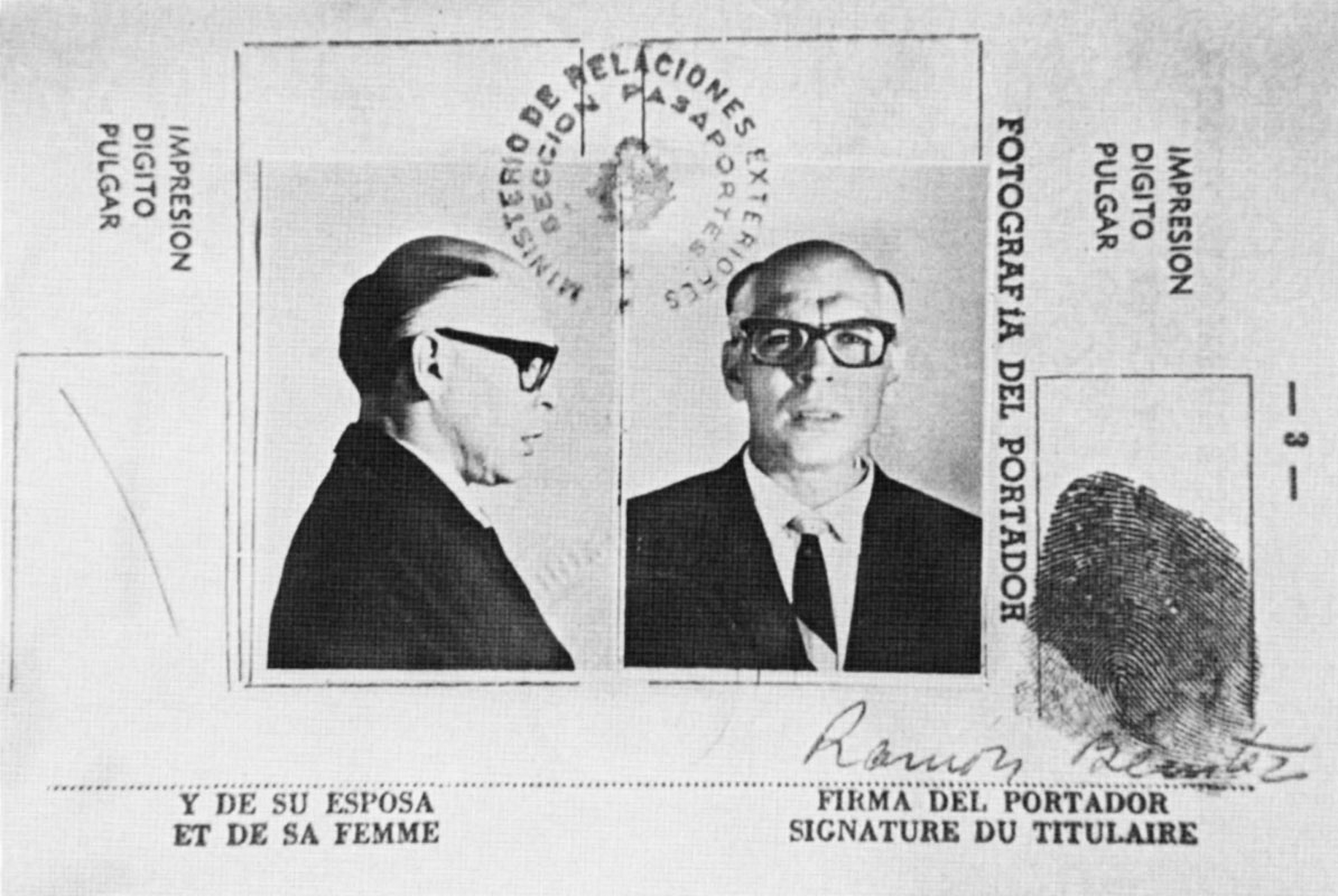
Guevara's 1966 passport featuring him in disguise with a false name

In late 1966, Guevara's location was still not public knowledge, although representatives of Mozambique's independence movement, the FRELIMO, reported that they met with Guevara in Dar es Salaam regarding his offer to aid in their revolutionary project, an offer which they rejected. In a speech at the 1967 International Workers' Day rally in Havana, the acting minister of the armed forces, Major Juan Almeida Bosque, announced that Guevara was "serving the revolution somewhere in Latin America". In his book Opération Condor published in 2020, journalist Pablo Daniel Magee reconstitutes the first incursion of Guevara in Bolivia on 3 October 1966, based on top-secret documents kept in the UNESCO protected Archives of Terror in Paraguay.

Before he departed for Bolivia, Guevara altered his appearance by shaving off his beard and much of his hair, dying it grey so that he was unrecognizable as Che Guevara. On 3 November, Guevara secretly arrived in La Paz on a flight from Montevideo, under the false name Adolfo Mena González, posing as a middle-aged Uruguayan businessman working for the Organization of American States.

Three days after his arrival, Guevara left La Paz for the rural south east to form his guerrilla army. Guevara's first base camp was located in the montane dry forest in the remote Ñancahuazú region. Training in the Ñancahuazú valley proved to be hazardous, and little was accomplished in building an army. The Argentine-born East German operative Tamara Bunke, better known by her nom de guerre "Tania", had been installed as Che's primary agent in La Paz.

=== Ñancahuazú Guerrilla ===
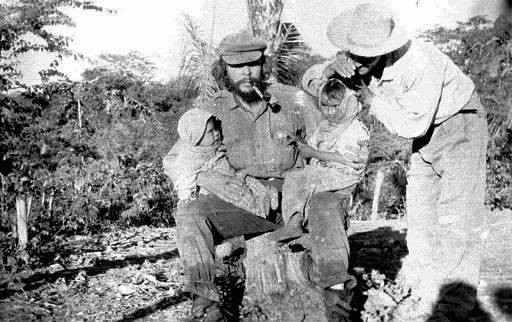
Guevara in rural Bolivia, shortly before his death (1967)

Guevara's guerrilla force, numbering about 50 and operating as the ELN (Ejército de Liberación Nacional de Bolivia, "National Liberation Army of Bolivia"), was well equipped and scored successes against Bolivian army regulars in the difficult terrain of the mountainous Camiri region during early 1967. As a result of Guevara's units winning skirmishes in the spring and summer of 1967, the Bolivian government began to overestimate the size of the guerrilla force.

Researchers hypothesize that Guevara's plan for fomenting a revolution in Bolivia failed for an array of reasons:

- Guevara had expected assistance and cooperation from local dissidents that he did not receive, nor did he receive support from the Communist Party of Bolivia under the leadership of Mario Monje, which was oriented toward Moscow rather than Havana. In Guevara's diary, he wrote about Bolivia's Communist Party, which he characterized as "distrustful, disloyal and stupid".
- He had expected to deal only with the Bolivian military, who were poorly trained and equipped, and was unaware the US had sent a team of the CIA Special Activities Division commandos and other operatives to aid the anti-insurrection effort. The Bolivian Army was trained, advised, and supplied by US Army Special Forces, including an elite battalion of US Rangers trained in jungle warfare that set up camp in La Esperanza, a small settlement close to the guerrillas.
- He had expected to remain in radio contact with Havana. The shortwave radio transmitters provided to him by Cuba were faulty. Thus, the guerrillas were unable to communicate and be resupplied, leaving them isolated and stranded.

Guevara's preference for confrontation rather than compromise, which had surfaced during his guerrilla campaign in Cuba, contributed to his inability to develop successful working relationships with rebel leaders, just as it had in the Congo. This tendency had existed in Cuba, but had been kept in check by the timely interventions and guidance of Castro. The result was that Guevara was unable to attract inhabitants of the local area to join his militia. Many inhabitants willingly informed the Bolivian authorities and military about the guerrillas and their movements. Guevara wrote in his diary: "Talking to these peasants is like talking to statues. They do not give us any help. Worse still, many of them are turning into informants."

Félix Rodríguez, a Cuban exile turned CIA Special Activities Division operative, advised Bolivian troops during the hunt for Guevara. The 2007 documentary My Enemy's Enemy alleges that Nazi war criminal Klaus Barbie possibly helped the CIA orchestrate Guevara's eventual capture.

=== Capture ===
On 7 October 1967, an informant apprised the Bolivian Special Forces of the location of Guevara's guerrilla encampment in the Yuro ravine. On the morning of 8 October, they encircled the area with two companies numbering 180 soldiers and advanced, triggering a battle where Guevara was wounded and taken prisoner while leading a detachment with Simeon Cuba Sarabia. Guevara's biographer Jon Lee Anderson reports Bolivian Sergeant Bernardino Huanca's account: that as the Bolivian Rangers approached, a twice-wounded Guevara, his gun rendered useless, threw up his arms in surrender and shouted to the soldiers: "Do not shoot! I am Che Guevara and I am worth more to you alive than dead."

Guevara was tied up and taken to a dilapidated mud schoolhouse in the village of La Higuera on the evening of 8 October. For the next half-day, Guevara refused to be interrogated by Bolivian officers and only spoke quietly to Bolivian soldiers. One of those soldiers, a helicopter pilot named Jaime Niño de Guzmán, describes Che as looking "dreadful". According to Niño de Guzmán, Guevara was shot through the right calf, his hair was matted with dirt, his clothes were shredded, and his feet were covered in rough leather sheaths. Despite his haggard appearance, he recounts that "Che held his head high, looked everyone straight in the eyes and asked only for something to smoke." Niño de Guzmán states that he "took pity" and gave him a bag of tobacco for his pipe, and that Guevara smiled and thanked him. On the night of 8 October, Guevara—despite having his hands tied—kicked a Bolivian army officer, named Captain Espinosa, against a wall after the officer entered the schoolhouse and tried to snatch Guevara's pipe from his mouth as a souvenir while he was still smoking. In another instance of defiance, Guevara spat in the face of Bolivian Rear Admiral Horacio Ugarteche, who attempted to question Guevara a few hours before his execution.

The following morning on 9 October, Guevara asked to see the school teacher of the village, a 22-year-old woman named Julia Cortez. She later stated that she found Guevara to be an "agreeable looking man with a soft and ironic glance" and that during their conversation she found herself "unable to look him in the eye" because his "gaze was unbearable, piercing, and so tranquil". During their conversation, Guevara pointed out to Cortez the poor condition of the schoolhouse, stating that it was "anti-pedagogical" to expect campesino students to be educated there, while "government officials drive Mercedes cars"; Guevara said "that's what we are fighting against".

=== Execution order ===
Later on the morning of 9 October, Bolivian President René Barrientos ordered that Guevara be killed. The order was relayed to the unit holding Guevara by Félix Rodríguez, reportedly despite the US government's desire that Guevara be taken to Panama for interrogation. The executioner who volunteered to kill Guevara was Mario Terán, a 27-year-old sergeant who, while half-drunk, requested to shoot Guevara because three of his friends from B Company had been killed in a firefight with Guevara's guerrillas days earlier. To make the bullet wounds appear consistent with the story that the Bolivian government planned to release to the public, Félix Rodríguez ordered Terán not to shoot Guevara in the head, but to aim carefully to make it appear that Guevara had been killed in action during a clash with the Bolivian army. Gary Prado Salmón, the Bolivian captain in command of the company that captured Guevara, said that the reason Barrientos ordered the immediate execution of Guevara was so there could be no possibility for Guevara to escape from prison, and so there could be no drama of a trial where adverse publicity might happen.

== Death ==
=== Execution ===
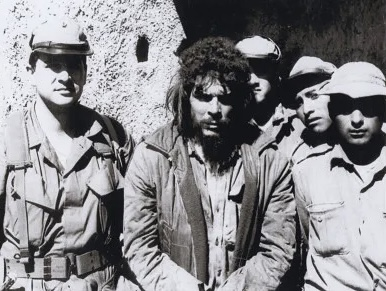
Guevara shortly before his execution, with CIA officer Félix Rodríguez (left)

About 30 minutes before Guevara was killed, Rodríguez attempted to question him about the whereabouts of other guerrilla fighters who were at large, but Guevara remained silent. Rodríguez, assisted by Bolivian soldiers, helped Guevara to his feet and took him outside the hut to parade him before other soldiers where he posed with Guevara for a photo opportunity, where one soldier took a photo of Rodríguez and other soldiers standing alongside Guevara. Afterwards, Rodríguez told Guevara that he was going to be executed. Guevara was asked by a soldier guarding him if he was thinking about his own mortality. "No" he replied, "I'm thinking about the immortality of the revolution". A few minutes later, Sergeant Terán entered the hut to shoot him, whereupon Guevara reportedly stood up and spoke to Terán what were his last words: "I know you've come to kill me. Shoot, coward! You are only going to kill a man!" Terán hesitated, then pointed his self-loading M2 carbine at Guevara and opened fire, hitting him in the arms and legs. Then, as Guevara writhed on the ground, apparently biting one of his wrists to avoid crying out, Terán fired another burst, fatally wounding him in the chest. Guevara was pronounced dead at 1:10 p.m. according to Rodríguez. In all, Guevara was shot nine times by Terán, five times in his legs, once in the right shoulder and arm, and once in the chest and throat.

Months earlier, during his last public declaration to the Tricontinental Conference, Guevara had written his own epitaph, stating: "Wherever death may surprise us, let it be welcome, provided that this our battle cry may have reached some receptive ear and another hand may be extended to wield our weapons."

=== Aftermath ===
The day after his execution on 10 October 1967, Guevara's corpse was displayed to the news media in the laundry house of the Vallegrande hospital (photo by Freddy Alborta). Face Side angle Shoes

After his execution, Guevara's body was lashed to the landing skids of a helicopter and flown to nearby Vallegrande, where photos were taken of him lying on a concrete slab in the laundry room of the Nuestra Señora de Malta. Witnesses were called to confirm his identity, key amongst them British journalist Richard Gott, the only witness to have met Guevara when he was alive. Put on display, as hundreds of local residents filed past the body, Guevara's corpse was considered by many to represent a "Christ-like" visage, with some even surreptitiously clipping locks of his hair as divine relics. Such comparisons were further extended when art critic John Berger, two weeks later upon seeing the post-mortem photographs, observed that they resembled two famous paintings: Rembrandt's The Anatomy Lesson of Dr. Nicolaes Tulp and Andrea Mantegna's Lamentation over the Dead Christ. There were also four correspondents present when Guevara's body arrived in Vallegrande, including Björn Kumm of the Swedish Aftonbladet, who described the scene in The New Republic.

A declassified memorandum dated 11 October 1967 to United States President Lyndon B. Johnson from his National Security Advisor Walt Rostow, called the decision to kill Guevara "stupid" but "understandable from a Bolivian standpoint". After the execution, Rodríguez took several of Guevara's personal items, including a watch which he continued to wear years later, often showing them to reporters during the ensuing years. Today, some of these belongings are on display by the CIA. After a military doctor dismembered his hands, Bolivian officers transferred Guevara's body to an undisclosed location and refused to reveal whether his remains had been buried or cremated. The hands were sent to Buenos Aires for fingerprint identification. They were later sent to Cuba.

Also removed when Guevara was captured were his 30,000-word, hand-written diary, a collection of his personal poetry, and a short story he had authored about a young communist guerrilla who learns to overcome his fears. His diary documented events of the campaign in Bolivia, with the first entry on 7 November 1966, shortly after his arrival at the farm in Ñancahuazú, and the last dated 7 October, the day before his capture. The diary tells how the guerrillas were forced to begin operations prematurely because of discovery by the Bolivian Army, explains Guevara's decision to divide the column into two units that were subsequently unable to re-establish contact, and describes their unsuccessful venture. It records the rift between Guevara and the Communist Party of Bolivia that resulted in Guevara having significantly fewer soldiers than expected, and shows that Guevara had difficulty recruiting from the local populace, partly because the guerrilla group had learned Quechua, unaware that the local language was a Tupi–Guarani language. As the campaign drew to an unexpected close, Guevara became increasingly ill. He endured ever-worsening bouts of asthma, and most of his last offensives were carried out in an attempt to obtain medicine. The diary was crudely translated by Ramparts magazine and circulated around the world. There are at least four editions of the diary in existence—those of Israel Reyes Zayas (Alias "Braulio"), Harry Villegas Tamayo ("Pombo"), Eliseo Reyes Rodriguez ("Rolando"), and Dariel Alarcón Ramírez ("Benigno")—each of which reveals additional aspects of the events.

French intellectual Régis Debray, who was captured in April 1967 while with Guevara, gave an interview from prison in August 1968, in which he expanded on the circumstances of Guevara's capture. Debray described a destitute situation where Guevara's men suffered malnutrition, lack of water, absence of shoes, and only possessed six blankets for 22 men. Debray recounts that Guevara and the others had an "illness" which caused their hands and feet to swell into "mounds of flesh" to the point where their fingers could not be discerned. Debray described Guevara as "optimistic about the future of Latin America" despite the futile situation, and remarked that Guevara was "resigned to die in the knowledge that his death would be a sort of renaissance", noting that Guevara perceived death "as a promise of rebirth" and "ritual of renewal".

=== Commemoration in Cuba ===
On 15 October in Havana, Castro publicly acknowledged that Guevara was dead and proclaimed three days of public mourning. On 18 October, Castro addressed a crowd of one million mourners in Havana's Plaza de la Revolución and spoke about Guevara's character as a revolutionary. Castro remarked about Guevarism's legacy:

...those who sing victory are wrong. Those who believe his death is the defeat of his ideas, the defeat of his tactics, the defeat of his guerrilla conceptions, and the defeat of his thesis are mistaken. Because that man who fell as a mortal man, as a man who was exposed many times to bullets, as a soldier, as a leader, is a thousand times more capable than those who killed him with a stroke of luck.

Castro closed his impassioned eulogy saying:

If we wish to express what we want the men of future generations to be, we must say: Let them be like Che! If we wish to say how we want our children to be educated, we must say without hesitation: We want them to be educated in Che's spirit! If we want the model of a man, who does not belong to our times but to the future, I say from the depths of my heart that such a model, without a single stain on his conduct, without a single stain on his action, is Che!

=== International commemoration ===
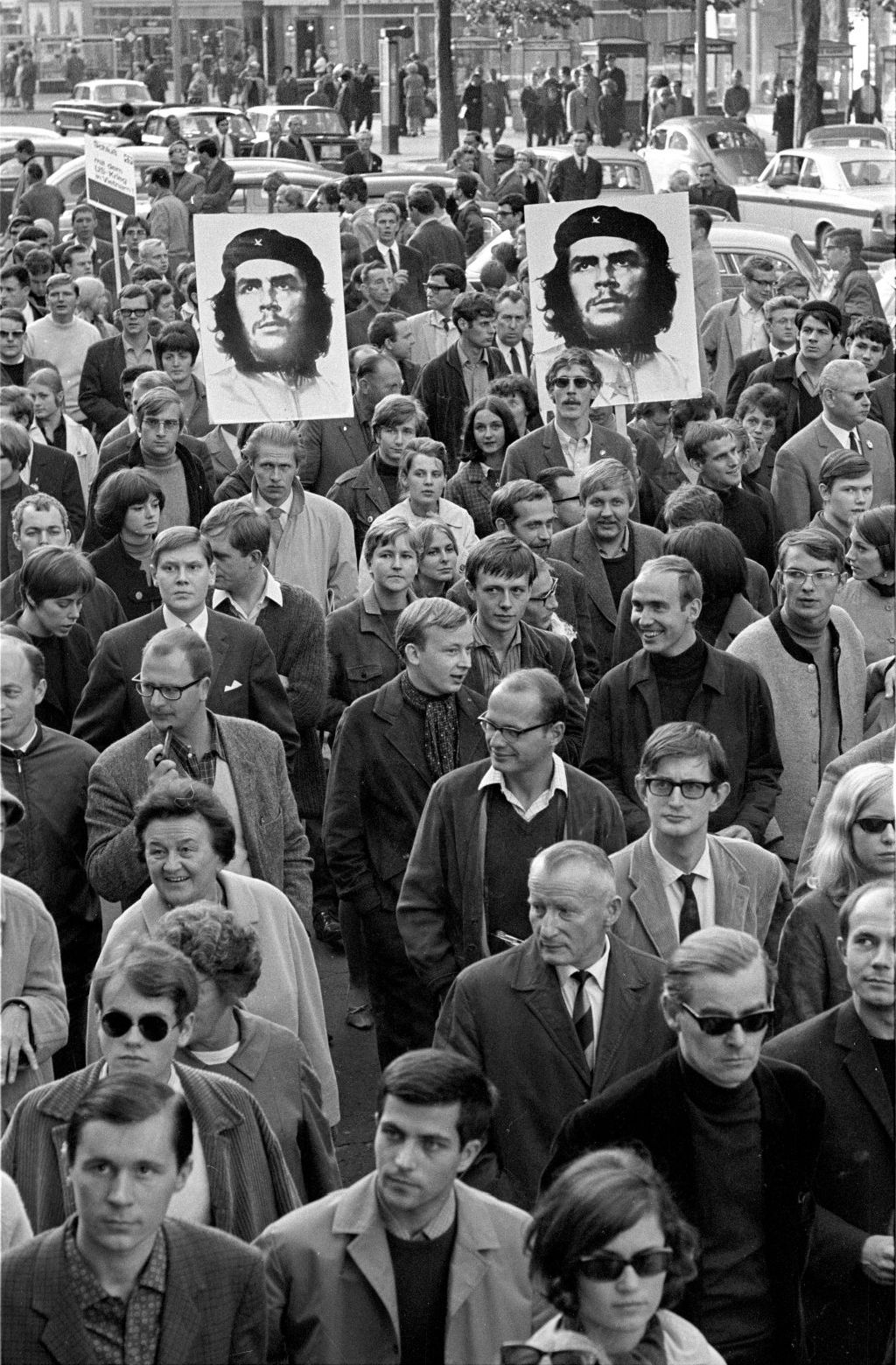
Portraits of Che Guevara at a march during the West German student movement

After pictures of the dead Guevara began being circulated and the circumstances of his death were being debated, Che's legacy began to spread. Demonstrations in protest against his "assassination" occurred throughout the world, and articles, tributes, and poems were written about his life and death. Rallies in support of Guevara were held from "Mexico to Santiago, Algiers to Angola, and Cairo to Calcutta". The population of Budapest and Prague lit candles to honor Guevara's passing, and the picture of a smiling Che appeared in London and Paris.

A few months later, riots broke out in Berlin, France, and Chicago, and the unrest spread to the American college campuses. Young men and women wore Che T-shirts and carried his pictures during their protest marches. In the view of military historian Erik Durschmied: "In those heady months of 1968, Che Guevara was not dead. He was very much alive." US students began to emulate his style of dress, donning military fatigues, berets, and growing their hair and beards to show that they too were opponents of U.S. foreign policy. For instance, the Black Panthers began to style themselves "Che-type" while adopting his trademark black beret, while Arab guerrillas began to name combat operations in his honor. Radical left-wing activists responded to Guevara's apparent indifference to rewards and glory, and concurred with Guevara's sanctioning of violence as a necessity to instill socialist ideals.

== Legacy ==
=== Ideology and policy in Cuba ===
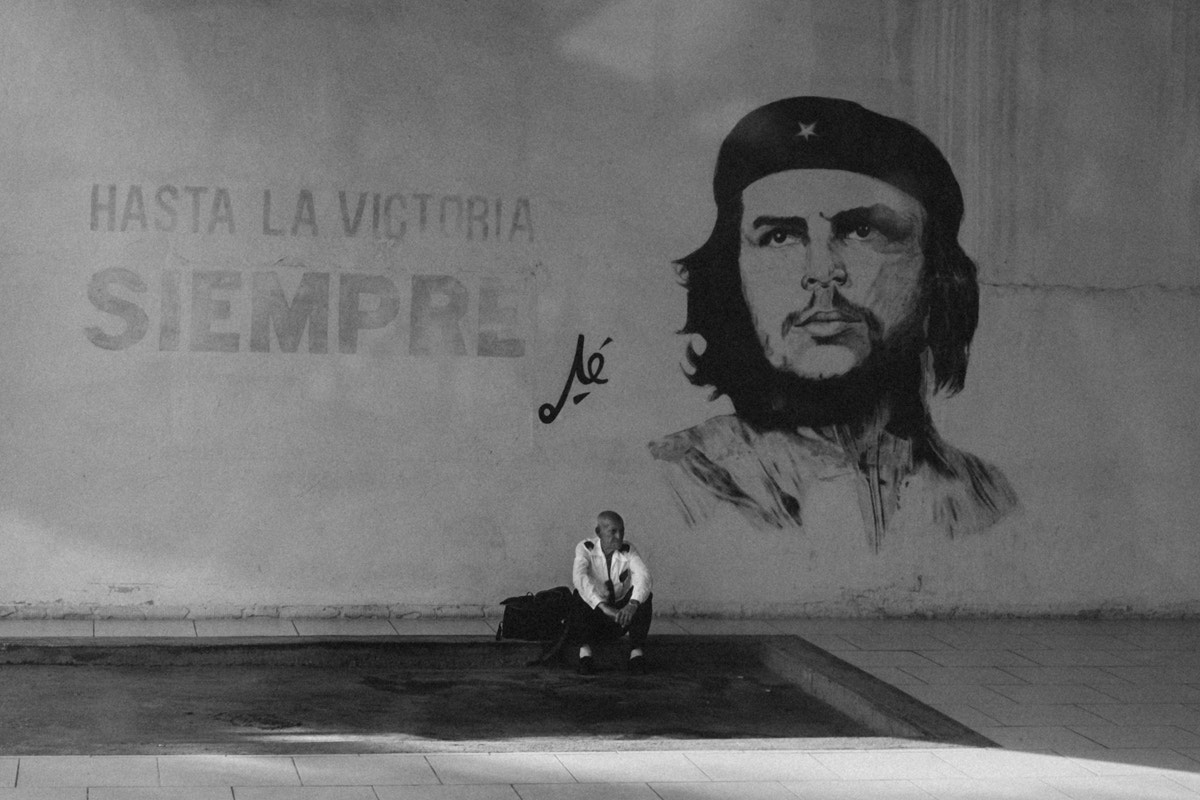
Portrait of Che Guevara, with quote, in Santa Clara, Cuba. Quote translates as: "Until victory, always".

As early as 1965, the Yugoslav communist journal Borba observed the many half-completed or empty factories in Cuba, a legacy of Guevara's short tenure as Minister of Industries, "standing like sad memories of the conflict between pretension and reality". The ethos of Guevara's "socialist new man": a citizen committed to self-sacrifice and asceticism, was still revered in Cuba after Guevara's departure. The definition of the "socialist new man" was often edited to justify certain labor programs. A famous utilization of the "new man" concept was in the labelling of certain sectors of the Cuban population as "anti-socials", who had fallen outside the "new man" concept. Between 1965 and 1968, these "anti-socials" were interned in UMAP labor camps.

In 1966, during Guevara's adventures abroad, the Cuban economy was reorganized on Guevarist moral lines. Cuban propaganda stressed voluntarism and ideological motivations to increase productions. Material incentives were not given to workers who were more productive than others. Cuban intellectuals were expected to participate actively in creating a positive national ethos and ignore any desire to create "art for art's sake".

Guevara's death in 1967 precipitated the abandonment of guerrilla warfare as an instrument of Cuban foreign policy, ushering in a rapprochement with the Soviet Union, and the reformation of the government along Soviet lines. When Cuban troops returned to Africa in the 1970s, it was as part of a large-scale military expedition, and support for insurrection movements in Latin America and the Caribbean became logistical and organizational rather than overt. Cuba also abandoned Guevara's plans for economic diversification and rapid industrialization, which had ultimately proved to be impracticable in view of the country's incorporation into the Comecon system.

In 1968, the Cuban economy was remodeled, inspired by Guevara's arguments in the Great Debate, from years earlier. All non-agricultural private businesses was nationalized, central planning was done more on an ad-hoc basis, and the entire Cuban economy was directed at producing a 10 million ton sugar harvest. The focus on sugar would eventually render all other facets of the Cuban economy underdeveloped and would be the ultimate legacy of the offensive.

A series of economic reforms in Cuba, officially titled the "Rectification of Errors and Negative Tendencies", were based in the economic ethos of Guevarism. The reforms began in 1986, and lasted until 1992. The policy changes were aimed at eliminating private businesses, trade markets, that had been introduced into the Cuban law and Cuban culture during the 1970s. The new reforms aimed to nationalize more of the economy and eliminate material incentives for extra labor, instead relying on moral enthusiasm alone. Castro often justified this return to moral incentives by mentioning the moral incentives championed by Che Guevara, and often alluded to Guevarism when promoting these reforms.

The economic reforms, and mass mobilizations, implemented during the Battle of Ideas (2000–2006), were often conducted in homage to the philosophy of Che Guevara. These reforms stressed economic voluntarism, central planning, and radical consciousness as a driver of the economy.

=== Ideology in Argentina ===
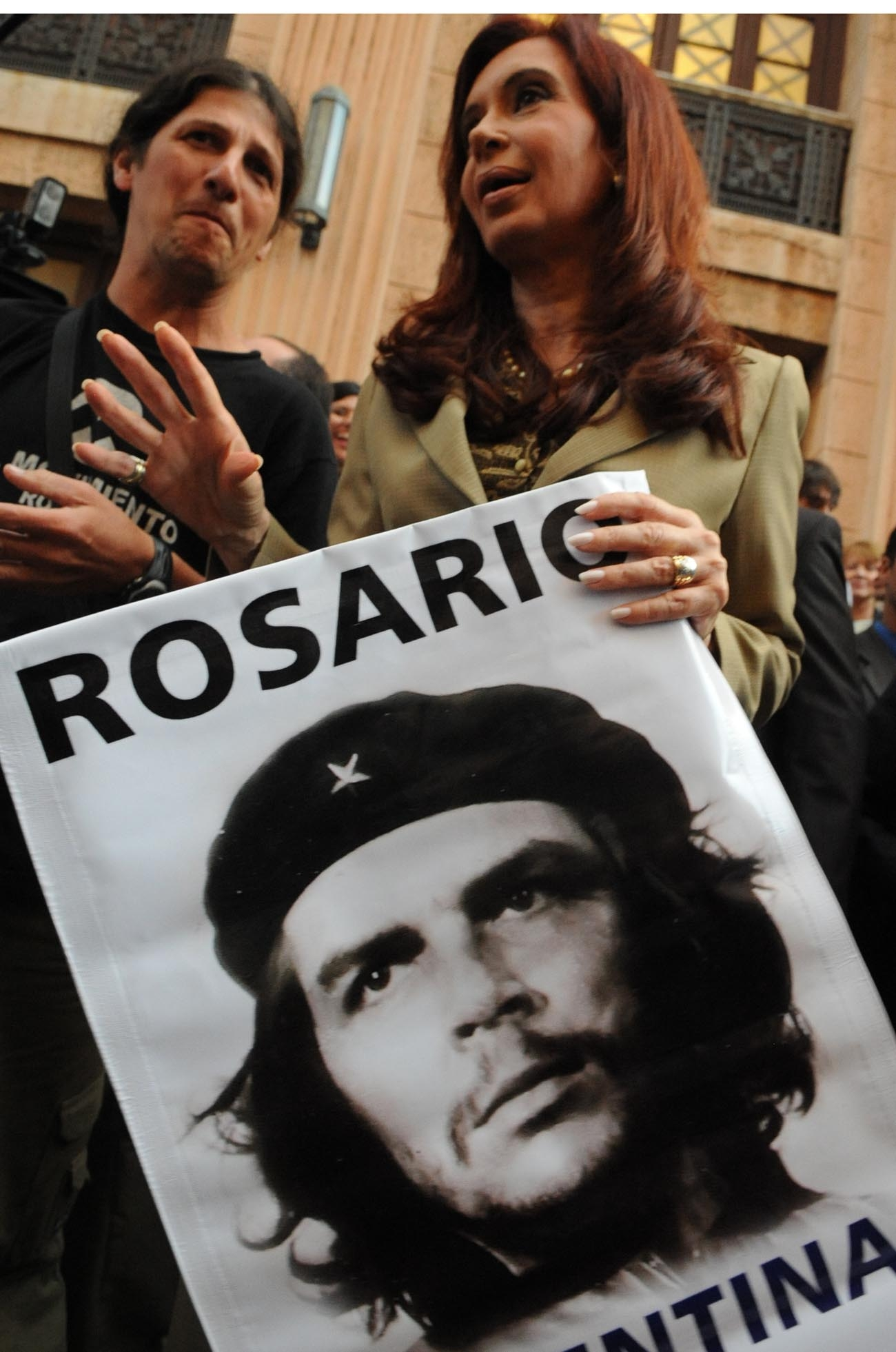
Former Argentine president Cristina Fernández de Kirchner with a poster of Che Guevara, 2009.

Argentina felt the impact of the Cuban Revolution, as John William Cooke, a close associate of Perón who emerged as the main representative of the Peronist left, moved to Cuba in 1960. While in Cuba, Cooke associated Peronism with Fidelismo, and seeing the left-wing nationalism of Peronism and Marxism-Leninism of Fidelismo as complementary; he wrote:

Nowadays nobody thinks that national liberation can be achieved without social revolution and therefore the struggle is also [one] by the poor against the rich... Since national liberation is indivisible from social revolution, there is no bourgeois nationalism, for the bourgeoisie's objective was to 'privatize the lucre and socialize the sacrifices.

Cooke's concept of mixing national liberation with social revolution became the core concept of a new "Revolutionary Peronism", and was embraced by Perón himself.

With the assistance of Cooke, Cuba opened a dialogue between the new Cuban government and Perón. Che Guevara appealed for unity amongst anti-imperialist forces in Latin America, and explicitly recognized Peronism as a fellow in the anti-imperialist movement. Perón himself praised the Cuban Revolution and discussed the parallels it had with his own 'revolution', and would increasingly adapt the Cuban rhetoric throughout the 1960s. Che Guevara subsequently visited Perón in Madrid, and argued that Peronism is "a kind of indigenous Latin American socialism with which the Cuban Revolution could side". Perón maintained a close relationship with Guevara and paid homage to him upon his death in 1967, calling him "one of ours, perhaps the best" and remarking that Peronism:

...as a national, popular and revolutionary movement, pays homage to the idealist, the revolutionary, Comandante Ernesto Che Guevara, Argentine guerrilla dead in action taking up arms to seek the triumph of national revolutions in Latin America.

Che Guevara has continued to have a lasting impact on the Argentine left. When President Cristina Fernández de Kirchner made 24 March a holiday to remember the fall of the Argentine military dictatorship, the holiday was first celebrated by a mass parade of communist groups and trade unions, many waving banners displaying the face of Guevara.

=== Retrieval of remains and possessions ===
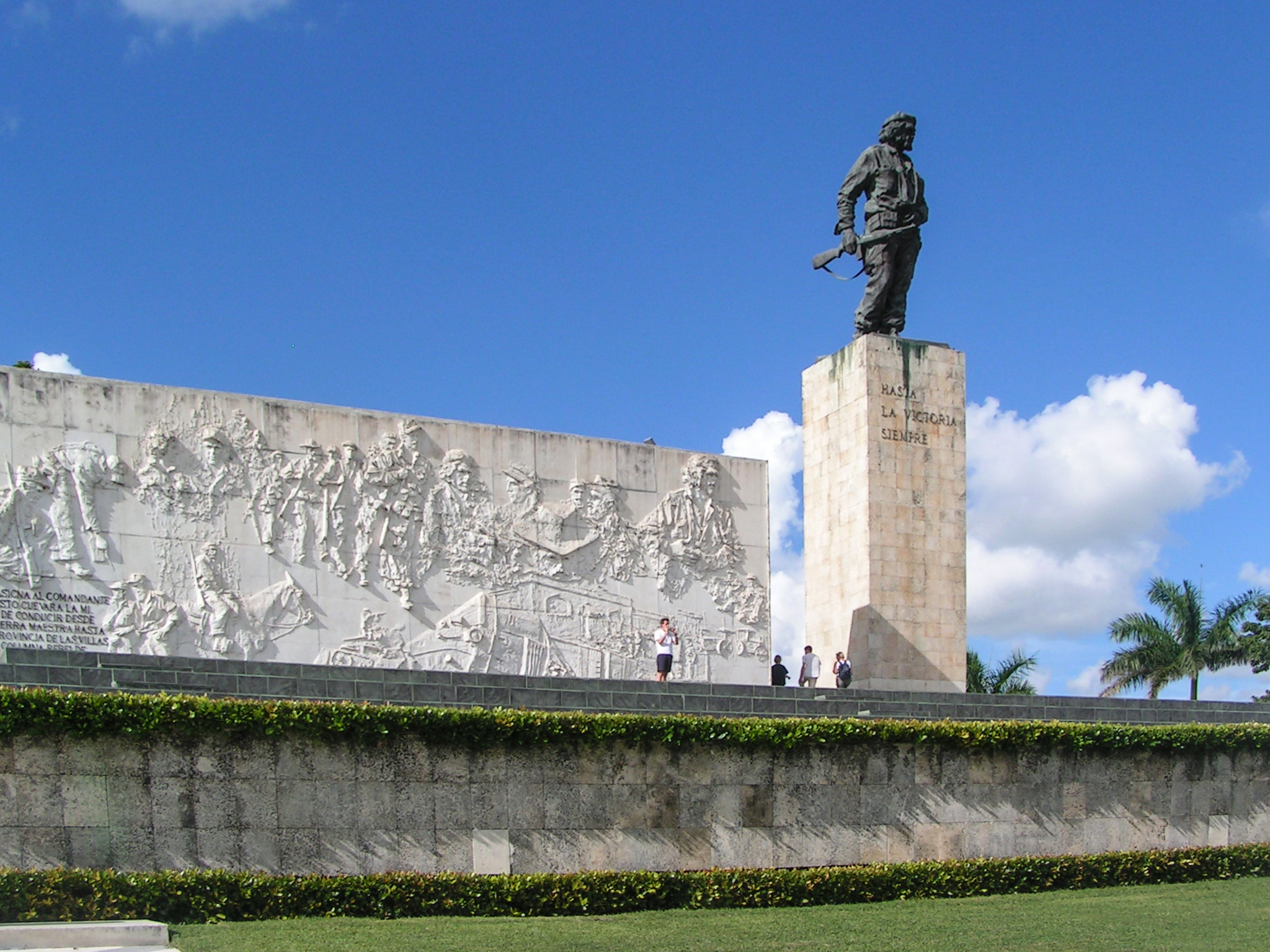
Che Guevara's Monument and Mausoleum in Santa Clara, Cuba

In late 1995, the retired Bolivian General Mario Vargas revealed to Jon Lee Anderson, author of Che Guevara: A Revolutionary Life, that Guevara's corpse lay near a Vallegrande airstrip. The result was a multi-national search for the remains, which lasted more than a year. In July 1997, a team of Cuban geologists and Argentine forensic anthropologists discovered the remnants of seven bodies in two mass graves, including one man without hands (as Guevara would have been). Bolivian government officials with the Ministry of Interior later identified the body as Guevara when the excavated teeth "perfectly matched" a plaster mold of Che's teeth made in Cuba prior to his Congolese expedition. The "clincher" then arrived when Argentine forensic anthropologist Alejandro Inchaurregui inspected the inside hidden pocket of a blue jacket dug up next to the handless cadaver and found a small bag of pipe tobacco. Niño de Guzmán, the Bolivian helicopter pilot who had given Che a small bag of tobacco, later remarked that he "had serious doubts" at first and "thought the Cubans would just find any old bones and call it Che"; but "after hearing about the tobacco pouch, I have no doubts." On 17 October 1997 (30 years and 8 days after Guevara's death), Guevara's remains, with those of six of his fellow combatants, were laid to rest with military honors in a specially built mausoleum in the Cuban city of Santa Clara, where he had commanded over the decisive military victory of the Cuban Revolution.

In July 2008, the Bolivian government of Evo Morales unveiled Guevara's sealed diaries composed of two frayed notebooks, along with a logbook and several black-and-white photographs. At this event, Bolivia's vice-minister of culture, Pablo Groux, expressed that there were plans to publish photographs of every handwritten page later in the year. Meanwhile, in August 2009, anthropologists working for Bolivia's Justice Ministry discovered and unearthed the bodies of five of Guevara's fellow guerrillas near the Bolivian town of Teoponte.

The discovery of Che's remains metonymically activated a series of interlinked associations—rebel, martyr, rogue figure from a picaresque adventure, savior, renegade, extremist—in which there was no fixed divide among them. The current court of opinion places Che on a continuum that teeters between viewing him as a misguided rebel, a coruscatingly brilliant guerrilla philosopher, a poet-warrior jousting at windmills, a brazen warrior who threw down the gauntlet to the bourgeoisie, the object of fervent paeans to his sainthood, or a mass murderer clothed in the guise of an avenging angel whose every action is imbricated in violence—the archetypal Fanatical Terrorist.

— Dr. Peter McLaren, author of Che Guevara, Paulo Freire, and the Pedagogy of Revolution

=== Biographical debate ===
Guevara's life and legacy remain contentious. The perceived contradictions of his ethos at points in his life present a complex character, who was "able to wield the pen and submachine gun with equal skill", while prophesying that "the most important revolutionary ambition was to see man liberated from his alienation". Guevara's paradoxical standing is complicated by his array of seemingly diametrically opposed qualities. He was a secular humanist and sympathetic practitioner of medicine who did not hesitate to shoot enemies, a celebrated internationalist leader who advocated violence to enforce a utopian philosophy of the collective good, an idealistic intellectual who loved literature but refused to allow dissent, an anti-imperialist Marxist insurgent who was willing to forge a poverty-less new world on the apocalyptic ashes of the old one, and an outspoken anti-capitalist whose image has been commoditized. Che's history continues to be rewritten. Sociologist Michael Löwy contends that facets of Guevara's life illuminated the rise of the "Che myth", allowing him to be invariably crystallized in his many metanarrative roles as a "Red Robin Hood, Don Quixote of communism, new Garibaldi, Marxist Saint Just, Cid Campeador of the Wretched of the Earth, Sir Galahad of the beggars ... and Bolshevik devil who haunts the dreams of the rich, kindling braziers of subversion all over the world".

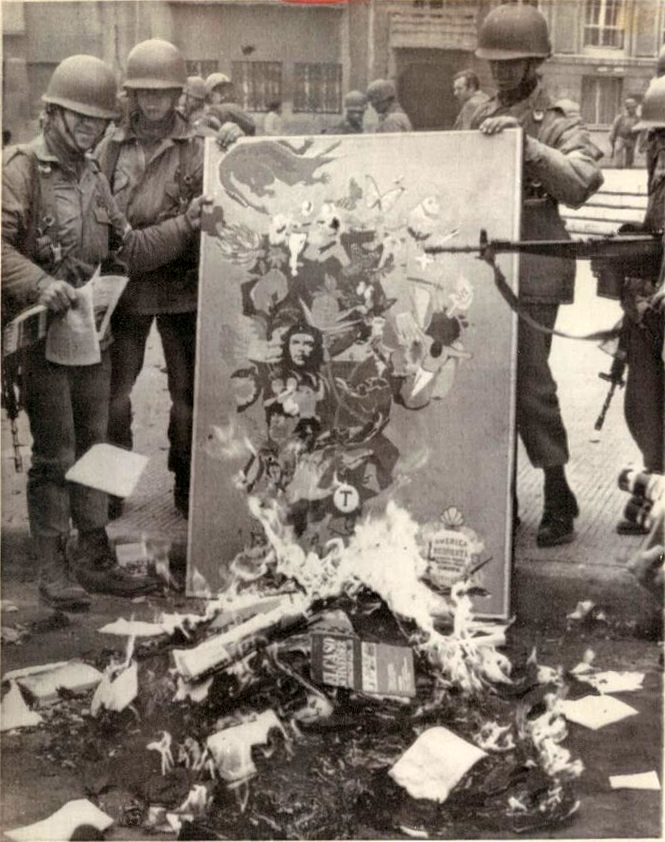
Burning of a painting containing Che's face, following the 1973 coup that installed the Pinochet regime in Chile

Notable individuals have lauded Guevara; for example, Nelson Mandela referred to him as "an inspiration for every human being who loves freedom", while Jean-Paul Sartre described him as "not only an intellectual but also the most complete human being of our age". Others who have expressed their admiration include authors Graham Greene, who remarked that Guevara "represented the idea of gallantry, chivalry, and adventure", and Susan Sontag, who supposed that "[Che's] goal was nothing less than the cause of humanity itself." Frantz Fanon professed Guevara to be "the world symbol of the possibilities of one man", while Black Power leader Stokely Carmichael eulogized that "Che Guevara is not dead, his ideas are with us." Praise has been reflected throughout the political spectrum, with libertarian theorist Murray Rothbard extolling Guevara as a "heroic figure" who "more than any man of our epoch or even of our century, was the living embodiment of the principle of revolution", while journalist Christopher Hitchens reminisced that "[Che's] death meant a lot to me and countless like me at the time, he was a role model, albeit an impossible one for us bourgeois romantics insofar as he went and did what revolutionaries were meant to do—fought and died for his beliefs." CIA employee Philip Agee said "There was no person more feared by the company (CIA) than Che Guevara because he had the capacity and charisma necessary to direct the struggle against the political repression of the traditional hierarchies in power in the countries of Latin America".

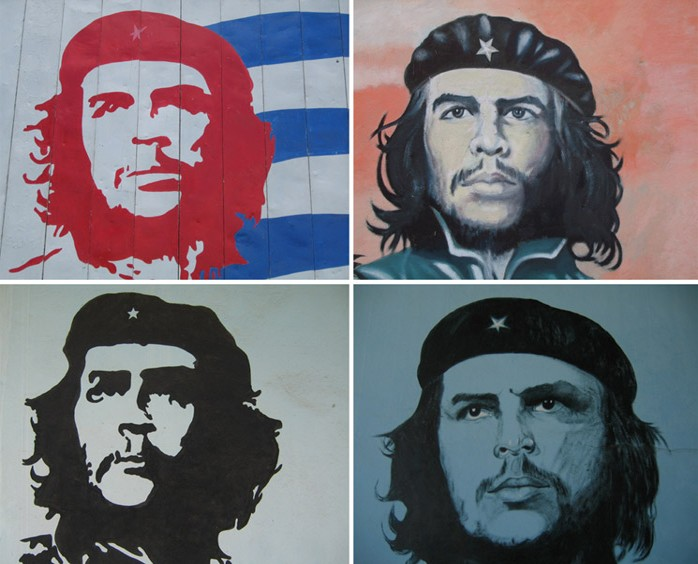
Author Michael Casey notes how Che's image—largely based on Alberto Korda's 1960 photograph Guerrillero Heroico—has become a logo as recognizable as the Nike Swoosh or McDonald's Golden Arches.

Conversely, Jacobo Machover, an exiled opposition author, dismisses praise of Guevara and portrays him as a callous executioner. Exiled former Cuban prisoners have expressed similar opinions, among them Armando Valladares, who declared Guevara "a man full of hatred" who executed dozens without trial, and Carlos Alberto Montaner, who asserted that Guevara possessed "a Robespierre mentality", wherein cruelty against the revolution's enemies was a virtue. Álvaro Vargas Llosa of the Independent Institute has hypothesized that Guevara's contemporary followers "delude themselves by clinging to a myth", describing Guevara as a "Marxist Puritan" who employed his rigid power to suppress dissent, while operating as a "cold-blooded killing machine". Llosa accuses Guevara's "fanatical disposition" as being the linchpin of the "Sovietization" of the revolution, speculating that he possessed a "total subordination of reality to blind ideological orthodoxy". Hoover Institution fellow William Ratliff regards Guevara more as a creation of his historical environment, referring to him as a "fearless" and "head-strong Messiah-like figure", who was the product of a martyr-enamored Latin American culture which "inclined people to seek out and follow paternalistic miracle workers". Ratliff speculates that economic conditions suited Guevara's commitment to "bring justice to the downtrodden by crushing centuries-old tyrannies"; describing Latin America as being plagued by what Moisés Naím referred to as the "legendary malignancies" of inequality, poverty, dysfunctional politics and malfunctioning institutions.

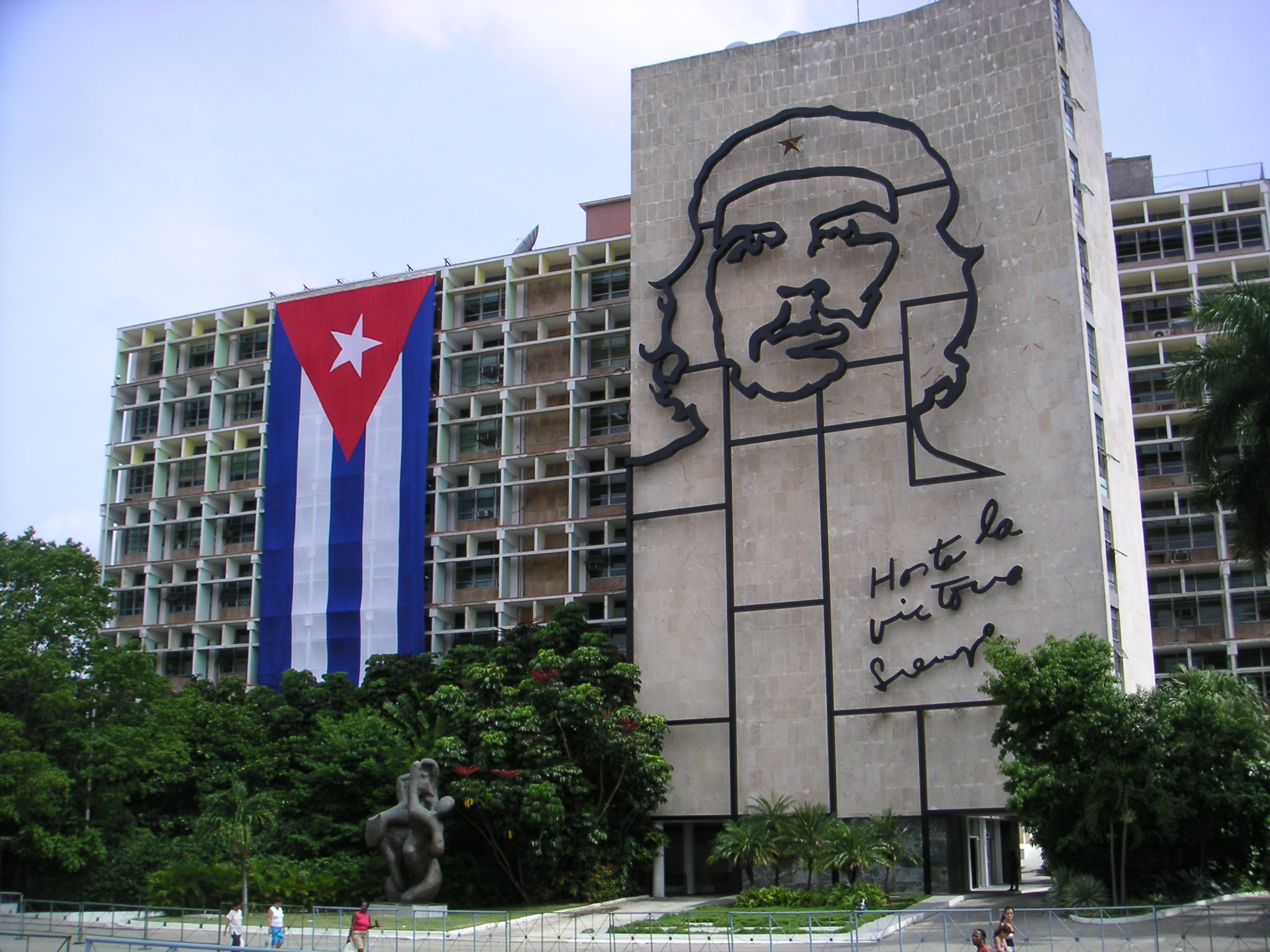
Plaza de la Revolución, in Havana, Cuba. Aside the Ministry of the Interior building where Guevara once worked is a 5-story steel outline of his face. Under the image is Guevara's motto, the Spanish phrase: "Hasta la Victoria Siempre" (English: Until Victory, always).

In a mixed assessment, historian Hugh Thomas opined that Guevara was a "brave, sincere and determined man who was also obstinate, narrow, and dogmatic". At the end of his life, "he seems to have become convinced of the virtues of violence for its own sake", while "his influence over Castro for good or evil" grew after his death, as Fidel took up many of his views. Cuban-American sociologist Samuel Farber lauds Che Guevara as "an honest and committed revolutionary", but criticizes the fact "he never embraced socialism in its most democratic essence". Guevara remains a Cuban hero, where his image adorns the 3 peso coin and schoolchildren begin each morning pledging "We will be like Che." In his homeland of Argentina, where high schools bear his name, Che museums dot the country, and in 2008, a 3.5-metre (12 ft) bronze statue of him was unveiled in the city of his birth, Rosario. Guevara has been sanctified by Bolivian campesinos as "Saint Ernesto", who pray to him for assistance. Guevara remains a hated figure amongst many in the Cuban exile and Cuban American community of the US, who view him as "the butcher of La Cabaña". Despite this polarized status, a high-contrast monochrome graphic of Che's face, created in 1968 by artist Jim Fitzpatrick, became a universally merchandized and objectified image, found on an endless array of items, including T-shirts, hats, posters, tattoos, and bikinis, contributing to the consumer culture Guevara despised. Yet, he still remains a transcendent figure in political contexts and as a popular icon of youthful rebellion.

Addressing the flexibility of his legacy, Trisha Ziff, director of the documentary Chevolution, remarked that "Che Guevara's significance in modern times is less about the man and his specific history, and more about the ideals of creating a better society." Writer Ariel Dorfman has suggested Guevara's enduring appeal might be because "to those who will never follow in his footsteps, submerged as they are in a world of cynicism, self-interest and frantic consumption, nothing could be more vicariously gratifying than Che's disdain for material comfort and everyday desires."

=== International honors ===
Guevara received several honors of state during his life.

- 1960: Knight Grand Cross of the Order of the White Lion
- 1961: Knight Grand Cross of the Order of the Southern Cross

== Archival media ==
=== Video footage ===
- Guevara addressing the United Nations General Assembly on 11 December 1964, (6:21), public domain footage uploaded by the UN, video clip
- Guevara interviewed by Face the Nation on 13 December 1964, (29:11), from CBS, video clip
- Guevara interviewed in 1964 on a visit to Dublin, Ireland, (2:53), English translation, from RTÉ Libraries and Archives, video clip
- Guevara interviewed in Paris and speaking French in 1964, (4:47), English subtitles, interviewed by Jean Dumur, video clip
- Guevara reciting a poem, (0:58), English subtitles, from El Che: Investigating a Legend – Kultur Video 2001, video clip
- Guevara showing support for Fidel Castro, (0:22), English subtitles, from El Che: Investigating a Legend – Kultur Video 2001, video clip
- Guevara speaking about labor, (0:28), English subtitles, from El Che: Investigating a Legend – Kultur Video 2001, video clip
- Guevara speaking about the Bay of Pigs, (0:17), English subtitles, from El Che: Investigating a Legend – Kultur Video 2001, video clip
- Guevara speaking against imperialism, (1:20), English subtitles, from El Che: Investigating a Legend – Kultur Video 2001, video clip
- Guevara visiting Algeria in 1963 and giving a speech in French, from the Algerian Cinema Archive, video clip

=== Audio recording ===
- Guevara interviewed on ABC's Issues and Answers, (22:27), English translation, narrated by Lisa Howard, 24 March 1964, audio clip

== List of English-language works ==
- A New Society: Reflections for Today's World, Ocean Press, 1996, ISBN 1875284060
- Back on the Road: A Journey Through Latin America, Grove Press, 2002, ISBN 0802139426
- Che Guevara, Cuba, and the Road to Socialism, Pathfinder Press, 1991, ISBN 0873486439
- Che Guevara on Global Justice, Ocean Press (AU), 2002, ISBN 1876175451
- Che Guevara: Radical Writings on Guerrilla Warfare, Politics and Revolution, Filiquarian Publishing, 2006, ISBN 1599869993
- Che Guevara Reader: Writings on Politics & Revolution, Ocean Press, 2003, ISBN 1876175699
- Che Guevara Speaks: Selected Speeches and Writings, Pathfinder Press (NY), 1980, ISBN 0873486021
- Che Guevara Talks to Young People, Pathfinder, 2000, ISBN 087348911X
- Che: The Diaries of Ernesto Che Guevara, Ocean Press (AU), 2008, ISBN 1920888934
- Colonialism is Doomed, Ministry of External Relations: Republic of Cuba, 1964, ASIN B0010AAN1K
- Congo Diary: The Story of Che Guevara's "Lost" Year in Africa Ocean Press, 2011, ISBN 978-0980429299
- Critical Notes on Political Economy: A Revolutionary Humanist Approach to Marxist Economics, Ocean Press, 2008, ISBN 1876175559
- Diary of a Combatant: The Diary of the Revolution that Made Che Guevara a Legend, Ocean Press, 2013, ISBN 978-0987077943
- Episodes of the Cuban Revolutionary War, 1956–58, Pathfinder Press (NY), 1996, ISBN 0873488245
- Global Justice: Three Essays on Liberation and Socialism, Seven Stories Press, 2022, ISBN 1644211564
- Guerrilla Warfare: Authorized Edition, Ocean Press, 2006, ISBN 1-920888-28-4
- I Embrace You with All My Revolutionary Fervor: Letters 1947-1967, Seven Stories Press, 2021, ISBN 1644210959
- Latin America: Awakening of a Continent, Ocean Press, 2005, ISBN 1876175737
- Latin America Diaries: The Sequel to The Motorcycle Diaries, Ocean Press, 2011, ISBN 978-0980429275
- Marx & Engels: An Introduction, Ocean Press, 2007, ISBN 1920888926
- Our America And Theirs: Kennedy And The Alliance For Progress, Ocean Press, 2006, ISBN 1876175818
- Reminiscences of the Cuban Revolutionary War: Authorized Edition, Ocean Press, 2005, ISBN 1920888330
- Self Portrait Che Guevara, Ocean Press (AU), 2004, ISBN 1876175826
- Socialism and Man in Cuba, Pathfinder Press (NY), 1989, ISBN 0873485777
- The African Dream: The Diaries of the Revolutionary War in the Congo, Grove Press, 2001, ISBN 0802138349
- The Argentine, Ocean Press (AU), 2008, ISBN 1920888934
- The Awakening of Latin America: Writings, Letters and Speeches on Latin America, 1950–67, Ocean Press, 2012, ISBN 978-0980429282
- The Bolivian Diary of Ernesto Che Guevara, Pathfinder Press, 1994, ISBN 0873487664
- The Great Debate on Political Economy, Ocean Press, 2006, ISBN 1876175540
- The Motorcycle Diaries: A Journey Around South America, London: Verso, 1996, ISBN 1857023994
- The Secret Papers of a Revolutionary: The Diary of Che Guevara, American Reprint Co, 1975, ASIN B0007GW08W
- To Speak the Truth: Why Washington's "Cold War" Against Cuba Doesn't End, Pathfinder, 1993, ISBN 0873486331

== See also ==
Main:

- Guerrillero Heroico
- Che Guevara in popular culture
- Legacy of Che Guevara
- Guevarism

Books:

- The Motorcycle Diaries
- Guerrilla Warfare
- Episodes of the Cuban Revolutionary War

Films:

- Che – Part 1 & Part 2
- The Motorcycle Diaries
- Che!
- The Hands of Che Guevara

== Works cited ==
- Abrams, Dennis (2010). Ernesto Che Guevara. Infobase Publishing. ISBN 978-1438134642.
- Almudevar, Lola (9 October 2007). "Bolivia marks capture, execution of 'Che' Guevara 40 years ago". SFGate. Archived from the original on 28 May 2008.
- Anderson, Jon Lee (1997). Che Guevara: a revolutionary life. New York: Grove Press. ISBN 0802116000.
- Bamford, James (2002). Body of secrets anatomy of the ultra-secret National Security Agency. New York: Anchor Books. ISBN 0385499086.
- "Profile: Laurent Kabila". BBC News. 17 January 2001.
- "Che Guevara photographer dies". BBC News. 26 May 2001.
- "Cuba pays tribute to Che Guevara". BBC News. 9 October 2007.
- Beaubien, Jason (2009). "Cuba Marks 50 Years Since 'Triumphant Revolution'". NPR.
- Ben Bella, Ahmed (1 October 1997). "Che as I knew him". Le Monde diplomatique.
- Bockman, Major Larry James (1 April 1984). The Spirit Of Moncada: Fidel Castro's Rise To Power, 1953–1959. Quantico, Virginia: Marine Corps Command and Staff College.
- Bradbury, Pablo (2023). Liberationist Christianity in Argentina (1930-1983). Ingram Publisher Services. ISBN 978-1-80010-922-3. ISSN 2633-7061.
- Casey, Michael (2009). Che's Afterlife: The Legacy of an Image. Vintage Books. ISBN 978-0307279309.
- Castañeda, Jorge G. (1998). Compañero : the life and death of Che Guevara. New York: Vintage Books. ISBN 0679759409.
- Crompton, Samuel (2009). Che Guevara: The Making of a Revolutionary. Gareth Stevens. ISBN 978-1433900532.
- Cullather, Nicholas (2006). Secret History: The CIA's classified account of its operations in Guatemala, 1952–1954. Palo Alto, California: Stanford University Press. ISBN 978-0804754682.
- DePalma, Anthony (2006). The man who invented Fidel : Cuba, Castro, and Herbert L. Matthews of The New York Times. New York: Public Affairs. ISBN 1586483323.
- Dorfman, Ariel (14 June 1999). "Time 100: Che Guevara". Time. Archived from the original on 25 April 2011.
- Dorschner, John; Fabricio, Roberto (1980). The Winds of December: The Cuban Revolution of 1958. New York: Coward, McCann & Geoghegen. ISBN 0698109937.
- Dumur, Jean (interviewer) (1964). L'interview de Che Guevara (Video clip; 9:43; with English subtitles).
- Durschmied, Erik (2002). The Blood of Revolution: From the Reign of Terror to the Rise of Khomeini. Arcade Publishing. ISBN 1559706074.
- Free Society Project Inc. / Cuba Archive (30 September 2009). ""Documented Victims of Che Guevara in Cuba: 1957 to 1959" (PDF). Archived from the original (PDF) on 15 April 2010. (244 KB)". Summit, New Jersey: Free Society Project.
- Gálvez, William (1999). Che in Africa: Che Guevara's Congo Diary. Melbourne: Ocean Press, 1999. ISBN 1876175087.
- Gómez Treto, Raúl (Spring 1991). "Thirty Years of Cuban Revolutionary Penal Law". Latin American Perspectives. 18 (2 Cuban Views on the Revolution): 114–125. doi:10.1177/0094582X9101800211. JSTOR 2633612.
- Gleijeses, Piero (1991). Shattered Hope: The Guatemalan Revolution and the United States, 1944–1954. Princeton, New Jersey: Princeton University Press. ISBN 978-0691025568.
- Gott, Richard (2004). Cuba: A New History. Yale University Press. ISBN 0300104111.
- Gott, Richard (11 August 2005). "Bolivia on the Day of the Death of Che Guevara". Le Monde diplomatique. Archived from the original on 26 November 2005.
- Grant, Will (8 October 2007). "CIA man recounts Che Guevara's death". BBC News.
- Guevara, Ernesto "Che" (1965). "Che Guevara's Farewell Letter".
- Guevara, Ernesto "Che" (1967). "Diario (Bolivia)". Written 1966–1967.
- Guevara, Ernesto "Che" (editors Bonachea, Rolando E. and Nelson P. Valdés; 1969). Che: Selected Works of Ernesto Guevara, Cambridge, Massachusetts: MIT Press. ISBN 0262520168
- Guevara, Ernesto (2009). Che: The Diaries of Ernesto Che Guevara. Ocean Press. ISBN 978-1920888930.
- Guevara, Ernesto "Che" (1972). Pasajes de la guerra revolucionaria.
- Guevara, Ernesto "Che" (2000). The African Dream. Translated by Camiller, Patrick. New York: Grove Publishers. ISBN 0802138349.
- Guevara, Ernesto; Deutschmann, David (1997). Che Guevara Reader: Writings by Ernesto Che Guevara on Guerrilla Strategy, Politics & Revolution. Ocean Press. ISBN 1875284931.
- Guevara Lynch, Ernesto (2000). Aquí va un soldado de América [Here goes a soldier from America] (in Spanish). Barcelona: Plaza y Janés Editores, S.A. ISBN 8401013275.
- Guevara Lynch, Ernesto (2007). The Young Che: Memories of Che Guevara by His Father. Vintage Books. ISBN 978-0307390448.
- Haney, Rich (2005). Celia Sánchez: The Legend of Cuba's Revolutionary Heart. New York: Algora Pub. ISBN 0875863957.
- Katrin Hansing (2002). Rasta, Race and Revolution: The Emergence and Development of the Rastafari Movement in Socialist Cuba. LIT Verlag Münster. ISBN 3825896005.
- Hart, Joseph (2004). Che: The Life, Death, and Afterlife of a Revolutionary. New York: Thunder's Mouth Press. ISBN 1560255196.
- Immerman, Richard H. (1982). The CIA in Guatemala: The Foreign Policy of Intervention. Austin, Texas: University of Texas Press. ISBN 978-0292710832.
- Ireland's Own (12 August 2000). "From Cuba to Congo, Dream to Disaster for Che Guevara". Archived from the original on 9 February 2006.
- Kellner, Douglas (1989). Ernesto "Che" Guevara (World Leaders Past & Present). Chelsea House Publishers. ISBN 1555468357.
- Kornbluh, Peter (1997). Electronic Briefing Book No. 5. National Security Archive. Accessed 25 March 2007.
- Lacey, Mark (9 October 2007). "A Revolutionary Icon, and Now, a Bikini". The New York Times.
- Lacey, Mark (26 October 2007). "Lone Bidder Buys Strands of Che's Hair at U.S. Auction". The New York Times.
- Lavretsky, Iosif (1976). Ernesto Che Guevara. Translated by Eklof, A. B. Moscow: Progress Publishers. p. 5. ASIN B000B9V7AW. OCLC 22746662.
- Löwy, Michael (1973). The Marxism of Che Guevara: Philosophy, Economics, Revolutionary Warfare. Monthly Review Press. ISBN 0853452741.
- Luther, Eric (2001). Che Guevara (Critical Lives). Penguin Group (USA). p. 276. ISBN 002864199X.
- McLaren, Peter (2000). Che Guevara, Paulo Freire, and the Pedagogy of Revolution. Rowman & Littlefield. ISBN 0847695336.
- Mittleman, James H. (1981). Underdevelopment and the Transition to Socialism – Mozambique and Tanzania. New York: Academic Press. ISBN 0125006608.
- Moynihan, Michael. "Neutering Sartre at Dagens Nyheter". Stockholm Spectator. Accessed 26 February 2006.
- Che Guevara, by Frank Niess, Haus Publishers Ltd, 2007, ISBN 1904341993.
- O'Hagan, Sean (11 July 2004). "Just a pretty face?". The Observer.
- Ramírez, Dariel Alarcón (1997). Le Che en Bolivie. Paris: Éditions du Rocher. ISBN 2268024377.
- Ramonet, Ignacio (2007). Fidel Castro: My Life. Translated by Hurley, Andrew. London: Penguin Books. ISBN 978-0141026268.
- Ratner, Michael (1997). Che Guevara and the FBI: The U.S. Political Police Dossier on the Latin American Revolutionary. Ocean Press. ISBN 1875284761.
- Rodriguez, Félix I. and John Weisman (1989). Shadow Warrior/the CIA Hero of a Hundred Unknown Battles. New York: Simon & Schuster. ISBN 0671667211.
- Ryan, Henry Butterfield (1998). The Fall of Che Guevara: A Story of Soldiers, Spies, and Diplomats. New York: Oxford University Press. ISBN 0195118790.
- Sandison, David (1996). The Life & Times of Che Guevara. Paragon. ISBN 0752517767.
- Schipani, Andres (23 September 2007). "The Final Triumph of Saint Che". The Observer. (Reporting from La Higuera.)
- Schlesinger, Stephen; Kinzer, Stephen (1982). Bitter Fruit: The Untold Story of the American Coup in Guatemala. Garden City, New York: Doubleday & Company, Inc. ISBN 0385148615.
- Selvage, Major Donald R. – USMC (1 April 1985). Che Guevara in Bolivia.
- Sinclair, Andrew (2006) [1968]. Viva Che!: The Strange Death and Life of Che Guevara. Sutton publishing. ISBN 0750943106.
- Skidmore, Thomas E.; Smith, Peter H. (2008). Modern Latin America. Oxford University Press. p. 436. ISBN 978-0195055337.
- Taibo, Paco Ignacio (II) (1999). Guevara, Also Known as Che (2nd ed.). New York: St Martin's Griffin. ISBN 0312206526.
- "Castro's Brain". Time. 8 August 1960. Archived from the original on 30 September 2020.
- Time Magazine (12 October 1970). "Che: A Myth Embalmed in a Matrix of Ignorance".
- U.S. Army (28 April 1967). Memorandum of Understanding Concerning the Activation, Organization and Training of the 2d Ranger Battalion – Bolivian Army. Accessed 19 June 2006.
- Vargas Llosa, Alvaro (11 July 2005). "The Killing Machine: Che Guevara, from Communist Firebrand to Capitalist Brand". The Independent Institute. Accessed 10 November 2006.
- "World Combined Sources" (2 October 2004). "Che Guevara remains a hero to Cubans". People's Weekly World.
- Wright, Thomas C. (2000). Latin America in the Era of the Cuban Revolution (Revised ed.). Praeger. ISBN 0275967069.
- Villafana, Frank (2017) [1st pub. 2009]. Cold War in the Congo: The Confrontation of Cuban Military Forces, 1960–1967. Abingdon; New York City: Routledge. ISBN 978-1-4128-4766-7.
