= Bibliography of works on Che Guevara =

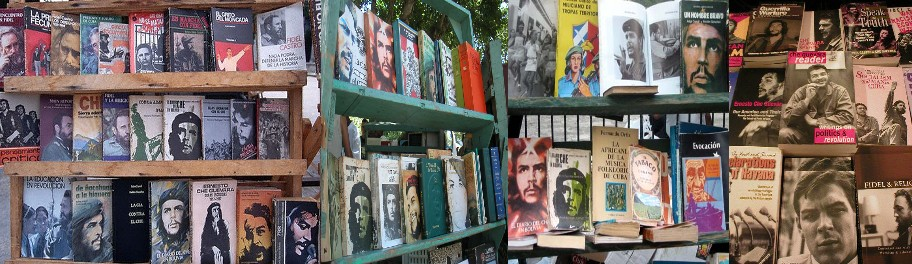

Ernesto "Che" Guevara (June 14, 1928 – October 9, 1967), was an Argentine Marxist revolutionary, politician, author, intellectual, physician, military theorist, and guerrilla leader. His life, legacy, and ideas have attracted a great deal of interest from historians, artists, film makers, musicians, and biographers. In reference to the abundance of material, Nobel Prize–winning author Gabriel García Márquez has declared that "it would take a thousand years and a million pages to write Che's biography."

What follows is an extensive list of English-language works related to Che Guevara, excluding books written by Guevara himself.

== Books ==
=== Best-selling biographies ===
- Che Guevara: A Revolutionary Life, by Jon Lee Anderson, Grove Press, 1998, ISBN 0-8021-3558-7
- Compañero: The Life and Death of Che Guevara, by Jorge G. Castañeda, 1st Vintage Books, 1998, ISBN 0-679-75940-9
- Guevara, Also Known as Che, by Paco Ignacio Taibo II, St. Martin's Griffin, 1999, ISBN 0-312-20652-6

=== Memoirs / accounts by Che's contemporaries ===
- At the Side of Che Guevara: Interviews With Harry Villegas, by Harry "Pombo" Villegas, Pathfinder Press, 1997, ISBN 0-87348-855-5
- Becoming Che: Guevara's Second and Final Trip through Latin America, by Carlos "Calica" Ferrer - Translated from the Spanish by Sarah L. Smith, Marea Editorial, 2006, ISBN 987-1307-07-1
- Che: A Memoir, by Fidel Castro, Ocean Press (AU), 2006, ISBN 1-920888-25-X
- Che's Companeros: Witnesses to A Legend, by Francis Giacobetti & Mauricio Vicent, Editions Assouline, 1997, ISBN 2-84323-039-X
- Che in Africa: Che Guevara's Congo Diary, edited by William Galvez, Ocean Press, 1999, ISBN 1-876175-08-7
- Che Guevara and the Latin American Revolution, by Manuel "Barbarroja" Pineiro, Ocean Press (AU), 2006, ISBN 1-920888-46-2
- Che Guevara and the Latin American Revolutionary Movements, by Manuel "Barbarroja" Pineiro, Ocean Press, 2001, ISBN 1-876175-32-X
- Che's Guerrilla War, by Régis Debray, Penguin books, 1976, ISBN 0-14-021884-X
- Che, My Brother, by Juan Martin Guevara, Polity, 2017, ISBN 1-5095-1775-8
- Che Wants to See You: The Untold Story of Che Guevara, by Ciro Bustos, Verso, 2013, ISBN 1-78168-096-5
- Ernesto: A Memoir of Che Guevara, by Hilda Gadea, Doubleday, 1972, ASIN B000OM10HQ
- Fertile Ground : Che Guevara and Bolivia : a Firsthand Account by Rodolfo Saldaña, Pathfinder Press, 2001, ISBN 0-87348-923-3
- From the Escambray to the Congo: In the Whirlwind of the Cuban Revolution, by Victor Dreke, Pathfinder Press, 2002, ISBN 0-87348-947-0
- Memories of Che, by Guillermo Cabrera and Jonathan Fried, Lyle Stuart, 1987, ISBN 978-0-8184-0385-9
- My Friend Che, by Ricardo Rojo, Dial Press, 1968, ASIN B0006BTUEU
- My Life with Che, by Hilda Gadea, Palgrave Macmillan, 2008, ISBN 0-230-60601-6
- Pombo: A Man With Che Guevara in Bolivia 1966–68, by Harry "Pombo" Villegas, Pathfinder Press, 1997, ISBN 0-87348-833-4
- Remembering Che: My Life with Che Guevara, by Aleida March, Ocean Press, 2012, ISBN 0-9870779-3-7 - English language edition translated by Pilar Aguilar, Seven Stories Press, 2024 ISBN 9781644212059
- Young Che: Memories of Che Guevara by His Father, by Ernesto Guevara Lynch, Vintage Books, 2008, ISBN 0-307-39044-6

=== Biographical ===
- Che Guevara, by Andrew Sinclair, Viking, 1970, ASIN B000UD0VRE
- Che Guevara, by Carlos Tablada, Pathway Pub, 1989, ISBN 0-947083-07-3
- Che Guevara, by David Sandison, St. Martin's Griffin, 1998, ISBN 0-312-18273-2
- Che Guevara, by Fernando Díaz Villanueva, Dastin Export, 2004, ISBN 84-96249-66-2
- Che Guevara, by Frank Niess, Haus Publishers Ltd, 2007, ISBN 1-904341-99-3
- Che Guevara, by Kate Havelin, Twenty First Century Books, 2006, ISBN 0-8225-5951-X
- Che Guevara: A Biography, by Daniel James, Stein & Day Pub, 1969, ISBN 0-8128-1348-0
- Che Guevara: A Biography, by Richard L. Harris, Praeger Pub, 2009, ISBN 0-313-35916-4
- Che Guevara: A Life, by Nick Caistor, Interlink Pub Group, 2009, ISBN 1-56656-759-9
- Che Guevara: An Anthology, by Joseph Hart, Thunder's Mouth Press, 2004, ISBN 1-56025-519-6
- Che Guevara: An Epilogue, by Robert D Hagan, Naval War College, 1969, ASIN B0007HM7UC
- Che Guevara and the Cuban Revolution, by Mike Gonzalez, Bookmarks, 2004, ISBN 1-898876-45-2
- Che Guevara and the Cuban Revolution: Writings and Speeches of Ernesto Che Guevara, by David Deutschmann, Pathfinder, 1987, ISBN 0-947083-02-2
- Che Guevara (Critical Lives), by Eric Luther & Ted Henken, Alpha Books, 2001, ISBN 0-02-864199-X
- Che Guevara, Firebrand Revolutionary, by Michael V. Uschan, Lucent Books, 2006, ISBN 1-59018-970-1
- Che Guevara (Leading Lives), by David Downing, Heinemann Library, 2003, ISBN 1-4034-3493-X
- Che Guevara Reader: Writings by Ernesto Che Guevara on Guerrilla Strategy, Politics & Revolution, edited by David Deutschmann, Ocean Press (AU), 1997, ISBN 1-875284-93-1
- Che: Selected Works of Ernesto Guevara, edited with an introduction by Rolando E. Bonachea and Nelson P. Valdes, MIT Press, 1969, ISBN 0-262-02053-X
- Che: The Life, Death, and Afterlife of a Revolutionary, by Joseph Hart, Basic Books, 2008, ISBN 1-56025-519-6
- Che Guevara: You Win or You Die (grades 6-12), by Stuart A. Kallen, Lerner Publishing Group, 2012, ISBN 978-0-8225-9035-4
- Comandante Che: Guerrilla Soldier, Commander, and Strategist, 1956–1967, by Paul J. Dosal, Penn State University Press, 2003, ISBN 0-271-02261-2
- El Che, by Hugo Gambini, Stock Cero, 2002 ISBN 987-20506-4-3
- Ernesto Che Guevara, by Douglas Kellner, Chelsea House, 1988, ISBN 1-55546-835-7
- Ernesto Che Guevara, by I. Lavretsky, Progress Publishers, 1976, ASIN B000B9V7AW
- Ernesto "Che" Guevara (The Great Hispanic Heritage), by Dennis Abrams, Chelsea House Publications, 2010, ISBN 1-60413-732-0
- Tania, the Woman Che Guevara Loved, by José Antonio Friedl Zapata, Planeta, 1997, ISBN 978-3-351-02465-9
- Tania: Undercover With Che Guevara in Bolivia, by Ulises Estrada, Ocean Press (AU), 2005, ISBN 1-876175-43-5
- Testimonies about Che, Compilation by Marta Rojas, Pablo de la Torriente, 2006, ISBN 959-259-236-5
- The Complete Bolivian Diaries of Che Guevara, and Other Captured Documents, by Daniel James, Cooper Square Press, 2000, ISBN 0-8154-1056-5
- The Life and Times of Che Guevara, by David Sandison, Parragon, 1996, ISBN 0-7525-1776-7
- The Political Theory of Che Guevara, by Renzo Llorente, Rowman & Littlefield, 2018, ISBN 1-78348-716-X
- The Story of Che Guevara, by Lucía Álvarez de Toledo, Quercus Publishing, 2010, ISBN 1-84916-032-5

=== Analysis / commentary ===
- A Brave Man, by Adys Cupull & Froilan Gonzalez, Editorial Jose Marti, 1997, ISBN 959-09-0104-2
- Analysis of the Military Strategies and Warfare Principles of Che Guevara and Fidel Castro During the Cuban Revolution, by Monte H Callen, Air Command and Staff College, 1985, ASIN B0006YU47Y
- Che and Fidel: A Deep Friendship, by Ornan Batista, Editorial Capitan San Luis, 2004, ISBN 959-211-264-9
- Che Guevara and the Coming World Revolution, by Rico Dean, CreateSpace, 2008, ISBN 1-4404-7539-3
- Che Guevara and the Economic Debate in Cuba, by Luiz Bernardo Pericás, Atropos Press, 2009, ISBN 0-9819462-8-3
- Che Guevara and the FBI: The U.S. Political Police Dossier on the Latin American Revolutionary, by Michael Ratner, Ocean Press (AU), 1997, ISBN 1-875284-76-1
- Che Guevara and the Fight for Socialism Today: Cuba Confronts the World Crisis of the '90s, by Mary-Alice Waters, Pathfinder Press (NY), 1992, ISBN 0-87348-760-5
- Che Guevara and the Incurable Disease, by Felix M.D. Fernandez-Madrid, Dorrance Publishing, 1997, ISBN 0-8059-4087-1
- Che Guevara and the Latin American Revolutionary Movements, by Manuel Piñeiro Losada, Ocean Press, 2001, ISBN 1-876175-32-X
- Che Guevara and the Imperialist Reality, by Mary-Alice Waters, Pathfinder Press, 1998, ISBN 0-87348-899-7
- Che Guevara: Economics and Politics in the Transition to Socialism, by Carlos Tablada, Pathfinder Press (NY), 1998, ISBN 0-87348-876-8
- Che Guevara: His Revolutionary Legacy, by Oliver Besancenot & Michael Löwy, Monthly Review Press, 2009, ISBN 1-58367-177-3
- Che Guevara: Icon, Myth, and Message, by David Kunzle, UCLA, 1997, ISBN 0-930741-59-5
- Che Guevara: In Search of Revolution, (Library Binding Grades 7 and up) by Calvin Craig Miller, Morgan Reynolds Publishing, 2006, ISBN 1-931798-93-1
- Che Guevara on Revolution: A Documentary Overview, by Jay Mallin, University of Miami Press, 1969
- Che Guevara, Paulo Freire, and the Pedagogy of Revolution, by Peter McLaren, Rowman & Littlefield Publishers, 2000, ISBN 0-8476-9533-6
- Che Guevara: Symbol of Struggle, by Tony Saunois, Socialist Books, 2005, ISBN 1-870958-34-9 → Read Online
- Che Guevara: The Economics of Revolution, by Helen Yaffe, Palgrave Macmillan, 2009, ISBN 0-230-21821-0. Link
- Che Guevara: The Failure of a Revolutionary, by Leo Sauvage, Prentice-Hall, 1973, ISBN 0-13-128330-8
- Che Guevara: The Iconoclast, by Bikas Chakrabarti, Progressive Publishers, 2000, ISBN 81-86383-83-2
- Che in Verse, edited by Gavin O'Toole and Georgina Jiménez, Aflame Books, 2007, ISBN 0-9552339-5-X
- Che on My Mind, by Margaret Randall, Duke University Press Books, 2013, ISBN 0-8223-5592-2
- Che's Travels: The Making of a Revolutionary in 1950s Latin America, by Paulo Drinot, Duke University Press, 2010, ISBN 0-8223-4767-9
- Che: The Making of a Legend, by Martin Ebon, Universe books, 1969, ISBN 0-87663-100-6
- Che Guevara: The Making of a Revolutionary, by Samuel Willard Crompton, Gareth Stevens Publishing, 2009, ISBN 1-4339-0053-X
- Children of Che: Childcare and Education in Cuba, by Karen Wald, Ramparts Press, 1978, ISBN 0-87867-064-5
- Cuba Libre!: Che, Fidel, and the Improbable Revolution That Changed World History, by Tony Perrottet, Blue Rider Press, 2019, ISBN 0-7352-1816-1
- Daybreak at La Higuera: Unraveling Enigmas Surrounding Che Guevara's Final hours at La Higuera, by Rafael Cerrato, CreateSpace Independent, 2013, ISBN 1-4819-5976-X
- Death of a Revolutionary: Che Guevara's Last Mission, by Richard L. Harris, W. W. Norton & Company, 2007, ISBN 0-393-33094-X
- Ernesto Che Guevara: Ethics and Aesthetics of an Existence, by Pedro Luis Sotolongo, Editorial José Martí, 2002, ISBN 959-09-0213-8
- Ernesto 'Che' Guevara: Modern Revolutionary, by Jay Mallin, Samhar Pr, 1973, ISBN 0-87157-556-6
- Exposing the Real Che Guevara: And the Useful Idiots Who Idolize Him, by Humberto Fontova, Sentinel HC, 2007, ISBN 1-59523-027-0
- Fidel and Che: A Revolutionary Friendship, by Simon Reid-Henry, Walker & Company, 2009, ISBN 0-8027-1573-7
- Fidel Castro's Tribute to Che Guevara, by Fidel Castro, Merit, 1967, ASIN B0007ERDSG
- Great Rebel: Che Guevara in Bolivia, by Luis J. Gonzales, Grove Press, 1969, ISBN 0-394-17156-X
- Guerrilla Movements in Latin America, by Richard Gott, Thomas Nelson & Sons, 1970, ISBN 0-17-138038-X
- How the CIA Killed Che: The Murder of a Revolutionary, by Michael Ratner and Michael Steven Smith, Skyhorse, 2016, ISBN 1-5107-1101-5
- Hunting Che: How a U.S. Special Forces Team Helped Capture the World's Most Famous Revolutionary, by Mitch Weiss & Kevin Maurer, Berkley, 2014, ISBN 0-425-25747-9
- José Martí, Ernesto "Che" Guevara, and Global Development Ethics: The Battle for Ideas, by Susan E. Babbitt, Palgrave Macmillan, 2014, ISBN 1-137-41322-0
- Notes on Ernesto Che Guevara's Ideas on Pedagogy, by Lidia Turner Martî, Fernwood Publishing, 2014, ISBN 1-55266-652-2
- Revolution and Revolutionaries: Guerrilla Movements in Latin America, by Daniel Castro, Rowman & Littlefield, 1999, ISBN 0-8420-2626-6
- The Black Beret: The Life and Meaning of Che Guevara, by Marvin D. Resnick, Ballantine, 1970
- The Che Handbook, by Gareth Jenkins, MQ Publications Ltd, 2003, ISBN 1-84072-502-8
- The Che Guevara Myth and the Future of Liberty, by Alvaro Vargas Llosa, Independent Institute, 2006, ISBN 1-59813-005-6
- The CIA Against Che, by Adys Cupull & Froilan Gonzalez, Editorial Capitan San Luis, 2007, ISBN 978-959-211-314-5
- The Defeat of Che Guevara: Military Response to Guerilla Challenge in Bolivia, by Gary Prado Salmon, John Deredita, & Lawrence H. Hall, Praeger Publishers, 1990, ISBN 0-275-93211-7
- The Fall of Che Guevara: A Story of Soldiers, Spies, and Diplomats, by Henry Butterfield Ryan, Oxford University Press, 1999, ISBN 0-19-513100-2
- The Fat Capitalist's Song on the Death of Che Guevara, by Times Change Press, 1970, ISBN 0-87810-003-2
- That Fateful Day in La Higuera: Unraveling enigmas surrounding Che Guevara's Final hours at La Higuera, by Rafael Cerrato, CreateSpace, 2016, ISBN 1-5307-7612-0
- The First and Second Declarations of Havana: Manifestos of Revolutionary Struggle in the Americas Adopted by the Cuban People, by Mary-Alice Waters, Pathfinder Press, 2007, ISBN 0-87348-869-5
- The Future of Che Guevara, by Hans Koningsberger, Doubleday & Company, 1971, ASIN B000GLDYQU
- The Latin American Revolution: Politics and Strategy from Apro-Marxism to Guevarism, by Donald Clark Hodges, W. Morrow, 1974, ISBN 0-688-00315-X
- The Legacy of Che Guevara: A Documentary Study, by Donald Clark Hodges, Thames and Hudson, 1977, ISBN 0-500-25056-1
- The Marxism of Che Guevara: Philosophy, Economics, Revolutionary Warfare, by Michael Löwy, Rowman & Littlefield Publishers, 2007, ISBN 0-7425-3903-2
- The Murder of Che Guevara, by Steve Reynolds, Wild Geese Pub Co, 1984, ISBN 0-918379-25-3
- The New Left: Six Critical Essays on Che Guevara, by Maurice Cranston, The Bodley Head, 1970, ASIN B000VB6PZW
- The New Man in Cuba: Culture and Identity in the Revolution, by Ana Serra, University Press of Florida, 2007, ISBN 0-8130-3072-2
- The Politics of Che Guevara: Theory and Practice, by Samuel Farber, Haymarket Books, 2016, ISBN 978-1-60846-601-6
- The Revolution Will Not Be Capitalized: Che Guevara, by Charles Carreon, American Buddha, Amazon Digital Services, 2008, ASIN B0013ENSJC
- Third World Series, Viva Che, by Marianne Alexandre, Lorrimer, 1969, ASIN B000LAN6T6
- Venceremos! The Speeches and Writings of Che Guevara, by John Gerassi, London. Weidenfeld, 1968, ISBN 0-297-76438-1
- Viva Che !: Contributions in Tribute to Ernesto 'Che' Guevara, by Marianne Sinclair, Lorrimer Publishing, 1968, ISBN 1-898876-45-2
- Viva Che!: The Strange Death and Life of Che Guevara, by Andrew Sinclair, Sutton Publishing, 2006, ISBN 0-7509-4310-6
- Who Killed Che?: How the CIA Got Away With Murder, by Michael Ratner and Michael Steven Smith, OR books, 2011, ISBN 978-1-935928-49-2. review with video

=== Comic books / graphic novels ===
- Biographical Novel Che Guevara, by Kiyoshi Konno & Chie Shimano, Emotional Content, 2009
- Che: A Graphic Biography, by Sid Jacobson & Ernie Colon, Hill and Wang, 2009, ISBN 0-8090-9492-4. Link
- Che: A Graphic Biography, by Spain Rodriguez, Verso, May 2008, ISBN 1-84467-168-2. Video
- Che: A Revolutionary Life, by Jon Lee Anderson (author) and José Hernández (Illustrator), Penguin Press, 2018, ISBN 0-7352-2177-4
- Che Guevara: A Manga Biography, by Kiyoshi Konno & Chie Shimano, Penguin, 2010, ISBN 0-14-311816-1
- Che Guevara For Beginners, by Sergio Sinjay, Writers & Readers, 1997, ISBN 0-86316-256-8
- Life of Che: An Impressionistic Biography, by Héctor Germán Oesterheld & Alberto Breccia, Fantagraphics, 2022, ISBN 1-68396-522-1
- Stars Over Latin America, by M. Earl Smith, Michelkin Publishing, 2018, ISBN 0-9995222-4-8
- The Epic & True* Life Story of Che Guevara, by Ian Harker, Triumvirate Press, 2005
- The Last Days of Che Guevara: A Graphic Novel, by Marco Rizzo and Lelio Bonaccorso, Red Quill Books, 2013, ISBN 978-1-926958-30-9

=== Fictional novels ===
- A Girl Like Che Guevara, by Teresa De La Caridad Doval, Soho Press, 2005, ISBN 1-56947-397-8
- A Kiss for Señor Guevara, by Terence Clarke, Booklocker Inc, 2010, ISBN 1-60910-219-3
- Becoming Tania: A Novel of Love, Revolution and Betrayal, by Ian Adams, McClelland & Stewart, 1990, ISBN 0-7710-0656-X
- Blood Red Square, by Pat Mullan, LBF Books, 2007, ISBN 0-9773082-5-1
- Brief Encounters with Che Guevara: Stories, by Ben Fountain, Harper Perennial, 2007, ISBN 0-06-088560-2
- Che's Last Stand, by William E. Dempsey, CreateSpace, 2017, ISBN 1-9761-4294-6
- I, Che Guevara: A Novel, by John Blackthorn, William Morrow & Company, 2000, ISBN 0-688-16760-8
- Killing Che: A Novel, by Chuck Pfarrer, Random House, 2007, ISBN 1-4000-6393-0
- Loving Che, by Ana Menèndez, Atlantic Monthly Press, 2003, ISBN 0-87113-908-1
- Operation Che Guevara, by Nick Carter, Award Books, 1969, ASIN B000H2AC3G
- See you Later Alligator, by William F. Buckley Jr., Doubleday, 1988, ISBN 0-385-19442-0
- Special Ops, A Brotherhood of War Novel, by W.E.B. Griffin, 2002, Jove Fiction, ISBN 0-515-13248-9
- The Death of Che Guevara, by Jay Cantor, Vintage, 2005, ISBN 0-375-71383-2
- The Ghost of Che Guevara, by Jason Webb, Macmillan UK, 2006, ISBN 0-230-00100-9
- The Man Who Fingered Che Guevara: Confession of a Cuban Double-Agent, by Frank Belsito, 1993, ISBN 1-56002-224-8

=== Photography ===
- Che's Afterlife: The Legacy of an Image, by Michael Casey, Vintage Books USA, 2009, ISBN 0-307-27930-8
- Che & Fidel: Images from History, by Aleida March, Ocean Press, 2015, ISBN 1-925019-41-1
- Che Guevara: By the Photographers of the Cuban Revolution, by Nene Burri, Patricia Meyer, Saúl Corrales, Carlos Torres Cairo, Ediciones Aurelia, 2003, ISBN 84-607-9547-0
- Che Guevara: Revolutionary and Icon, by Trisha Ziff, Abrams Image, 2006, ISBN 0-8109-5718-3
- Che Guevara's Face: How a Cuban Photographer's Image Became a Cultural Icon, by Danielle Smith-Llera, Compass Point Books, 2016, ISBN 0-7565-5442-X
- Che: Images of a Revolutionary, by Oscar Sola, Pluto Press, 2000, ISBN 0-7453-1700-6
- Che: The Photobiography of Che Guevara, Thunder's Mouth Press, 1998, ISBN 1-56025-187-5
- Chesucristo: The Fusion in Image and Word of Che Guevara and Jesus Christ, by David Kunzle, De Gruyter, 2015, ISBN 3-11-035215-X
- Fidel's Cuba: A Revolution in Pictures, by Osvaldo Salas, Atria Books, 1999, ISBN 1-56025-245-6
- Las Manos de Guevara (English title: The Hands of Che Guevara), by Evgenii Dolmatovskii, Planeta, 1974
- Revolucion!: Cuban Poster Art, by Lincoln Cushing, Chronicle Books, 2003, ISBN 0-8118-3582-0
- Self Portrait Che Guevara, by Victor Casaus, Ocean Press, 2008, ISBN 1-876175-82-6. Review
- The Ghosts of Ñancahuazú, by Leandro Katz, photographs by Freddy Alborta, essays by John Berger, Jean Franco, Eduardo Grüner, Jeffrey Skoller, and Mariano Mestman, Viper's Tongue Books, 2010, Spanish and English edition, ISBN 987-24581-1-1
- The Semiotics of Che Guevara: Affective Gateways, by Maria-Carolina Cambre, Bloomsbury Academic, 2015, ISBN 1-4725-0523-9
- Cuba by Korda, by Alberto Korda, Seven Stories Press, 2024, ISBN 9781644212134

=== Travelogues ===
- A Ghost of Che: A Motorcycle Ride Through Space, Time, Life and Love, by Mauktik Kulkarni, iUniverse, 2009, ISBN 1-4401-6109-7
- Chasing Che: A Motorcycle Journey in Search of the Guevara Legend, by Patrick Symmes, Vintage, 2000, ISBN 0-375-70265-2
- Che Guevara and the Mountain of Silver: By Bicycle and Train through South America, by Anne Mustoe, Virgin Books, 2008, ISBN 0-7535-1274-2
- Che's Chevrolet, Fidel's Oldsmobile: On the Road in Cuba, by Richard Schweid, University of North Carolina Press, 2008, ISBN 0-8078-5887-0
- Che's Route: Ernesto Che Guevara Trip Across South America, by de Dios Editores, 2004, ISBN 987-9445-29-5
- Looking for Mr. Guevara: A Journey through South America, by Barbara Brodman, iUniverse, 2001 ISBN 0-595-18069-8
- Roll Over Che Guevara: Travels of a Radical Reporter, by Mark Cooper, Verso, 1996, ISBN 1-85984-065-5
- The Che Diaries: Notes on a Multi-Dimensional Evolutionary Journey, by Ave Guevara, AuthorHouse, 2008, ISBN 1-4389-1019-3 - Site
- To Infinity and Beyond: What Che Guevara Started, Somebody had to Finish, by Stephen Holmes, Infinite Ideas, 2011, ISBN 1-906821-90-9
- Traveling with Che Guevara: The Making of a Revolutionary, by Alberto Granado, Newmarket Press, 2004, ISBN 1-55704-639-5

== Media ==
=== Documentaries ===
- Aleida Guevara Remembers Her Father, Che, 2006, (34 min). Ocean Press (AU), Starring Aleida Guevara.
- Biography: Che Guevara Restless, 2000, (50 min). A & E Home Video.
- Che, Discovery Networks Europe, 1995, (50 min). Directed by Anthony Geffen. Watch
- Che Guevara As You Have Never Seen Him Before, 2007, (55 min). Directed by Manuel Perez Paredes.
- Che Guevara: Guerrilla to the End, 1998, (45 min). Journeyman Pictures.
- Che Guevara: Hasta La Victoria Siempre, 2008, (54 min). Kultur White Star.
- Che Guevara: Kordavision, 2008, (87 min). Directed by Hector Cruz Sandoval.
- Che Guevara: The Body And The Legend, (52 min). Directed by Stefano Missio. Writers: Raffaele Brunetti and Stefano Missio.
- Che Guevara The Myth and His Mission, (55 min). Directed by Claudio Trovo.
- Che Guevara: Where You'D Never Imagine Him, 2004, (55 min). Directed by Manuel Pérez.
- Che: Love, Politics, and Rebelry, Mundo Latino, 1995, (45 min). Directed by Teresita Gomez.
- Che: Rise And Fall, 2007, (64 min). Directed by Eduardo Montes-Bradley. National Geographic Channel. Site
- "Che" The Last Hours, 2003, (60 min). Victoria Media, Written and Directed by Romano Scavolini. Site
- Che, The Sweet Dream of the Cane, 2005, (30 min). Directed by Mahmoud Reza Sani.
- Che, Un Hombre Nuevo (Che, A New Man), 2010, (120 min). Directed by Tristán Bauer. Site - Article - Trailer
- Chevolution, 2008, Red Envelope Entertainment. Produced by Trisha Ziff & Directed by Luis Lopez. Trailer
- Democracy Now: The Life and Legacy of Che Guevara, 2007. (33 min). Watch
- El Che, Cinétévé, 1997, (96 min). Directed by Maurice Dugowson.
- El Che And Tracing Che, 2004, (187 min). Castle Home Video, Directed by Lawrence Elman.
- El Che: Investigating a Legend, 1991, (95 min). Kultur Video.
- El Che Guevara, Dutch Film Works, 2006, (96 min). Directed by Aníbal Di Salvo.
- Ernesto Che Guevara, The Bolivian Diary, 1996, (94 min). Directed by Richard Dindo.
- Freddy Ilanga: Che's Swahili Translator, 2009, (24 min). Directed by Katrin Hansing. Trailer
- Hasta Siempre, Rice n Peas, 2005, (58 min). Directed by Ishmail Blagrove Jr.
- Kordavision, Starz, 2008, (87 min). Directed by Héctor Cruz Sandoval.
- People's Century - Guerrilla Wars: Cuba, Vietnam, and Afghanistan, 1998, (60 min). BBC, Directed by Bill Treharne Jones.
- Personal Che, 2008, Directed by Adriana Mariño and Douglas Duarte. Official Website
- Rebels of the Sierra Maestra: The Story of Cuba's Jungle Fighters, 1957. Report by Robert Taber for CBS News.
- "Red Chapters - A Rebel with a Cause: Death of a Man, Birth of a Legend". Parthenon Entertainment. 1999. Archived from the original on February 12, 2011.
- Sacrificio: Who Betrayed Che Guevara, 2001, (59 min). Directed by Erik Gandini and Tarik Saleh, SVT. Trailer
- San Ernesto de La Higuera, 2006. Directed by Isabel Santos, produced by ICAIC.
- The Hands of Che Guevara, 2006, (59 min). Directed by Peter De Kock. Site
- The True Story of Che Guevara, The History Channel, 2007, (90 min). Directed by Maria Wye Berry. Watch Here, Site, Review
- Who Betrayed Che Guevara ?, (57 min). Swedish journalist's Erik Gandini and Tarik Saleh. Some Subtitles.

=== Theatrical films ===
- Che (Part 1 & Part 2), 2009, Directed by Steven Soderbergh, Starring Benicio del Toro as "Che", IFC Films. Trailer
- Che!, 1969, (96 min), Directed by Richard Fleischer.
- CHE, 2008, Directed by Josh Evans & Starring Eduardo Noriega as "Che". Trailer
- Fidel & Che, Showtime, 2005, (204 min). Directed by David Attwood.
- The Motorcycle Diaries, 2004, (126 min), Spanish with subtitles. Directed by Walter Salles. Trailer

=== Avant-garde films ===
- Che Comandante Amigo, 1977, (17 min), Directed by Bernabé Hernández, ICAIC (Cuban Cinema Institute)
- El Día Que Me Quieras (The Day You'll Love Me), 1997, (30 min), Directed by Leandro Katz, Icarus Films. Site - Review
- Utopia, 1998, (93 min), Directed by James Benning, Canyon Cinema. Review

=== Musicals/plays ===
- Che!, by Lennox Raphael, Production: 1969, New York.
- Che Guevara, Theatre Play by Mario Fratti, Productions: Toronto, Canada 1968–1969, Workshop Theatre.
- Che Guevara, Produced by Yuan Hong, Productions: 2001 Beijing, 2001 Hong Kong, 2001 Henan Province, 2001 Guangzhou. Article
- Che Guevara, Written by Zhang Guangtian, Productions: 2007 Beijing China, 2008 China Art Institute. Article
- Che Guevara on the Fringe, Written by Kieran Butler & Austin Low, Directed by Evonne Keron, Productions: 2005, 2006 & 2007 Edinburgh Festival, Royal Mile. Site
- Che'r Cycle, Written by Mamunur Rashid and directed by Faiz Zahir, 2009 Bangladesh, Bangla Theatre. Article
- Che: The Argentine Musical, Created by Oscar Mangione & Oscar Laiguera, Directed by Daniel Suarez, 2009 Buenos Aires. Article
- Evita, Music by Andrew Lloyd Webber, Productions: 1976 concept album, 1978 West End, 1979 Broadway, 1996 Film, 2006 West End revival.
- Guerrillas, by Rolf Hochhuth, Production: 1970
- Risky Revolutionary, Written by Fred Newman, Directed by David Nackman, 2010 New York City Castillo Theatre. Article
- School of the Americas (about Che's last 2 days alive), written by José Rivera, Productions: 2007 New York, 2008 San Francisco. Article

=== Audio CDs ===
- Chante Cuba: Best of Carlos Puebla, by Carlos Puebla, Edenways, 2003, ASIN B00004VNKD
- Che Guevara, by Thomas Thieme, Der Audio Verlag, 2004, ASIN B00022GI66
- Che Guevara: A Dream of Land and Freedom, by Up Bustle & Out, Ninja Tune, 1997, ASIN B000003S8P
- Che Guevara: Lucha por La Vida, by Various Artists, Wea International, 2007, ASIN B000V7UMTG
- Commandante Che Guevara, by Nicholas Menheim & Le Super Sabador, Popular African Music, 2002, ASIN B00007K23X
- El Che Vive: A Tribute to Che Guevera, by Various Artists, Last Call Records, 1997, ASIN B0000049Z2
- Fall of Che Guevara, by Ryan Henry Butterfield, Blackstone Audio Inc., 2006, ISBN 0-7861-6084-5
- Hasta Siempre Comandante: 30 Anos Después, by Various Artists, Tumi Records, 1997, ASIN B00004TKPC
- Por Siempre Che, by Various Artists, Ayva Musica, 2003.
- "Quinteto Rebelde, Bis Music, 2001 site
- Romono Che Guevara, by Michael Hametner, 2007, ASIN B000L43OP8
- Tribute to Che Guevara, 2008, ASIN B00125ZILI

== Academia ==
=== Journal articles ===
- A New Old Che Guevara Interview, by William E. Ratliff, The Hispanic American Historical Review, Vol. 46, No. 3 (Aug 1966), pp. 288–300
- An Historical Critique of the Emergence and Evolution of Ernesto Che Guevara's Foco Theory, by Matt D. Childs, Journal of Latin American Studies, Vol. 27, No. 3, (October 1995), pp. 593–624
- Attention Deficit Hyperactivity Disorder and the Behavior of Che Guevara, by Hélio A.G. Teive et al., Journal of Clinical Neuroscience, (December 2008). pdf
- Che Guevara and Contemporary Revolutionary Movements, by James Petras, Latin American Perspectives, Vol. 25, No. 4, (Jul 1998), pp. 9–18
- Che Guevara and Guerrilla Warfare: Training for Today's Nonlinear Battlefields, by US Army Captain Steve Lewis, Military Review, (September–October 2001), pp. 58–61. pdf
- Che Guevara: Apostle of War, by William Ratliff, Hoover Digest, Stanford University, No. 1, (2008). link
- Che Guevara's New Man: Embodying a Communitarian Attitude, by Miguel Martinez-Saenz, Latin American Perspectives, Vol. 31, No. 6, (2004), pp. 15–30
- Che Guevara on Guerrilla Warfare: Doctrine, Practice and Evaluation, by Jose A. Moreno, Comparative Studies in Society and History, Vol. 12, No. 2 (April 1970), pp. 114–133
- Che Guevara, Paulo Freire, and the Politics of Hope: Reclaiming Critical Pedagogy, by Dr. Peter McLaren, Cultural Studies Critical Methodologies, Vol. 1, No. 1, (February 2001) pp. 108–131. pdf
- Che Guevara's Final Verdict on the Soviet Economy, by John Riddell, International Journal of Socialist Renewal, (June 2008). link
- Che Guevara: Some Documentary Puzzles at the End of a Long Journey, by Jay Mallin, Journal of Inter-American Studies, Vol. 10, No. 1 (Jan 1968), pp. 74–84
- Che Guevara: The Moral Factor, by John Berger, The Urban Review, Volume 8, Number 3 (September 1975) pp. 202–208.
- Chesucristo: Fusions, Myths, and Realities, by David Kunzle, Latin American Perspectives, Vol. 35, No. 2, (2008) pp. 97–115
- Copyrighting Che: Art and Authorship under Cuban Late Socialism, by Ariana Hernández-Reguant, Public Culture, Volume 16, Number 1, (2004), pp. 1–30
- Ernesto Che Guevara R.I.P., by Murray Rothbard, Left and Right: A Journal of Libertarian Thought, Volume 3, Number 3 (Spring-Autumn 1967) pdf
- Guevara's Great Adventure, by Eric Johnson, Progressive Labor Party Magazine: A Journal of Communist Theory and Practice, (1969), pp. 53–58. pdf
- Guevara is Dead: Long Live Guevara by Bjorn Kumm, Transition, No. 75/76, The Anniversary Issue: Selections from Transition, 1961–1976 (1997), pp. 30–38.
- History, Myth and Che Guevara, by John Hess, Film-Historia, Vol. IX, No.2, (1999), pp. 183–188. pdf
- In Memoriam and Struggle: Che Guevara, by Nicolas Guillen, Latin American Perspectives, Vol. 14, No. 4, Contemporary Issues (Autumn, 1987), pp. 419–421.
- Reflections on Che Guevara's Legacy, by Richard Harris, Latin American Perspectives, Vol. 25, No. 4, (July 1998), pp. 19–32
- Revolutionary Leadership and Pedagogical Praxis: Revisiting the Legacy of Che Guevara, by Dr. Peter McLaren, International Journal of Leadership in Education, Volume 2, Number 3, (July 1, 1999), pp. 269–292
- The Legacy of Che Guevara, by Norman Gall, Commentary Magazine, (December 1967) pp. 1–14. pdf
- The Resurrection of Che Guevara, by Samuel Farber, New Politics, Volume 7, Number 1, (Summer 1998). Link
- ¿ Venceremos o Venderemos?: The Transnationalization and Neiman Marxistization of the Icon of Che Guevara, by Denise Blum, Cuban Transnationalism, University Press of Florida, (2005)

=== Presented papers ===
- "Che" Guevara and the Rise of the Pop Martyr, by Kerry Dobransky (Northwestern University), Paper presented at the annual meeting of the American Sociological Association, Aug 12 2005.
- Che Guevara's Bolivia Campaign: Thirty Years of Controversy, by Matilde Zimmermann (Vassar College), Paper presented at the 1998 Meeting of the Latin American Studies Association, September 24–26, 1998. pdf
- Generations, Identities, and the Collective Memory of Che Guevara, by Jeff A. Larson (University of Arizona) & Omar Lizado (University of Notre Dame), Sociological Forum, 2006. pdf
- Hardt, Hanno; Rivera-Perez, Luis; Calles-Santillana, Jorge A. "U.S. Media and the Deconstruction of a Revolutionary Life". che-lives.com. Archived from the original on November 15, 2008.

=== Master Theses and Doctoral Dissertations ===
- Domingues, Juan de Moraes. Che Guevara : a mídia como potencializadora do mito. 2008. PUCRS, MA Thesis.
- Maya Neto, Olegario da Costa. Actualizing Che's History: Che Guevara's Enduring Relevance Through Film. 2017. UFSC, MA Thesis.
