= Legacy of Che Guevara =

Impact of Argentine revolutionary

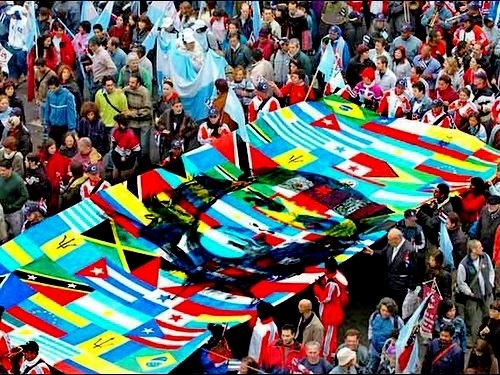
A display by protestors depicting Guerrillero Heroico superimposed upon flags of many countries

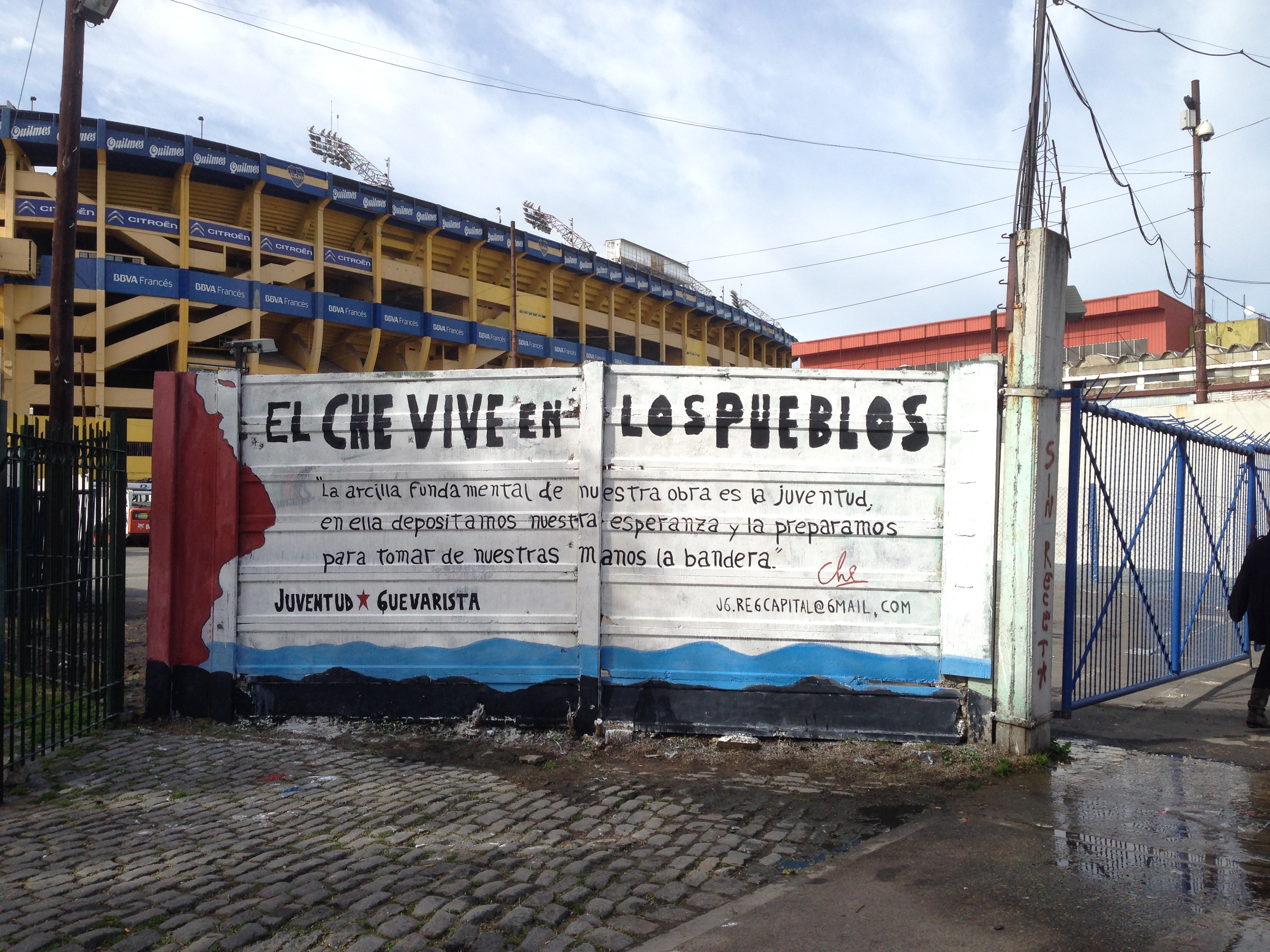
Graffiti translating to "Che lives in the villages" in Argentina

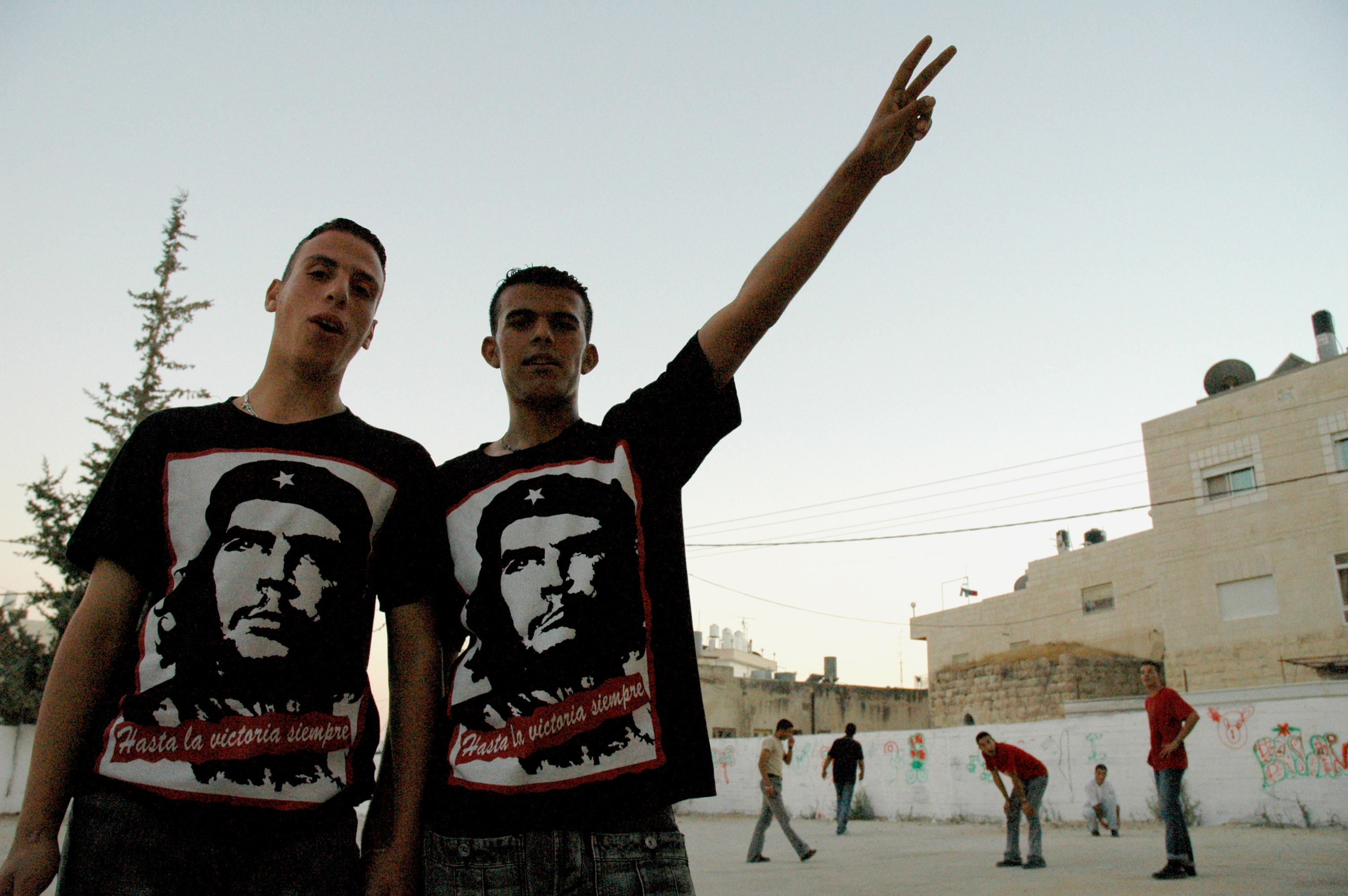
Palestinians wearing Che Guevara T-shirts

The legacy of Argentine Marxist revolutionary Che Guevara (May 14, 1928 – October 9, 1967) is constantly evolving in the collective imagination. As a symbol of counterculture worldwide, Guevara is one of the most recognizable and influential revolutionary figures of the twentieth century. However, during his life, and even more since his death, Che has elicited controversy and divergent opinions on his personal character and actions. He has been both revered and reviled, being characterized as everything from a heroic defender of the oppressed and poor, to an executioner and the "Butcher Of la Cabaña".

== History ==
=== Writings ===
Guevara's extensive written legacy includes intellectual writings on radical Marxist politics and social theory, military/guerrilla warfare strategy and tactics, diplomatic memos, books, speeches, magazine articles, letters, poetry and diaries, as well as official documents preserved in Cuban government archives. Che's practical and theoretical work had a profound political impact around the globe during the second half of the 20th century, especially in the developing world, where revolutionary organizing and anti-colonial struggles were inspired by his thought and example. As a consequence, his writings have been translated into hundreds of different languages.

=== Martyrdom ===
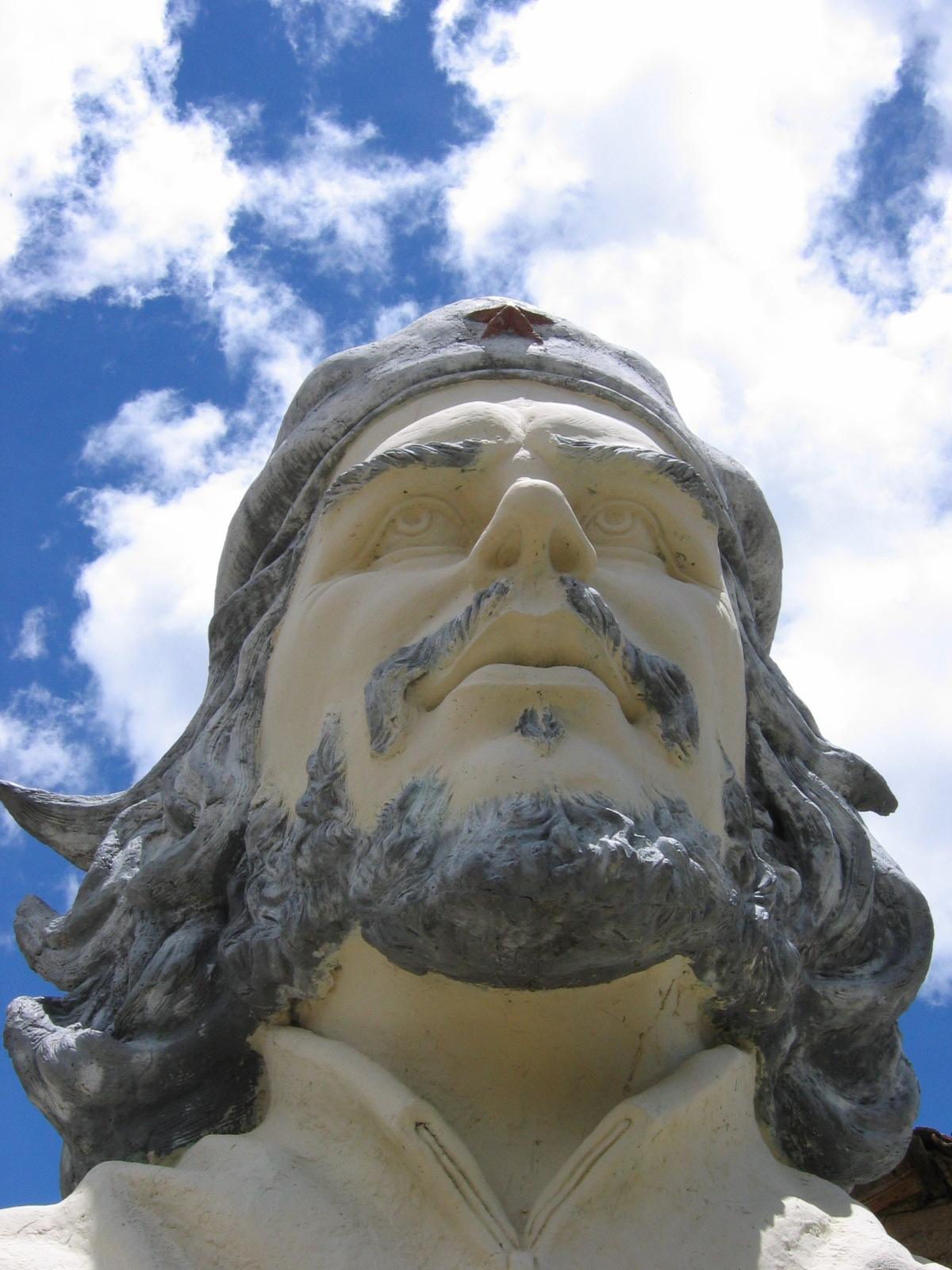
Statue of Che Guevara near the site of his execution in Bolivia.

In 1967, while pictures of Guevara's dead body were being circulated and the circumstances of his death debated, his legend began to spread. Demonstrations in protest against his execution occurred throughout the world, and articles, tributes, songs and poems were written about his life and death. Latin America specialists advising the U.S. State Department immediately recognized the significance in the demise of "the most glamorous and reportedly most successful revolutionary", noting that Guevara would be eulogized by communists and other leftists as a "model revolutionary who met a heroic death."

British politician George Galloway has remarked that "one of the greatest mistakes the US state ever made was to create those pictures of Che's corpse. Its Christ-like poise in death ensured that his appeal would reach way beyond the turbulent university campus and into the hearts of the faithful, flocking to the worldly, fiery sermons of the liberation theologists." The Economist magazine has also pointed out how Che's post death photos resemble Andrea Mantegna's The Lamentation over the Dead Christ. Thus fixing Guevara as a modern saint, the man who risked his life twice in countries that were not his own before giving it in a third, and whose invocation of the "new man", driven by moral rather than material incentives, smacked of Saint Ignatius of Loyola more than Marx.

This rung true the following year in 1968 when among Italy's emerging new breed of Catholic militants, named the Jacques Maritain Circle, arranged a memorial Mass in Che's honor and Catholic services were held for him in several other countries. In addition, in Brazil, mythmakers began to circulate thousands of photograph copies of a dead Che captioned "A Saint of Our Time". Italian students took up a similar tone and christened Guevara an angela della pace—"angel of peace." Regardless of Che's non-sanctifying failures and contradictions, the potency of his "messianic image", with its "symbolic" and "religious quality", continues to inspire many throughout the world.

=== Political symbol ===
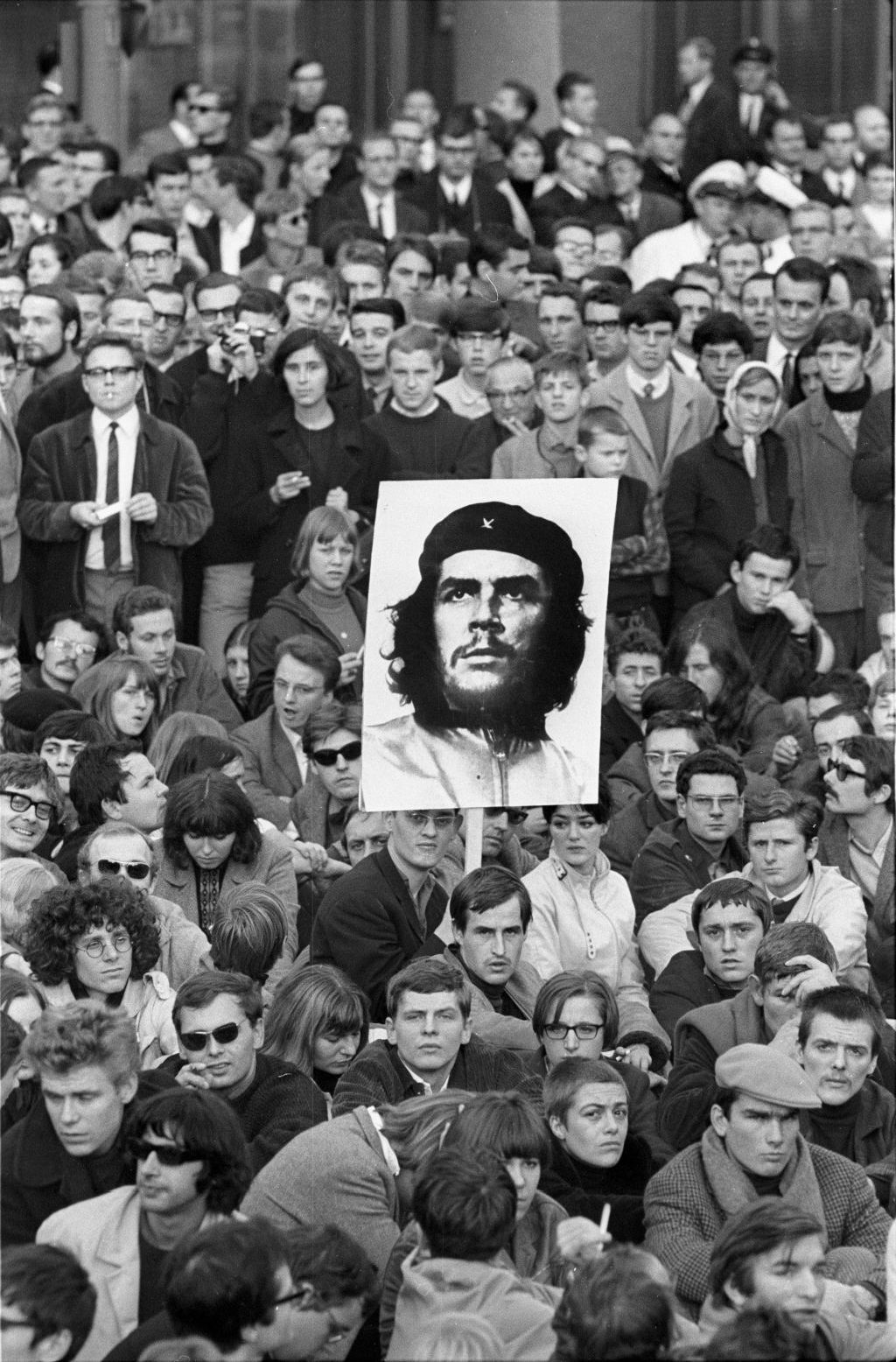
West German protesters holding up a Che portrait during the 1968 protests.

"Through the image, the complexities of Che's life and thought are reprocessed into an abstraction that can serve any cause. It has been painted as graffiti in Bethlehem, carried in demonstrations from Palestine to Mexico and borrowed by such artists as Pedro Meyer, Vik Muniz, Martin Parr and Annie Leibovitz. It has been used to represent causes as diverse as world trade, anti-Americanism, teenage rebellion and Latin American identity."

— Isabel Hilton, New Statesman

Guevara, who has been variously described as "the rock-hero biker revolutionary", "the martyr to idealism", and "James Dean in fatigues"; became a potent secular symbol of rebellion and revolution during the May 1968 protests in France. In the view of The Guardian's Gary Younge, "(Che's) journey from middle-class comfort to working-class champion and his long-haired unkempt look, mirrored the aspirations and self-image of the Woodstock generation as they demonstrated against the Vietnam war." For her part, the 1960s literary icon Susan Sontag spoke glowingly of the "inspiring beautiful legend" that was Guevara, comparing him Lord Byron, Emiliano Zapata, and José Martí. Moreover, the slogan Che lives! began to appear on walls throughout the West, while Jean-Paul Sartre, a leading existentialist philosopher who knew Guevara personally, encouraged the adulation by describing him as "the most complete human being of our age."

"That he was shot after capture demonstrates the fear that the Bolivian authorities felt even of an imprisoned Che. They were afraid to bring to him to trial: afraid of the echoes his voice would have aroused from the courtroom: afraid to prove that the man they hated was loved by the world outside. This fear will help to perpetuate his legend, and a legend is impervious to bullets."

— Graham Greene, 1960s playwright

In addition, more radical left wing activists responded to Guevara's apparent indifference to rewards and glory, and concurred with Guevara's sanctioning of violence as a necessity to instill socialist ideals. Even in the United States, the government which Guevara so vigorously denounced, students began to emulate his style of dress, donning military fatigues, berets, and growing their hair and beards to show that they too were opponents of U.S. foreign policy. For instance, the Black Panthers began to style themselves "Che-type" while adopting his trademark black beret, while Arab guerrillas began to name combat operations in his honor. Addressing the wide-ranging flexibility of his legacy, Trisha Ziff, director of the 2008 documentary Chevolution, has remarked that "Che Guevara's significance in modern times is less about the man and his specific history, and more about the ideals of creating a better society." In a similar vein, the Chilean writer Ariel Dorfman has suggested Guevara's enduring appeal might be because "to those who will never follow in his footsteps, submerged as they are in a world of cynicism, self-interest and frantic consumption, nothing could be more vicariously gratifying than Che's disdain for material comfort and everyday desires."

Despite the occasional controversy, Guevara's status as a popular icon has continued throughout the world, leading commentators to speak of a global "cult of Che". Well known Bohemian writers extolled him, while West German playwright Peter Weiss has even compared him to "a Christ taken down from the Cross." A photograph of Guevara taken by photographer Alberto Korda has become one of the century's most ubiquitous images, and the portrait, transformed into a monochrome graphic by Irish artist Jim Fitzpatrick, is reproduced endlessly on a vast array of merchandise, such as T-shirts, posters, cigarettes, coffee mugs, and baseball caps. This fact led Argentine business analyst Martin Krauze to postulate that "the admiration for El Che no longer extends to his politics and ideology, it’s a romantic idea of one man going to battle against the windmills, he’s a Quixote."

On the 40th anniversary of Guevara's execution in Bolivia the compilation Che in Verse brought together a diverse collection of 135 poems and songs in tribute to Che Guevara. Celebrated poets such as Pablo Neruda, Allen Ginsberg, Julio Cortázar, Nicolas Guillén, Derek Walcott, Al Purdy, Rafael Alberti, Ko Un, and Yevgeny Yevtushenko devoted the aforementioned works to, as the book states in its introduction, "celebrate the world's icon of rebellion". In September 2007, Guevara was voted "Argentina's greatest historical and political figure."

"Che Guevara - hero of the Cuban Revolution, left-wing icon and the face that has sold more posters than anyone else in history. Remembered as a romantic freedom fighter, an expert in guerrilla warfare, and a thoughtful philosopher who died young for his cause, Guevara has always been the revolutionaries' revolutionary. Stylish, vehemently anti-American and considerably better looking than Lenin, Trotsky and Stalin, he practically invented the image of the bearded, beret-wearing left-wing radical, as adopted by thousands during the 1960s and 70s."

— BBC News,

=== Controversy ===
In North America, Western Europe and many regions outside Latin America, the image has been likened to a global brand, long since shedding its ideological or political connotations. Conversely, the obsession with Guevara has also been dismissed by critics as merely "adolescent revolutionary romanticism."

American, Latin American and European writers, Jon Lee Anderson, Régis Debray, Jorge G. Castañeda and others contributed to demystify the image of Guevara via articles and extensive biographies, which detailed his life and legacy in less idealistic terms; and, in the case of Octavio Paz, was accompanied by a critical indictment of the Marxism espoused by many in the Latin American left. Political writer Paul Berman went further, asserting that the "modern-day cult of Che" obscures the work of dissidents and what he believes is a "tremendous social struggle" currently taking place in Cuba. Author Christopher Hitchens, who was a socialist and a supporter of the Cuban revolution in the 1960s but later changed his views, summarised Guevara's legacy by surmising that "Che's iconic status was assured because he failed. His story was one of defeat and isolation, and that's why it is so seductive. Had he lived, the myth of Che would have long since died." Taking the opposing view, Richard Gott a Guardian journalist in Vallegrande, sent a dispatch on the day of Guevara's death stating the following:

It was difficult to recall that this man had once been one of the great figures of Latin America. It was not just that he was a great guerrilla leader; he had been a friend of Presidents as well as revolutionaries. His voice had been heard and appreciated in inter-American councils as well as in the jungle. He was a doctor, an amateur economist, once Minister of Industries in revolutionary Cuba, and Castro's right-hand man. He may well go down in history as the greatest continental figure since Bolivar. Legends will be created around his name.

British journalist Sean O’Hagan has described Che as "more (John) Lennon than (Vladimir) Lenin." Taking the opposite hypothesis, Mexican commentator and Che Biographer Jorge Castañeda Gutman has proclaimed that: "Che can be found just where he belongs in the niches reserved for cultural icons, for symbols of social uprisings that filter down deep into the soil of society." Castañeda has further stated that "Che still possesses an extraordinary relevance as a symbol of a time when people died heroically for what they believed in", adding that in his view "people don't do that anymore." The saying "Viva la revolucion!" has also become very popular and synonymous with Guevara.

== Conceptions ==
=== Cuba ===
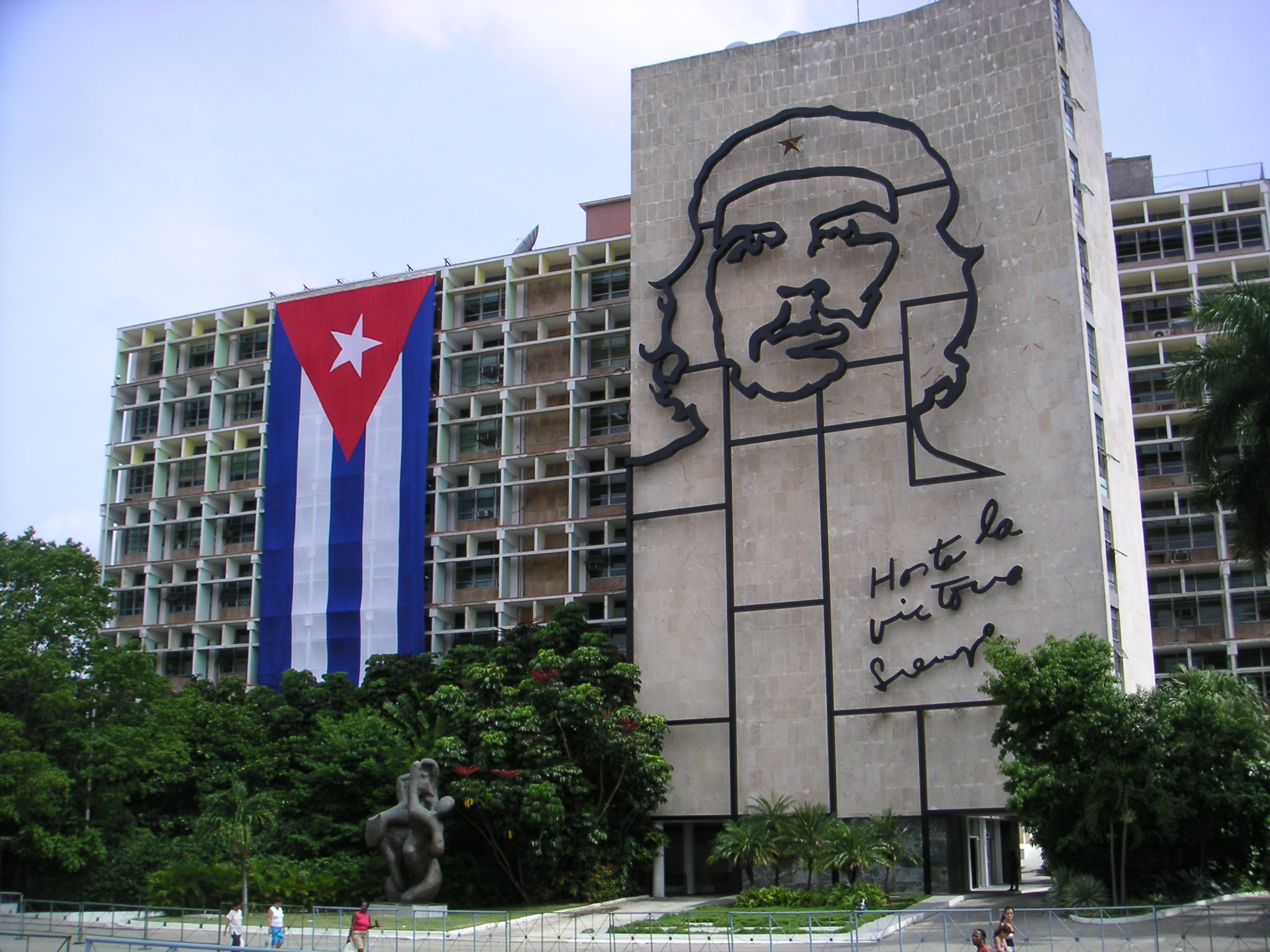
Monumental image on Cuban Ministry of the Interior, by artist Enrique Ávila based on Alberto Korda's March 1960 photo. During Guevara's tenure as head of the Ministry of Industries (MININD) from 1961 to 1965, this building was the MININD's headquarters and his office was on the top floor.

Cuba has promoted Che as a "symbol of revolutionary virtues, sacrifice and internationalism" inside and outside the country since his death. Guevara remains a "beloved national hero" in Cuba (almost a secular saint, to many on the Caribbean island), where he is remembered for promoting unpaid voluntary work by working shirtless on building sites or hauling sacks of sugar. To this day, he appears on a Cuban banknote cutting sugar cane with a machete in the fields.

The Cuban state has continued to cultivate Guevara’s appreciation, constructing numerous statues and artworks in his honor throughout the land; adorning school rooms, workplaces, public buildings, billboards, and money with his image. His visage is also on postage stamps and the 3-peso coin beneath the words "Patria o Muerte" (Homeland or Death). Moreover, children across the country begin each school day with the chant "Pioneers for Communism, We will be like Che!". The University of Havana also possesses an academic concentration in "Che." Guevara's mausoleum in Santa Clara has also become a site of almost religious significance to many Cubans, while the nation’s burgeoning tourist industry has benefited greatly from the ongoing international interest in Guevara's life. For example, some 205,832 people visited the mausoleum during 2004, of whom 127,597 were foreigners. However, Argentine psychoanalyst Pacho O'Donnell regrets the formal rigidity of Che's state-crafted image, opining that "The Cubans have excluded everything about the younger Che that is not heroic, including that which is most deliciously human about him. Personal doubts, the sexual escapades, the moments when he and (Alberto) Granado were drunk, none of that fits with the immortal warrior they want to project."

Despite the formal adulation, Guevara's legacy is less pronounced on a national policy front. In Cuba, Guevara's death precipitated the abandonment of guerrilla warfare as an instrument of foreign policy, ushering in a rapprochement with the Soviet Union, and the reformation of the government along Soviet lines. When Cuban troops returned to Africa in the 1970s, it was as part of a large-scale military expedition, and support for insurrection movements in Latin America and the Caribbean became logistical and organizational rather than overt. Cuba also abandoned Guevara's plans for economic diversification and rapid industrialization which had ultimately proved to be impracticable in view of the country's incorporation into the COMECON system. As early as 1965, the Yugoslav communist journal Borba observed the many half-completed or empty factories in Cuba, a legacy of Guevara's short tenure as Minister of Industries, "standing like sad memories of the conflict between pretension and reality".

=== Cuban exiles ===
Many Cuban exiles have spoken of Guevara in unfavorable terms, and he is remembered by some with the epithet "The Butcher of La Cabaña", a reference to Guevara’s post-revolutionary role as "supreme prosecutor" over the revolutionary tribunals at the fortress. Similar disapproval has been shared by Cuban-American actor and director Andy García, whose 2005 film, The Lost City, portrays what could be perceived by some, including Che, as the brutality of pre and post revolution Cuba. In reference to such polarization, Cuban-American academic Uva de Aragon has hypothesized that "we'll still have to wait many years for history to deliver a definite judgement on Che, when the passions of both sides have passed."

=== Latin American left ===
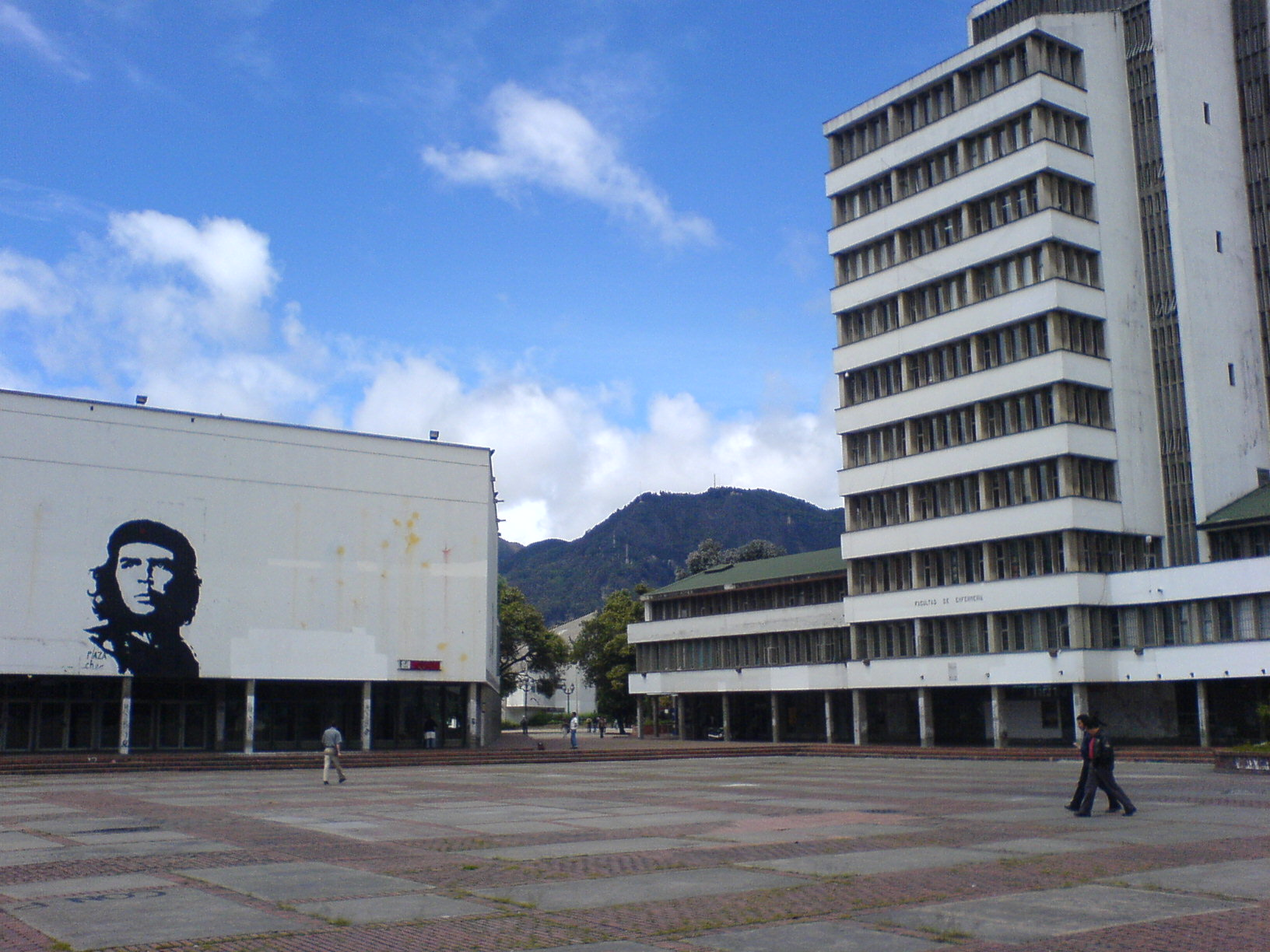
In Bogotá, the National University of Colombia gave their "Santander Square" the nickname "Che Square".

In Latin America, the perceived failures of the liberal reforms of the 1990s intensified ideological antagonism towards the United States, leading to a resurgence in support for many of Guevara’s political beliefs: including Pan-Americanism, support for popular movements in the region, the nationalization of key industries and centralization of government. In nearly every upsurge of revolutionary movements in Latin America over the last forty years, from Argentina to Chile, from Nicaragua to El Salvador, from Guatemala to Mexico and Chiapas, there are traces of "Guevarismo" – sometimes clear, sometimes faint. In the view of the indigenous rights activist Rigoberta Menchú, "In these present times, when for many, ethics and other profound moral values are seen to be so easily bought and sold, the example of Che Guevara takes on an even greater dimension."

In Nicaragua, the Sandinistas, a group with ideological roots in Guevarism were re-elected to government after 16 years. Supporters wore Guevara T-shirts during the 2006 victory celebrations. Bolivian president Evo Morales has paid many tributes to Guevara including visiting his initial burial site in Bolivia to declare "Che Lives", and installing a portrait of the Argentine made from local coca leaves in his presidential suite. In 2006, Venezuelan president Hugo Chávez who has referred to Guevara as an "infinite revolutionary" and who has been known to address audiences in a Che Guevara T-shirt, accompanied Fidel Castro on a tour of Guevara’s boyhood home in Córdoba Argentina, describing the experience as "a real honor." Awaiting crowds of thousands responded with calls of "We feel it! Guevara is right with us!" Guevara’s daughter Aleida also transcribed an extensive interview with Chávez where he outlined his plans for "The New Latin America", releasing the interview in book form. Guevara also remains a key inspirational figure to the Colombian guerrilla movement, the FARC, and the Mexican Zapatistas led by Subcomandante Marcos. In addition, the various "expressions of the popular will" that Che favored over ballot-box democracy – neighborhood courts and the Committees for the Defense of the Revolution – have found new expression in Venezuela and Bolivia.

Amongst the youth of Latin America, Guevara's memoir The Motorcycle Diaries has become a cult favorite with college students and young intellectuals. This has allowed Guevara to emerge as "a romantic and tragic young adventurer, who has as much in common with Jack Kerouac or James Dean as with Fidel Castro." Speaking on this phenomenon, biographer Jon Lee Anderson, has theorized that Che is "a figure who can constantly be examined and re-examined, to the younger, post-cold-war generation of Latin Americans, Che stands up as the perennial Icarus, a self-immolating figure who represents the romantic tragedy of youth. Their Che is not just a potent figure of protest, but the idealistic, questioning kid who exists in every society and every time."

=== Critics ===
The U.S. State Department was advised that his death would come as a relief to non-leftist Latin Americans, who had feared possible insurgencies in their own countries. Subsequent critical analysts have also shed light on aspects of cruelty in Guevara’s methods. Studies addressing problematic characteristics of Guevara's life have cited his unsympathetic treatment of his fellow fighters during various guerrilla campaigns, and his frequent humiliations of those deemed his intellectual inferiors. Though much opposition to Guevara's methods has come from the political right, critical evaluation has also come from groups such as anarchists, Trotskyists, and civil libertarians, who consider Guevara an anti-working-class Stalinist, whose legacy was the creation of a more bureaucratic, authoritarian regime. Detractors have also theorized that in much of Latin America, Che-inspired revolutions had the practical result of reinforcing brutal militarism for many years.
