= San Pablo, Peru =

San Pablo de Loreto
- Town
- Location in Peru
- Coordinates: 4.0415°S 71.0879°W
- Country: Peru
- Region: Loreto
- Province: Mariscal Ramón Castilla Province
- District: San Pablo

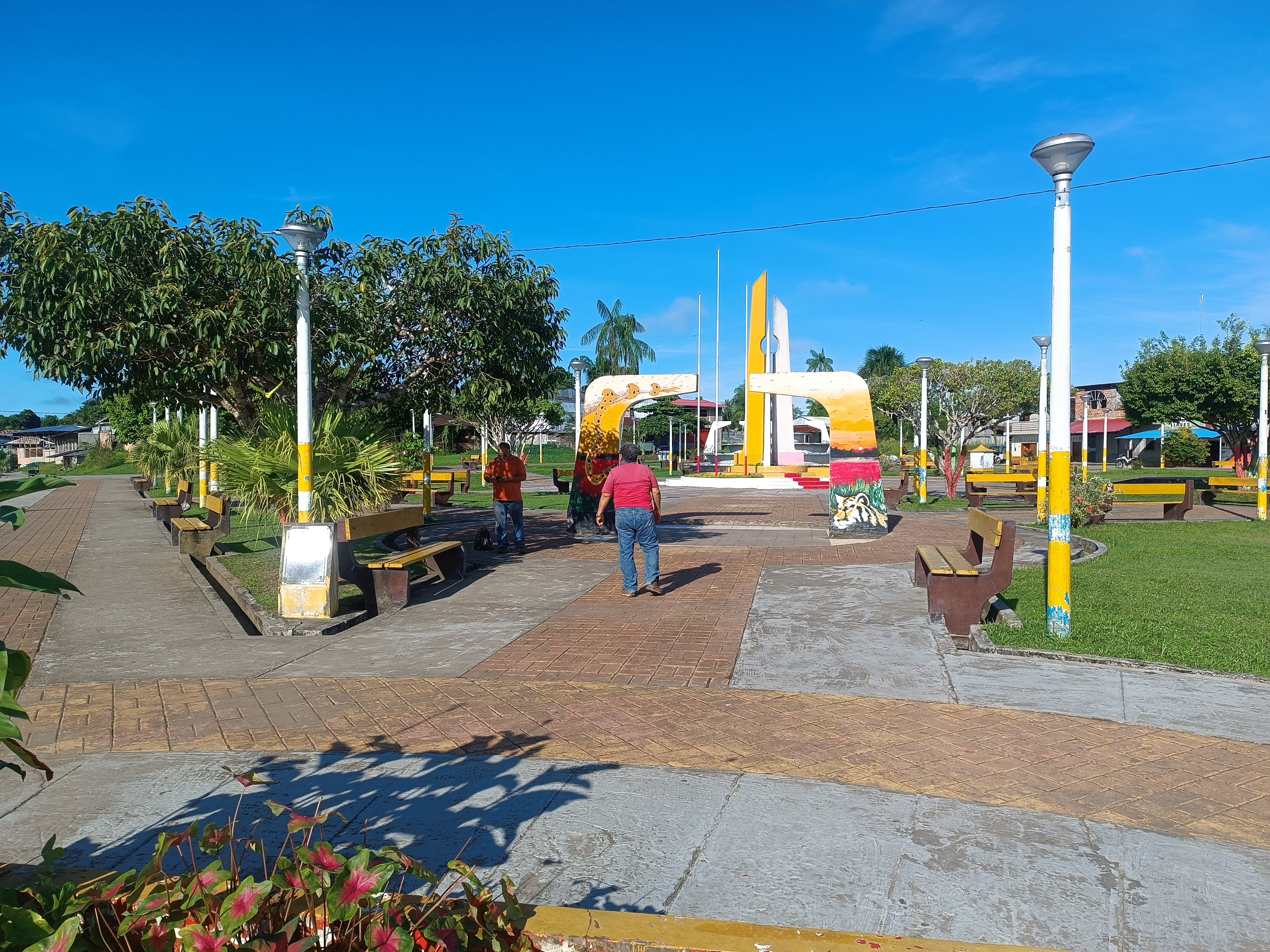
San Pablo de Loreto Square

San Pablo de Loreto is a village, and the location of a leprosarium in Peru. The village is located near Iquitos. The colony was constructed in 1925. In 1941, it became an agricultural colony in which the patients had to work the fields. Maxime Hans Kuczyński helped found the leprosarium in 1936. In 1952, Che Guevara and Alberto Granado worked at the colony. The colony was home to around 600 people at the time. By 1957, the number of patients had increased to about 780. The colony was closed for admission from 1967 onwards, and a 1968 report by Dr Masayoshi Itoh described that 87% of the patients were in need of surgical treatment. The leprosium has since then closed, and the patients have been transferred to Iquitos.

== See also ==
- The Motorcycle Diaries (book) or The Motorcycle Diaries (film)
