= Hugo Pesce =

Peruvian physician and activist (1900–1969)

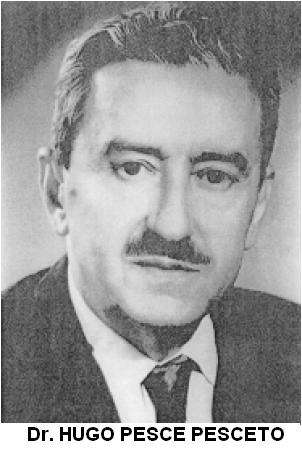
Hugo Pesce

Hugo Pesce Pescetto (17 June 1900 – 26 July 1969) was a Peruvian physician and left-wing activist, intellectual and philosopher.

== Medical work ==
Pesce was born in Tarma, and studied medicine at the University of Genoa in Italy. He first practiced in rural parts of the Peruvian Andes, where he was radicalised by his experiences of the debilitating effects of poverty. He later specialised in treatment of leprosy. He and other Latin Americans disagreed with the recommendations of the 1938 World Leprosy Congress in Cairo, and agreed a different process in Três Corações, which Pesce implemented successfully at Andahuaylas in 1938 and the Apurímac Region in 1940. The 1948 World Leprosy Congress in Havana endorsed the Latin-American strategy; Pesce was later a member of the World Health Organization's expert committee on the disease. In 1945 he joined the faculty of the National University of San Marcos, where he was professor of tropical medicine from 1953 till his retirement in 1967. In 2002, Pesce was among four individuals and two groups named as "Heroes of public health in Peru".

== Political activism ==
Pesce joined the Peruvian Communist Party founded in 1928 by José Carlos Mariátegui. In 1929, Pesce and Julio Portocarrero were unsuccessful in promoting Mariátegui's ideas in Buenos Aires at a convention of Latin American communists. Che Guevara recounts in The Motorcycle Diaries that he first read Marx in 1951 while working in Pesce's leprosarium. In the film adaptation, Pesce was played by Gustavo Bueno. Pesce was also a writer and polemicist, and became Vice-President of the Peruvian Association of Writers and Artists.
