= Che: Rise and Fall =

Che: Rise & Fall
- UK Release, 2006
- Directed by: Eduardo Montes-Bradley
- Written by: Eduardo Montes-Bradley
- Produced by: Soledad Liendo
- Starring: Alberto Granado, Alberto Castellanos, Enrique Oltuski, Argudín Mendoza, Enrique “Pombo” Villegas
- Edited by: Eduardo Montes-Bradley
- Music by: Various
- Distributed by: Alexander Street Press, Kanopy.
- Release date: 2006
- Running time: 60 minutes
- Country: United States
- Language: Spanish with English Subtitles. Dubbed into German.

Che Rise & Fall is a documentary film by Eduardo Montes-Bradley. The film was entirely shot in Cuba at the time Che Guevara's remains were airlifted from Bolivia to Santa Clara, his final resting place. The documentary features the testimonies of Guevara’s comrades-in-arms in Sierra Maestra, Congo and Bolivia, also by Alberto Granado with whom Guevara rode a motorcycle from Argentina on a trip that will end 16 years later in the jungles of Bolivia, an experience that was brought to the big screen on The Motorcycle Diaries. Che Rise & Fall begins with an account of Guevara's death in Bolivia in 1967 and fittingly ends with footage of the return of his remains for interment in Santa Clara's Revolution Square some 30 years later.

According to Lourdes Vázquez of Rutgers University Library, the film documents Guevara's frustrated experience during the period spent fighting in Congo's Revolutionary War as well as his sense of failure. The documentary includes original archival footage, original photographs captured by Ernesto Guevara in Mexico, and images from the ceremony of Guevara’s remains being brought to Santa Clara. Some of these images were originally part of the documentary "Che, a man of this world" (1998) by Marcelo Schapces.

Che: Rise & Fall premiered on National Geographic Channel on June 14, 2007 and has been released on DVD in the U.S., Germany, United Kingdom, Portugal, and Spain.

== Production notes ==
The documentary is structured around the testimony of Guevara’s childhood friend Alberto Granado, and those of Alberto Castellanos, Enrique Oltuski, Argudín Mendoza, Enrique “Pombo” Villegas, all members of his elite military entourage of Che Guevara during his revolutionary incursions in Sierra Maestra, Congo, and Bolivia. Che: Rise and Fall, was shot in La Habana, Bolivia, and undisclosed locations in Africa. What seems to distinguish this documentary from other biographical attempts to capture the man behind the myth is the fact that even though the filmmaker features a wealth of archival stills and film footage, it’s essentially an oral history told by those who knew Ernesto Guevara—filmed on Super 16mm. Aspect Ratio: 1.66:1 DVD | Release date: July 13, 2006. The film was registered with the U.S. Copyright Office in 2006 "U.S. Copyright Public Catalog record:Che: Rise and Fall". U.S. Copyright Office Public Catalog. Library of Congress.

== Festivals and academic projection ==
Che: Rise & Fall has been invited to participate at the 20èmes Rencontres Cinémas d'Amérique Latine de Toulouse, in France. WorldCat also lists the film as available at some fifty university and public libraries in the United States, including the University of Virginia, National Defense University Library, Defense Intelligence Agency, Carnegie Library of Pittsburgh, Bucknell University, University of Pennsylvania Libraries, the College of New Jersey, Morehead State University, Ohio State University Libraries, Emory University, Dartmouth College Library, Université du Québec à Montréal, and Tulane University. Rutgers University Libraries reviewed the film as follows: For the first time, a documentary presents Che’s frustrated experience during the period spent in Congo fighting a Revolutionary War, as well as his sense of failure. This sense of failure was probably the cause of his rushing to organize a guerrilla movement in Bolivia despite being counseled to the contrary.
