= Aleida March =

Widow of Che Guevara (born 1936)

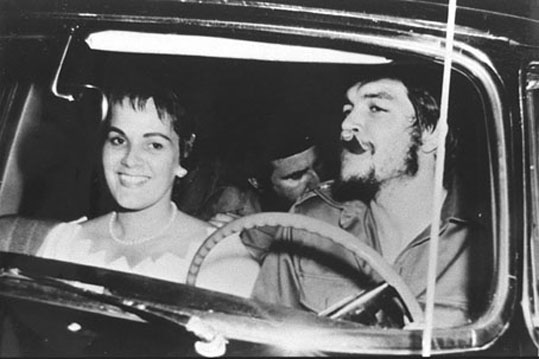
- March with Che Guevara in 1961
- Born: Aleida March Torres; 19 October 1936 (age 89); Santa Clara, Villa Clara, Cuba
- Organization: United Party of the Cuban Socialist Revolution
- Known for: Guevarism
- Spouse: Che Guevara (m. 1959; died 1967)
- Children: 4, including Aleida

Aleida March Torres (born 19 October 1936) is a Cuban revolutionary who is the widow of Ernesto "Che" Guevara and was a member of Fidel Castro's Cuban army.

== Biography ==
Aleida March was an active combatant in Che Guevara's Lightning Campaign in December 1958. She was present at the battle for Las Villas in which Column 8 of the 26th of July Movement was ordered by Fidel Castro to paralyze the occupying military forces of President Fulgencio Batista in the province.

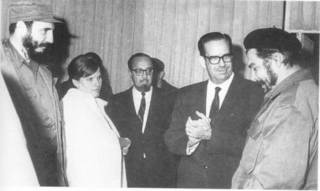
Arriving in the airport in 1965

Her marriage with Che Guevara is reported to have happened both on 23 March 1959 and 2 June 1959, after his divorce from Hilda Gadea. A civil ceremony was held at La Cabaña military fortress. After the 2 June marriage, Guevara and Aleida went to Tarara, a seaside resort town 20 kilometers from Havana for their honeymoon. The couple had four children together: Aleida, Camilo, Celia, and Ernesto.

She is the author of the book Evocation which is about her falling in love with and marrying Che Guevara, and raising their four children after his death.

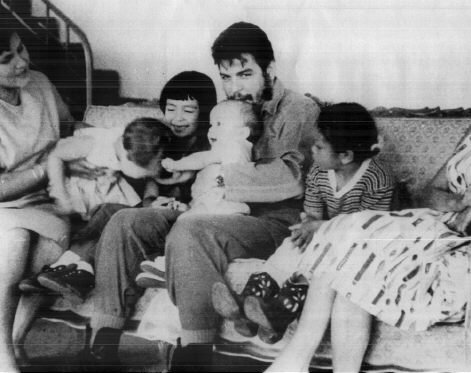
Aleida with Che, stepdaughter and children

She also wrote Remembering Che: My Life with Che Guevara, published in 2012. "We had some most enjoyable times within the maelstrom of the war, and those moments brought us all closer together. They helped us get to know each other as we really were. Some of us were naive, others, very clever; we were all young and full of hope for a future victory. We took every chance to have fun. I remember Che later wrote: 'At the risk of seeming ridiculous, let me say that the true revolutionary is guided by a great feeling of love. It is impossible to think of a genuine revolutionary lacking this quality'."

== In popular culture ==
In the 2008 biopic Che, she was portrayed by Catalina Sandino Moreno, while in the 2005 biopic Che Guevara, she was portrayed by Paula Garcés.

== Sources ==
- Castaneda, Jorge, The Life and Death of Che Guevara: Companero, New York: Vintage Books (1998) ISBN 0-679-75940-9
