= Hilda Gadea =

Peruvian economist, Communist leader, and author

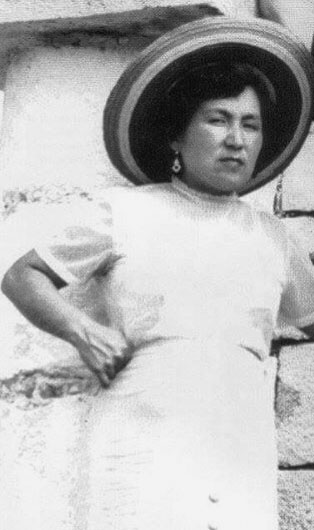
- Gadea in 1955
- Born: Hilda Gadea Acosta; 21 March 1921; Lima, Peru
- Died: 11 February 1974 (aged 52); Havana, Cuba
- Education: National University of San Marcos
- Spouse: Che Guevara (m. 1955; div. 1959)
- Children: 1

Hilda Gadea Acosta (21 March 1921 – 11 February 1974) was a Peruvian economist, and author. She was the first wife of the revolutionary Che Guevara.

Gadea Acosta was Secretary of the Economy of the Executive National Committee for the Alianza Popular Revolucionaria Americana (APRA, American Popular Revolutionary Alliance). Her activities in Peru led to her exile in 1948. She first met Guevara in Guatemala in December 1953. Gadea and Guevara moved to Mexico due to pressure from their politics. She introduced Guevara to several Cuban rebels.

Gadea married Guevara in Mexico in September 1955, after learning she was pregnant. The marriage ended in a divorce in May 1959. They had a daughter named Hilda Beatriz "Hildita" Guevara Gadea in February 1956 who died of cancer in 1995.

Following the Cuban Revolution, in which Guevara fought, Gadea came to Cuba, to be confronted with the announcement by Guevara that he had fallen in love with another woman, Aleida March, and requested a divorce. Gadea remained loyal to Guevara's political movement; she died in Havana in 1974. She wrote the memoir My Life With Che. Gabriel San Roman, a writer for Z Magazine, began writing a play about Gadea.
