= The Motorcycle Diaries (film) =

2004 film by Walter Salles

Motorcycle Diaries
- Theatrical release poster
- Spanish: Diarios de motocicleta
- Directed by: Walter Salles
- Screenplay by: José Rivera
- Based on: The Motorcycle Diaries by Che Guevara Che Guevara: The Making of a Revolutionary by Alberto Granado
- Produced by: Edgard Tenenbaum; Michael Nozik; Karen Tenkhoff; John Kent
- Starring: Gael García Bernal; Rodrigo de la Serna; Mía Maestro
- Cinematography: Eric Gautier
- Edited by: Daniel Rezende
- Music by: Gustavo Santaolalla
- Production companies: FilmFour; BD Cine; Wildwood Enterprises, Inc
- Distributed by: Buena Vista International (Latin America); Focus Features (United States and Canada); Pathé Distribution; FilmFour Distributors (United Kingdom and Ireland); Constantin Film (Germany); Diaphana Films (France)
- Release dates: 15 January 2004 (Sundance); 19 May 2004 (Cannes); 24 September 2004 (United States)
- Running time: 126 minutes
- Countries: Argentina; Brazil; United States; Chile; Peru; United Kingdom; Germany; France
- Languages: Spanish; Quechua
- Box office: $57.7 million

The Motorcycle Diaries (Spanish: Diarios de motocicleta) is a 2004 biographical coming-of-age road film directed by Walter Salles from a screenplay by José Rivera, based on Che Guevara's 1995 memoir of the same name and Alberto Granado's memoir Che Guevara: The Making of a Revolutionary. The film recounts the 1952 expedition, initially by motorcycle, across South America by Guevara and Granado, observing the life of the impoverished indigenous peasantry. Through the trip, both of them witnessed the social classes struggle in Latin America.

It stars Gael García Bernal (who had previously played Che in the 2002 miniseries Fidel) as Guevara, and Rodrigo de la Serna as Granado (Serna himself is second-cousin to Guevara on his maternal side).

The film had its world premiere at the Sundance Film Festival on 15 January 2004, and was later added into the main competition of the 57th Cannes Film Festival, where it won the Prize of the Ecumenical Jury. It was received with positive reviews from critics. At the 77th Academy Awards, Rivera was nominated for the Best Adapted Screenplay category, while Uruguayan singer Jorge Drexler won the Best Original Song category for "Al otro lado del río".

== Plot ==
In 1952, a semester before Ernesto "Fuser" Guevara is due to complete his medical degree, he and his older friend Alberto Granado, a biochemist, leave Buenos Aires to travel across South America. While there is a goal at the end of their journey – they intend to work in a leper colony in Peru – the main purpose is initially fun and adventure. They desire to see as much of Latin America as they can, more than 14,000 kilometres (8,700 mi) in just four and a half months, while Granado's purpose is also to bed as many women as will fall for his pickup lines. Their initial method of transport is Granado's dilapidated Norton 500 motorcycle christened La Poderosa ("The Mighty One").

Their planned route is ambitious, bringing them north across the Andes, along the coast of Chile, through the Atacama Desert and into the Peruvian Amazon in order to reach Venezuela just in time for Granado's 30th birthday on 2 April. However, due to La Poderosa's breakdown, they are forced to travel at a much slower pace, often walking, and do not make it to Caracas until July.

During their expedition, Guevara and Granado encounter the poverty of the indigenous peasants, and the movie assumes a greater seriousness once the men gain a better sense of the disparity between the "haves" (to which they belong) and the obviously exploited "have-nots" (who make up the majority of those they encounter) by travelling on foot. In Chile, for instance, they encounter a penniless and persecuted couple forced onto the road because of their communist beliefs. In a fire-lit scene, Guevara and Granado ashamedly admit to the couple that they are not out looking for work as well. The duo then accompanies the couple to the Chuquicamata copper mine, where Guevara becomes angry at the treatment of the workers.

However, it is a visit to the ancient Incan ruins of Machu Picchu in Peru that solidifies something in Guevara. His musings are then somberly refocused to how an indigenous civilization capable of building such beauty could be destroyed by the creators of the eventually polluted urban decay of nearby Lima.

Later, in Peru, they volunteer for three weeks at the San Pablo leper colony. There, Guevara observes both literally and metaphorically the division of society, as the staff live on the north side of a river, separated from the deprived lepers living across the river to the south. To demonstrate his solidarity, and his medical belief that leprosy is not contagious, Guevara refuses to wear rubber gloves during his visit as the head nun requires, choosing instead to shake bare hands and interact normally with the surprised leper patients.

At the end of the film, after his sojourn at the leper colony, Guevara confirms his nascent egalitarian, revolutionary impulses, while making a birthday toast, which is also his first political speech. In it, he calls for the unification of South America on the basis of the unity of the Mestizo people. These encounters with social injustice transform the way Guevara sees the world and his purposes in it, and by implication motivates his later political activities as a Marxist revolutionary.

Guevara makes his symbolic "final journey" at night when, despite the danger and his asthma, he swims across the river that separates the two societies of the leper colony, to spend the night in a leper shack, instead of in the doctors' cabins. Later, as they bid each other farewell at an airport, Granado reveals that his birthday was not 2 April, but rather 8 August, and that the aforementioned goal was simply a motivator: Guevara replies that he knew all along. The film closes with an appearance by the real 82-year-old Alberto Granado, along with pictures from the actual journey and a brief mention of Che Guevara's eventual 1967 CIA-assisted execution in the Bolivian jungle.

== Cast ==
- Gael García Bernal as Che Guevara
- Rodrigo de la Serna as Alberto Granado
- Mercedes Morán as Celia de la Serna
- Jean Pierre Noher as Ernesto Guevara Lynch
- Facundo Espinosa as Tomás Granado
- Mía Maestro as Chichina
- Lucas Oro as Roberto Guevara
- Marina Glezer as Celita Guevara
- Sofia Bertolotto as Ana María Guevara
- Franco Solazzi as Juan Martín Guevara
- Ricardo Díaz Mourelle as Uncle Jorge
- Sergio Boris as Young Traveler
- Daniel Cargieman as Young Traveler
- Diego Giorzi as Rodolfo
- Brandon Cruz as Miner (Chile)
- Gustavo Bueno as Doctor Hugo Pesce
- Alberto Granado as himself (cameo at the end of the film)
- Matías Strafe as Chichina's friend

== Production ==
=== Development ===
The film shows what we were, which was two young men – boys, really – who went looking for adventure and found the truth and tragedy of our homeland.

— Alberto Granado, 2004

Gael García Bernal agreed to reprise his role as young Che Guevara having previously portrayed him in the television film Fidel. To prepare for the role, he went through six months of intense preparation. This groundwork included reading "every biography" about Guevara, traveling to Cuba to speak with Guevara's family, and consulting with Guevara's then still living travel partner Alberto Granado. Despite being in his eighties, Granado was also taken on as an adviser by Salles, and enthusiastically followed the film crew as they retraced his former journey. Paul Webster, the film's executive producer, stated that "The Che of The Motorcycle Diaries is more akin to Jack Kerouac or Neal Cassady than Marx or Lenin", describing the film as giving the audience "a glimpse of the young, idealistic Ernesto Guevara before he became Che, the legend."

Every generation needs a journey story; every generation needs a story about what it is to be transformed by geography, what it is to be transformed by encounters with cultures and people that are alien from yourself, and you know that age group 15 to 25, that's the perfect generation to get on a motorcycle, to hit the road, to put on your backpack and just go out.

— José Rivera, screenwriter, NPR

Moreover, García Bernal (who is Mexican) adopted an Argentine accent and spent 14 weeks reading the works of José Martí, Karl Marx and Pablo Neruda (Guevara's favorite poet). García Bernal told reporters "I feel a lot of responsibility. I want to do it well because of what Che represents to the world. He is a Romantic. He had a political consciousness that changed Latin America." According to García Bernal, the role crystallized his "own sense of duty" because Guevara "decided to live on the side of the mistreated, to live on the side of the people who have no justice – and no voice." In surmising the similarities between his transformation and Guevara's, García Bernal posits that "my generation is awakening, and we're discovering a world full of incredible injustice."

Granado later stated that he appreciated the film's effort "to dig beneath the "mythical Che", whose defiant image appears on T-shirts and posters around the world, "to reveal the flawed, flesh-and-blood Ernesto beneath."

=== Filming and locations ===
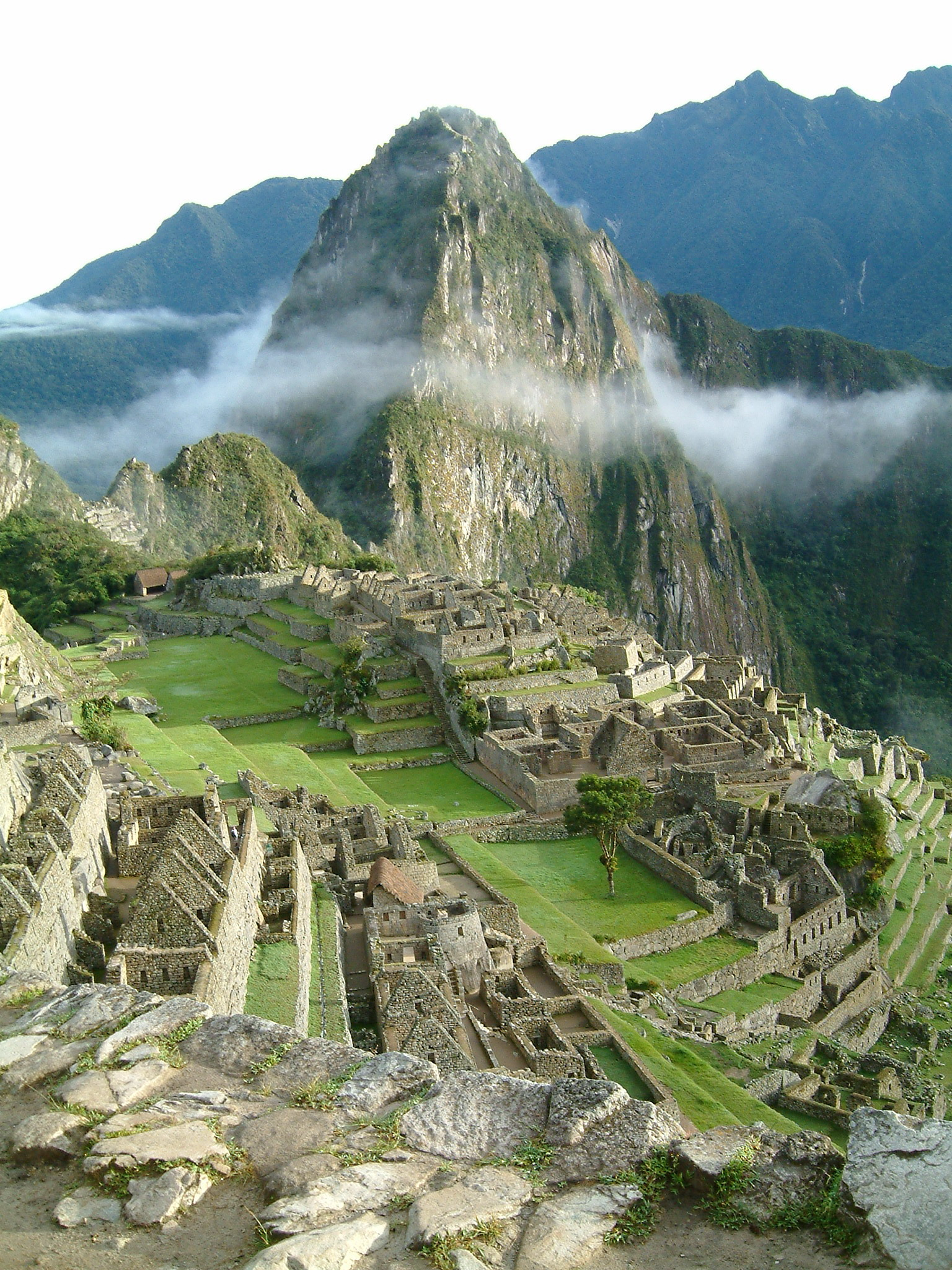
The Daily Telegraph remarked that "the scenes at Machu Picchu are worth watching several times over."

We were re-enacting a journey that was done 50 years ago, and what's surprising is that the social problems of Latin America are the same. Which is heartbreaking in a way, but it also makes you feel how important it is to tell the story."

— Gael García Bernal

In a journey that lasts eight months, the partners travel over 14,000 kilometers (8,700 miles), from Argentina through Chile, Peru, and Colombia to Venezuela. Key locations along the journey described in the film include: in Argentina: Buenos Aires, Miramar, Villa Gesell, San Martín de los Andes, Lago Frías, Patagonia and Nahuel Huapi Lake; in Chile: Temuco, Los Angeles, Valparaíso, the Atacama Desert, and Chuquicamata; in Peru: Cuzco, Machu Picchu, Lima, The San Pablo Leper Colony; as well as Leticia, Colombia and Caracas, Venezuela.

Reviewer Nick Cowen of The Daily Telegraph described the scenery as "visually stunning" while remarking that "the cinematography of fog-cloaked mountains, lush, green forests and sunburnt deserts is breathtakingly beautiful enough to serve as a travel advert for the entire continent."

==== Tourist trails ====
The Observer reported that shortly after the film's release, tour operators in the region received a surge of inquiries, with some of them even offering Che Guevara-themed trips, where travellers could "follow in the footsteps of the revolutionary icon."

The crew filmed in the same San Pablo Leper Colony that Guevara himself had visited. According to Bernal, 85% of the people suffering leprosy in the film were actual lepers, with some of them having lived there when Che and Granado worked at the colony. In fact, when Granado returned with the film crew to the leprosarium of San Pablo, he found some of the people he had treated half a century earlier, remarking that "It was wonderful and amazing that they could still remember me." Granado was also pleased that buildings constructed for the scenes shot at the leprosarium were afterwards used by the patients themselves.

The scene which features Guevara's character swimming across to the other side of the river was filmed during three nights in which Bernal swam across the actual Amazon River.

== Soundtrack ==
The score for The Motorcycle Diaries was composed by Gustavo Santaolalla. The film's soundtrack was released on the Deutsche Grammophon label in 2004.

== Release ==
The film was first presented at the Sundance Film Festival on 15 January 2004. Granado had an invitation to the Sundance premiere, but he was refused an entry Visa by the United States. Later it was featured at the 2004 Cannes Film Festival on 19 May, and Granado was able to attend.

The film later screened at many other film festivals, including: the Auckland International Film Festival, New Zealand; the Copenhagen International Film Festival, Denmark; the Espoo Film Festival, Finland; the Telluride Film Festival, United States; the Toronto International Film Festival, Canada; the Vancouver International Film Festival, Canada; the Celebrating Literature in Cinema Film Festival Frankfurt, Germany; and the Morelia Film Festival, Mexico.

Release dates

- United States: 15 January 2004 (premiere at Sundance Film Festival)
- France: 7 July 2004
- Argentina: 29 July 2004
- United Kingdom: 27 August 2004
- United States: 24 September 2004
- Chile: 21 October 2004
- Peru: 21 October 2004
- Germany: 28 October 2004

== Reception ==
=== Critical response ===
The Motorcycle Diaries may not provide any satisfactory answers as to how a 23-year-old medical student went on to become arguably the most famous revolutionary of the latter half of the 20th Century, but it has an undeniable charm in that it imbues the memories of youth with a sense of altruism and purity – which are complemented by the scenery. It's an incomplete portrait to be sure, but it's a gorgeous depiction of two best friends riding unknowingly into the history books."

— The Daily Telegraph

The Motorcycle Diaries was released to very positive reviews by critics, and received a standing ovation at the 2004 Sundance Film Festival. The New York Times film critic, A.O. Scott, wrote that "in Mr. Salles's hands what might have been a schematic story of political awakening becomes a lyrical exploration of the sensations and perceptions from which a political understanding of the world emerges." Gregory Weinkauf of the Dallas Observer espoused that the film "delivers as both biography and road movie, and proves itself a deceptively humble epic, an illuminating part of the Che legacy." Claudia Puig of USA Today postulated that "the movie achieves an impressive blend of emotional resonance and light entertainment" while describing it as "more coming-of-age story than biopic" and "a transformative adventure well worth watching." Keri Petersen of The Gainesville Sun referred to the film as "a gorgeous, poetic adventure."

Paula Nechak of the Seattle Post-Intelligencer praised director Salles by remarking that he "presents the evolutionary course of a young man who coincidentally became the dorm-room poster boy for an idealistic generation, and captures the lovely, heart-and-eye-opening ode to youthful possibility with affection and compassion." Washington Post critic Desson Thomson lent praise for the film's starring actor by observing that "what Bernal and this well-wrought movie conveys so well is the charisma that would soon become a part of human history, and yes, T-shirts."

Among the film's few detractors was Roger Ebert of the Chicago Sun-Times, who described the film's positive reviews as "a matter of political correctness, I think; it is uncool to be against Che Guevara." Ebert also criticized the film's characterization: "seen simply as a film, The Motorcycle Diaries is attenuated and tedious. We understand that Ernesto and Alberto are friends, but that's about all we find out about them; they develop none of the complexities of other on-the-road couples... Nothing is startling or poetic." Jessica Winter of The Village Voice also criticized the film's simplistic representation of the peasantry, describing "the young men's encounters with conscience-pricking, generically noble locals" who are occasionally assembled "to face the camera in a still life of heroic, art-directed suffering". The film also received criticism for its positive representation of Guevara as a youthful idealist. Anthony Daniels, an outspoken critic of Guevara's, argued that the film helps to continue his wrongful glorification, noting "The film is thus the cinematic equivalent of the Che Guevara T-shirt; it is morally monstrous and emotionally trivial." Frans Weiser agreed, saying that the film's narrative is dominated by reductive images of Guevara as an idealistic, loveable rogue.

Online review aggregator Metacritic gives the film a score of 75 out of 100 based on 37 reviews, indicating "generally favorable reviews". Meanwhile, Rotten Tomatoes records an 83% approval rating based on 157 reviews, with an average rating of 7.5/10. The website's critical consensus reads, "The Motorcycle Diaries is heartfelt and profound in its rendering of the formative experiences that turn Ernesto "Che" Guevara into a famous revolutionary." Furthermore, British historian Alex von Tunzelmann, who reviews films at The Guardian for historical accuracy, graded the film an A− in "History", while giving the film a B in "Entertainment". After comparing scenes from the film to the actual diaries, Tunzelmann posited that "The Motorcycle Diaries gets a lot right, it's an entertaining and accurate portrayal of the formative youth of a revolutionary icon."

=== Awards ===
- Cannes Film Festival: François Chalais Award, Walter Salles; Prize of the Ecumenical Jury, Walter Salles; Technical Grand Prize, Eric Gautier; 2004.
- Donostia-San Sebastián International Film Festival: Audience Award Walter Salles; 2004.
- Academy Awards: Oscar; Best Achievement in Music Written for Motion Pictures, Original Song; Jorge Drexler; for the song "Al otro lado del río"; 2005.
- Argentine Film Critics Association Awards: Best Actor, Rodrigo de la Serna; Best Music, Gustavo Santaolalla; Best Adapted Screenplay, Jose Rivera; 2005.
- British Academy of Film and Television Arts: Best Film Not in the English Language, Michael Nozik, Edgard Tenenbaum, Karen Tenkhoff, Walter Salles; Anthony Asquith Award for Film Music, Gustavo Santaolalla; 2005.
- Goya Awards: Goya; Best Adapted Screenplay, José Rivera; 2005.
- Imagen Awards: Best Picture; Best Director, Walter Salles; Best Supporting Actor, Rodrigo de la Serna; 2005.
- Independent Spirit Awards: Independent Spirit Award; Best Cinematography, Eric Gautier; Best Debut Performance, Rodrigo de la Serna; 2005.

==== Oscars controversy ====
The Academy of Motion Picture Arts and Sciences has very specific eligibility rules for (what was known at the time as) the Best Foreign Language Film Award. This film, being a co-production between many countries, was ruled ineligible because "it didn't have sufficient elements from any of the countries to qualify".

Focus Features co-president David Linde responded to the ruling by saying "It's a truly indigenous movie, but in this case that doesn't mean one country, it means the world. The success of the film overseas affirms how audiences are loving it. We are moving ahead as planned when we bought it at Sundance." The film was campaigned for all the other categories it was eligible for, which was the majority of them.
