= Alberto Granado =

Companion of Che Guevara during his 1952 motorcycle tour in Latin America

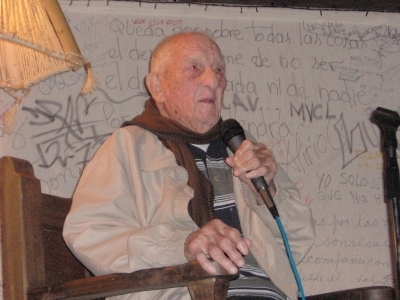
- 2007 photo in Mérida, Venezuela
- Born: August 8, 1922; Hernando, Argentina
- Died: March 5, 2011 (aged 88); Havana, Cuba
- Occupations: Pharmacist-chemist and author
- Known for: Traveling companion and close friend of Che Guevara

Alberto Granado Jiménez (Latin American Spanish: [alˈβeɾto ɣɾaˈnaðo xiˈmenes]; August 8, 1922 – March 5, 2011) was an Argentine–Cuban biochemist, author, and scientist. A youthful friend and traveling companion of Che Guevara during their 1952 motorcycle tour in Latin America, Granado later founded the University of Santiago de Cuba School of Medicine. He authored the memoir Traveling with Che Guevara: The Making of a Revolutionary, which served as a reference for the 2004 film The Motorcycle Diaries, in which he was played by Rodrigo de la Serna. An elderly Alberto Granado makes a short appearance at the end of the film.

== Early years ==
Granado was born on August 8, 1922, in Hernando, Córdoba to Dionisio T. Granado (a Spanish clerical employee of an Argentine railway company) and Adelina Jiménez Romero. In 1930, after José Félix Uriburu toppled the progressive government of Hipólito Yrigoyen, Granado's family relocated to Villa Constitución, province of Santa Fé, due to his father's position as a militant trade unionist. In 1931, Granado was sent to live with his grandparents in Córdoba and in 1940, he attended the University of Córdoba, where he studied chemistry, pharmacy and biochemistry.

In his best-selling biography entitled Che Guevara: A Revolutionary Life, Jon Lee Anderson describes Granado at this time as "barely five feet tall and had a huge beaked nose, but he sported a barrel chest and a footballer's sturdy bowed legs; he also possessed a good sense of humor and a taste for wine, girls, literature and rugby."

In 1943, Granado took part in the political protests against General Juan Perón and was jailed for one year. During this time he came across Ernesto Guevara (who was not yet nicknamed "Che", but "Fuser") after Guevara's family moved to Córdoba in the hope that the mountain air would ameliorate Ernesto's asthma. The two first met when Guevara accompanied Granado's brother Tomás (whom he went to school with) on a visit to the police cells to see Granado. Guevara soon joined a rugby team that Granado had organized once released. Although Granado was six years older than Guevara, they shared literary and political interests, combined with a Romantic enthusiasm for foreign travel. The two soon became close friends, sharing "an intellectual curiosity, a mischievous sense of humor and a restive desire to explore their continent." Asked in an interview many years later about his friendship and time on the road with Guevara, Granado reminisced that "we hit it off well, when there was talk about politics, disease and what not, we almost always shared a similar view."

In 1946, having graduated with an MSc in biochemistry, Granado became a medical assistant to the head of the University of Córdoba's Hygiene and Epidemiology department. He had already developed an interest in Hansen's bacillus, and so the following year took a post as director of pharmacology in a leprosarium. As a result, from 1947 to 1951, Granado studied at a clinical laboratory and at the San Francisco del Chañar Leprosarium. During this time, Guevara made a point of visiting Granado at San Francisco de Chañar. Granado then won a scholarship to Instituto Malbrán, in Buenos Aires.

== Travels in South America and Europe ==
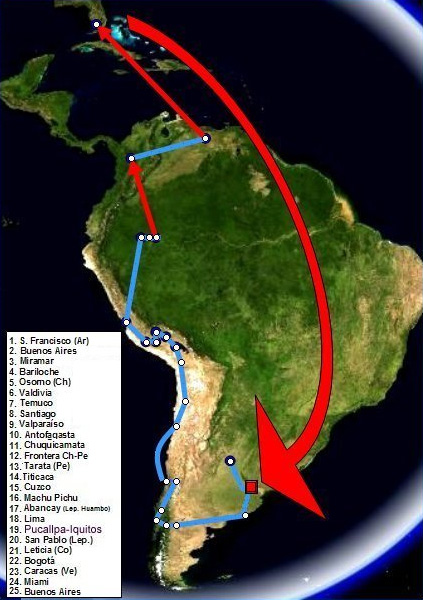
Map of Granado's trip with Che Guevara. The red arrows correspond to trips by airplane.

"I needed to see the world, but first I wanted to see Latin America, my own long-suffering continent. Not through the eyes of a tourist, interested only in landscapes, comforts and fleeting pleasures, but with the eyes and spirit of one of the people."

— Alberto Granado

Alberto Granado (left) with Guevara (right) aboard their "Mambo-Tango" wooden raft on the Amazon River in June 1952. The raft was a gift from the lepers whom they had treated.

At the age of 29 and with full-time work as a biochemist, Granado sought one final thrill before settling into a life of middle-class comfort. So between December 29, 1951, and July 1952, Granado embarked on a tour of South America on his beloved Norton 500cc motorcycle — Poderosa II — with his friend Che Guevara. Both kept diaries on the journey, and would stay at the leprosarium in San Pablo, Peru at trip's end. Throughout their continental excursion, they witnessed first hand the poverty of disenfranchised native peoples and their frequent lack of access to otherwise cheap and basic medical care. In particular, the two men were deeply affected in Chile when they visited the American-owned Anaconda Copper's Chuquicamata copper mine and met workers toiling for pennies and suffering from silicosis. Granado later lamented that although he and Guevara were impressed by the mine's high-tech machinery, "this (was) eclipsed by the indignation aroused when you think that all this wealth only goes to swell the coffers of Yankee capitalism."

Their encounters with South America's "downtrodden and exploited" such as the migrant sheep shearers, copper miners, and indigenous peasantry were a key influence on both their lives. For Granado, it confirmed that there was a wider world to see and help than the middle classes of his hometown, while in Guevara it ignited a burning zeal to tackle the cause of such misery, which he came to see as capitalism. These experiences also galvanized both men in realizing their future vocations — Guevara towards Marxist revolutionary politics and Granado to the pursuit of practical science.

"To think that Ernesto, whom I had known since he was 14, would go on to have such an effect on the world was incredible. Before we left Argentina, we didn't know about Latin America, about the enormous gulf between rich and poor and the terrible exploitation of the people. It had a great effect on us."

— Alberto Granado, The Independent, 2004

Granado's journey ended in Caracas, Venezuela, where he remained to work at the Cabo Blanco leprosarium in Maiquetía. Guevara, however, continued on to Miami before returning home to Buenos Aires to complete his medical degree. The two men did not meet again for eight years, by which time Guevara was a hero of Fidel Castro's 1959 Cuban Revolution and head of the Central Bank of Cuba.

A few years later in 1955, Granado won a scholarship to the Istituto Superiore di Sanità in Rome; while in Europe he visited France, Spain, and Switzerland. He married Delia María Duque Duque upon his return.

== Career in Cuba ==
After the victory of the Cuban Revolution in 1959, Granado was invited to Havana by Guevara, who had risen to become second-in-command under Fidel Castro. Thus, in 1960, Granado visited Cuba for the first time on Guevara's invitation. A year later, he moved there with his family to take up a post as professor of biochemistry at the School of Medicine of the University of Havana. Later that year, he was one of the founders of the Institute for Basic and Pre-Clinical Sciences. In 1962, he founded the Faculty of Medicine at the University of Santiago with a group of colleagues, the second in Cuba. He would serve as a senior professor there until 1974. Granado was thus in part responsible for Cuba's high number of highly trained doctors, which has been described as "one of the undeniable achievements of Castro's government".

Between 1975 and 1986, Granado obtained his doctorate in biological sciences and attended the World Congress on Genetics in Moscow. He also attended the Congress on Polymorphism in Leningrad and became centrally involved in the development of Holstein Tropical cattle breeds. In 1978, he published his account of his and Guevara's 1951–1952 tour of South America, named Con el Che por Sudamerica, in Spanish, Italian, and French.

Between 1986 and 1990, he took part in the creation of the Cuban Genetics Society and was appointed its president.

Between 1991 and 1994, he devoted his time to validation and methodology of his previous research in universities in Venezuela and Spain before his retirement in 1994. In 1997, he joined the campaign for solidarity with Cuba and promotion of Guevara's ideas at home and abroad.

Between 2002 and 2003, he was an on-set advisor to Walter Salles' film The Motorcycle Diaries, based upon Granado's Con el Che por Sudamerica and Guevara's own account The Motorcycle Diaries, published posthumously in 1967. Granado made a cameo appearance as himself in the epilogue of the film. The first English-language edition of Granado's account was published in 2003, entitled Travelling with Che Guevara: The Making of a Revolutionary.

== On Che ==
"What I appreciated most was Che's honesty — and his ability to transform negative things into positive things. ... he was not compromising. It wasn't easy unless you shared his vision and believed in it."

— Alberto Granado

In her film "My Best Friend", producer Clare Lewins asks Granado what he believes to be the reason for Che Guevara's continuing attraction, his response was:

"Because he was a man who fought and died for what he thought was fair, so for young people, he is a man who needs to be followed. And as time goes by and countries are governed by increasingly corrupt people ... Che's persona gets bigger and greater, and he becomes a man to imitate. He is not a God who needs to be praised or anything like that, just a man whose example we can follow, in always giving our best in everything we do."

Before Guevara left Cuba in 1965 to pursue revolutions abroad, he left several books with inscriptions for close friends. Included with these was one book about the sugar industry for his old friend Granado. The message, which two years later after Che's execution in Bolivia would seem prescient, read: "My dreams shall know no bounds, at least until bullets decide otherwise. I'll be expecting you, sedentary gypsy, when the smell of gunpowder subsides. A hug for all of you, Che."

=== Che Trusted Me (book) ===
In February 2010, it was announced that a new Spanish language book entitled El Che Confía En Mí (Che Trusted Me) would be launched by the Abril publishing house. The book, written by Rosa María Fernández Sofía, is based on a series of interviews conducted with Granado. According to the author:

"The story follows the friendship shared between the two friends from when Ernesto was 14 years old and Alberto was in his 20s, outlining all the shared dreams and days, their great adventure through South America and what happened after they went their separate ways following their travels [...] It also contains Granado's reflections on Che's death, the returning of his mortal remains to Cuba and all the difficult stages that the Cuban Revolution and people have lived."

== Death ==
Granado died of natural causes on March 5, 2011, at the age of 88. According to Cuban television, Granado requested that his body be cremated and his ashes spread in Cuba, Argentina and Venezuela.

His death coincidentally occurred on the 51st anniversary of when Che's famous Guerrillero Heroico photograph was taken by Alberto Korda.

== Family ==
With his Venezuela-born wife Delia Maria Duque Duque (married in 1955), he had three children (Alberto, Delita and Roxana). One of his sons, also named Alberto Granado, is head of Cuba's Africa House, a center in Havana that celebrates African culture.

== Filmography and popular culture ==
Granado was featured in the 2006 documentary film Che: Rise & Fall. He is portrayed by Rodrigo de la Serna in the 2004 film The Motorcycle Diaries based on his and Guevara's trip around South America. Granado has a brief cameo following the epilogue of the film.
