= Aleida Guevara =

Cuban doctor; daughter of Che Guevara

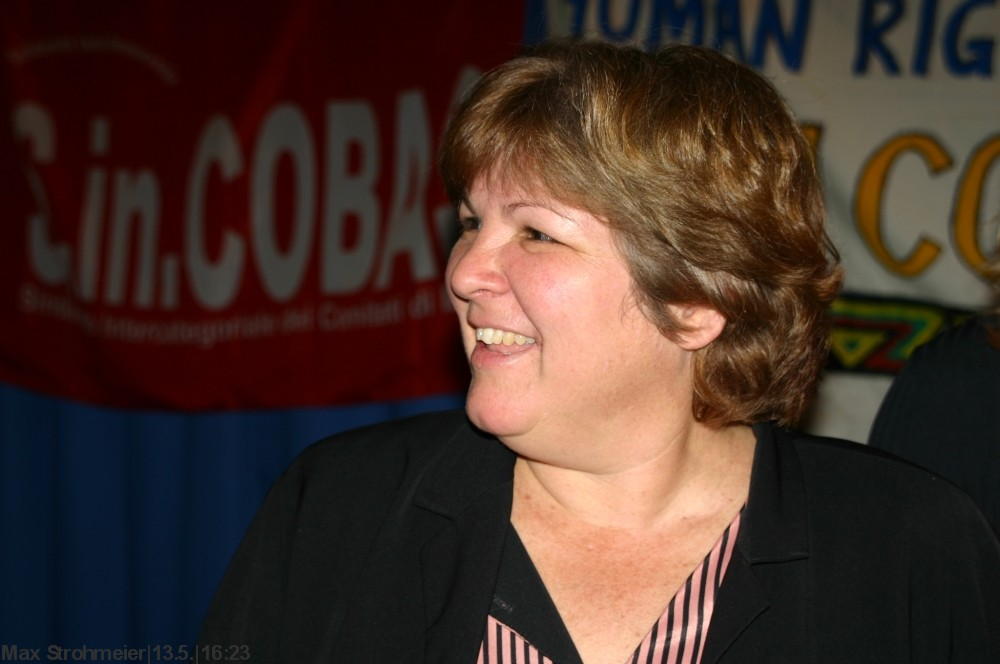
- Guevara in 2006
- Born: Aleida Guevara March; 24 November 1960 (age 65); Havana, Cuba
- Education: University of Havana
- Occupation: Physician
- Children: 2
- Parents: Che Guevara (father); Aleida March (mother)

Aleida Guevara March (born 24 November 1960) is a Cuban physician who is the eldest of four children born to Ernesto "Che" Guevara and his second wife, Aleida March.

She is a doctor based at the William Soler Children's Hospital in Havana. She has also worked as a physician in Angola, Ecuador, and Nicaragua. She is interviewed about the philosophy behind universal health care in Michael Moore's film Sicko.

Guevara has been an advocate for human rights and debt relief for developing nations. She is the author of the book Chávez, Venezuela and the New Latin America.

== Early life ==
Although Aleida was only four and a half when her father left Cuba to foment revolution in the Congo, and almost seven when he was executed in Bolivia, she still has fond memories of him. One such story that she has shared publicly is that her father (Che) would make up animal stories for his faraway children, stating:

My father didn't have the opportunity to enjoy our childhoods. But when he was away, which was most of the time, he would send us stories and drawings on postcards. My brother Camilo was told off at nursery school for using swearwords, and my mother confronted Che because he had a habit of swearing – as all Argentinians do. He was in Africa and he wrote to Camilo telling him that he couldn't swear at school, or Pepe the Caiman [invented by Guevara] would bite off Che's leg. So he had to stop swearing to protect his father.

== Her father's influence ==
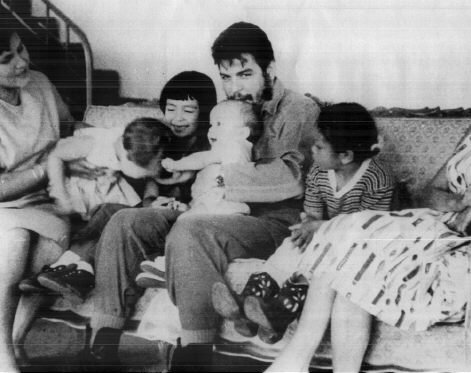
Guevara family 1963

My father's writings are like those of José Martí, the values they encapsulate are everlasting.

— Aleida Guevara

Guevara refers to her father Che as a source of personal inspiration. When giving speeches throughout the world, she often mentions his writings, remarking that she finds his diaries particularly helpful for their "political insights and emotional maturity". She has also stated that she finds herself occasionally exclaiming: "Caramba! If only we'd put in practice this or that suggestion we would be in a better position now." In reference to her father's widespread use as a symbol of rebellion, she has stated that when she sees a child carrying his image on a march and the child says, "I want to be like Che and fight until final victory", she feels elated.

In discussing her father's legacy, Aleida has remarked that:

My father knew how to love, and that was the most beautiful feature of him – his capacity to love. To be a proper revolutionary, you have to be a romantic. His capacity to give himself to the cause of others was at the centre of his beliefs – if we could only follow his example, the world would be a much more beautiful place.

== Angolan medical mission ==
Guevara cites her time as part of a Cuban medical mission in Angola as leaving a lasting mark. She describes the impact of this experience with these words:

"I managed to save many children's lives, but sometimes I just couldn't. The sorrow and regret stay with you forever. The impotence felt at the time motivates me to act against racism, the exploitation of human beings, and the frequent indolence of those who accept things as they are."

== Chavez, Venezuela, and the New Latin America ==
Aleida Guevara interviewed former Venezuelan president Hugo Chávez for the book Chavez, Venezuela, and the New Latin America in February 2004. The book was turned into a documentary and includes excerpts from the interview with Chávez discussing the Bolivarian Revolution, interviews with Cuban humanitarian doctors working for the poor in Venezuela, an interview with General Jorge Carneiro about the April 2002 coup attempt, as well as scenes of life and support for Chávez in Venezuela.

== Current work and personal life ==
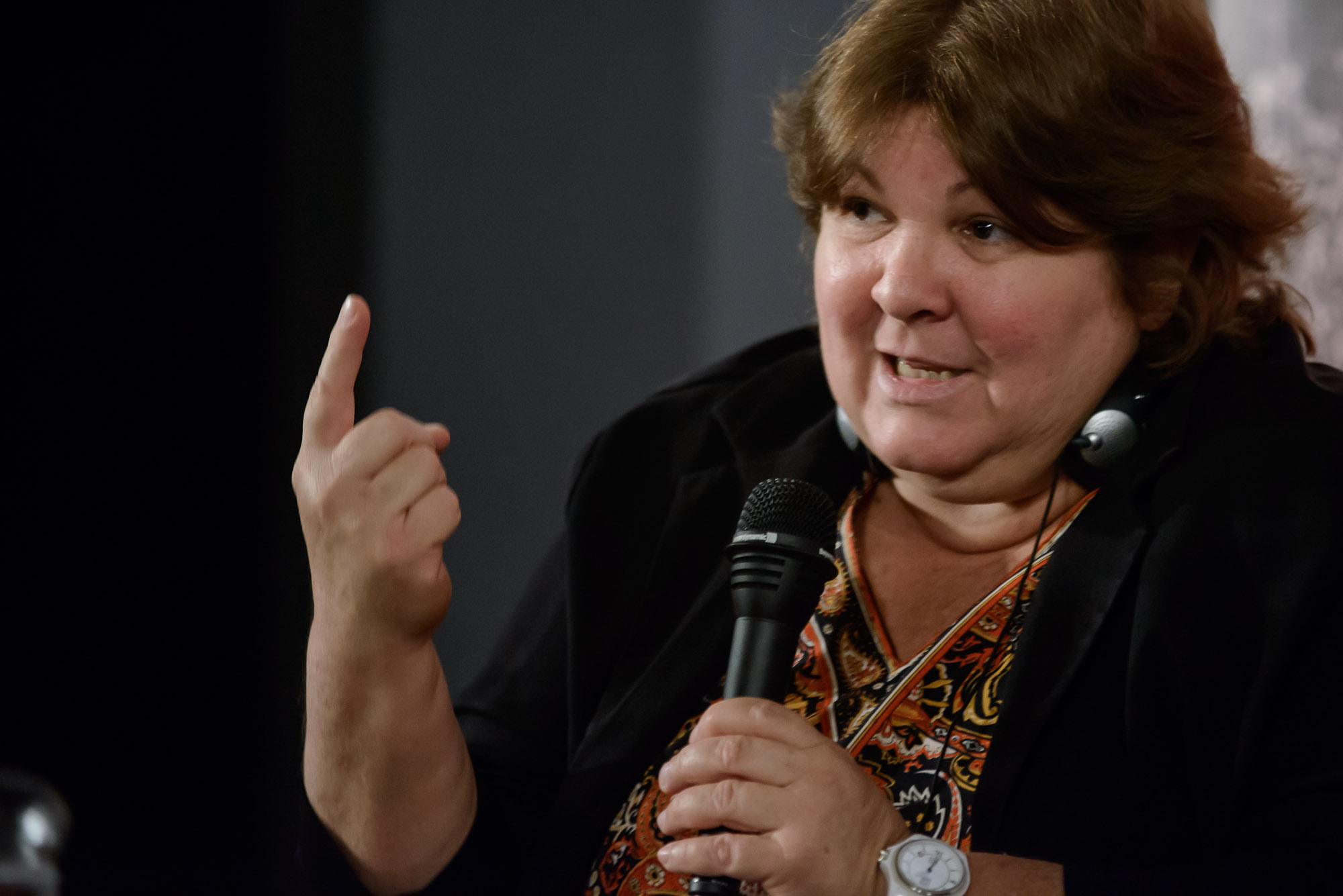
Aleida Guevara on Subversive Festival

As of 2009, Guevara helps run two homes for disabled children in Cuba and two more for refugee children with domestic problems. As a pediatrician specializing in childhood allergies, she has also been involved in medical support for a community in the flooded area around Río Cauto in eastern Cuba, while she has announced plans to work on the Island of Youth, which was devastated by several 2008 hurricanes.

She also participates as a public intellectual and activist in conferences, debates and festivals, such as the Subversive Festival from 4 to 8 May 2013, in Zagreb, Croatia. There she was guest speaker next to other notable public thinkers like Slavoj Žižek and Tariq Ali.

Guevara is said to be taking part in the 2024 freedom flotilla to Gaza, which is due to deliver aid to Palestinians in need, after other aid routes have been repeatedly blocked.

She has two daughters, Estefania and Celia.

== See also ==
- Cuban medical internationalism
- Healthcare in Cuba
