= Tamara Bunke =

Argentine-born East German revolutionary and guerrilla (1937–1967)

- Bunke in the early 1960s wearing the tilted beret of Cuban People's Defense Militia
- Born: Haydée Tamara Bunke Bider; 19 November 1937; Buenos Aires, Argentina
- Died: 31 August 1967 (aged 29); Vallegrande Province, Bolivia
- Cause of death: Killed in action
- Resting place: Che Guevara Mausoleum; Santa Clara, Cuba
- Occupations: Communist revolutionary; Spy; Guerrilla
- Organization: National Liberation Army of Bolivia (ELN)

Haydée Tamara Bunke Bider (19 November 1937 – 31 August 1967) was an Argentine-born East German communist revolutionary and translator. Inspired by the Cuban Revolution, she emigrated to Cuba and ultimately became a spy for the Cuban Intelligence Directorate, adopting the alias Tania. She was the sole female guerrilla in Che Guevara's Bolivian Campaign, an operation aimed at sparking liberation movements and revolutions across Latin America.

Born to communist parents, Bunke's childhood was split between Argentina and East Germany. She joined the Free German Youth at fourteen and later studied philosophy at university. She was multilingual and a multi-instrumentalist with a special interest in Latin American folk music. While serving as an interpreter for the Socialist Unity Party of Germany, she met Che Guevara during his 1960 visit to Leipzig. In 1961, she moved to Cuba and worked with the Cuban Ministry of Education and the Federation of Cuban Women.

Bunke was recruited and trained to be a spy for Guevara's guerrilla campaign in Bolivia. Using an undercover persona, she infiltrated political circles in Bolivia in 1964 and developed ties with President René Barrientos to gather intelligence. Beginning in late 1966, she shifted her role to help establish the remote guerrilla camp in Ñancahuazú, but her cover was blown in the process, forcing her to join the armed guerrilla campaign. Afterwards, she hurt her leg and developed a fever, so she was moved to the rearguard, where she was responsible for distributing food and monitoring radio communications. On 31 August 1967, Bunke was killed when her group was ambushed by the Bolivian army. Her body was buried secretly in Bolivia, and her grave site remained undiscovered for decades.

After Bunke's death, the United States' Central Intelligence Agency (CIA) tried to discredit her by spreading false narratives that she had a romantic affair with Guevara and was a triple agent. Despite these fabrications, Bunke became "a hero of the revolutionary left around the world". Her remains in Bolivia were discovered in 1998 after an investigation into the location of Guevara's body led to her grave site. Her body was moved to Cuba and interred in the Che Guevara Mausoleum.

== Early life ==
Haydée Tamara Bunke Bider was born on 19 November 1937, in Buenos Aires, Argentina. Her mother Nadia (Note: Some sources write her name as "Nadja") Bunke (née Bider) was a Jewish communist from Imperial Russia, (Note: In a letter to Ulises Estrada, Nadia called herself a "Russian Jew". Her obituary in The Times said she was born in Moscow in Imperial Russia.) and her father Erich Bunke was a German communist. In 1935, before Bunke was born, her parents fled from Germany and resettled in Argentina after they faced persecution from the Nazis. Originally, her parents wanted to flee to the Soviet Union, but, according to her mother, the paperwork was too slow.

Once in Argentina, Bunke's parents secured positions as teachers and joined the Communist Party of Argentina. Her mother Nadia described how both of her children—Bunke and Bunke's brother, Olaf—"grew up in a communist environment". The family kept in touch with acquaintances in Germany who sent letters with updates about the Nazi regime, and Bunke's parents joined an antifascist group of fellow German immigrants living in Argentina. In 1952, after the end of World War II, the family relocated to East Germany (GDR), and they eventually settled in Stalinstadt.

From a young age, Bunke was actively involved in political and cultural organizations in the GDR. At fourteen, Bunke joined the Free German Youth, and, at eighteen, she signed up for the Socialist Unity Party of Germany. As a member of the World Federation of Democratic Youth, she attended the World Festival of Youth and Students in Vienna, Prague, Moscow and Havana. She also studied philosophy at Humboldt University in East Berlin.

Bunke was fluent in English, Spanish, French, and German, and she worked as a German–Spanish interpreter whenever Latin American delegations visited the GDR. She was interested in the ongoing revolutionary struggles in Latin America, including the events of the Cuban Revolution and the war in Sierra Maestra. After the Triumph of the Revolution in 1959, she wanted to go to Cuba and continue to support the Cuban people.

== Cuba ==
In 1960, Fidel Castro dispatched emissaries to other socialist countries to garner international support. Che Guevara was sent to Leipzig, East Germany as part of a Cuban trade delegation, and Bunke was assigned as his interpreter. She also served as an interpreter for the ballerina Alicia Alonso of the Cuban National Ballet. In 1961, she received an invitation from Alonso to travel to Cuba.

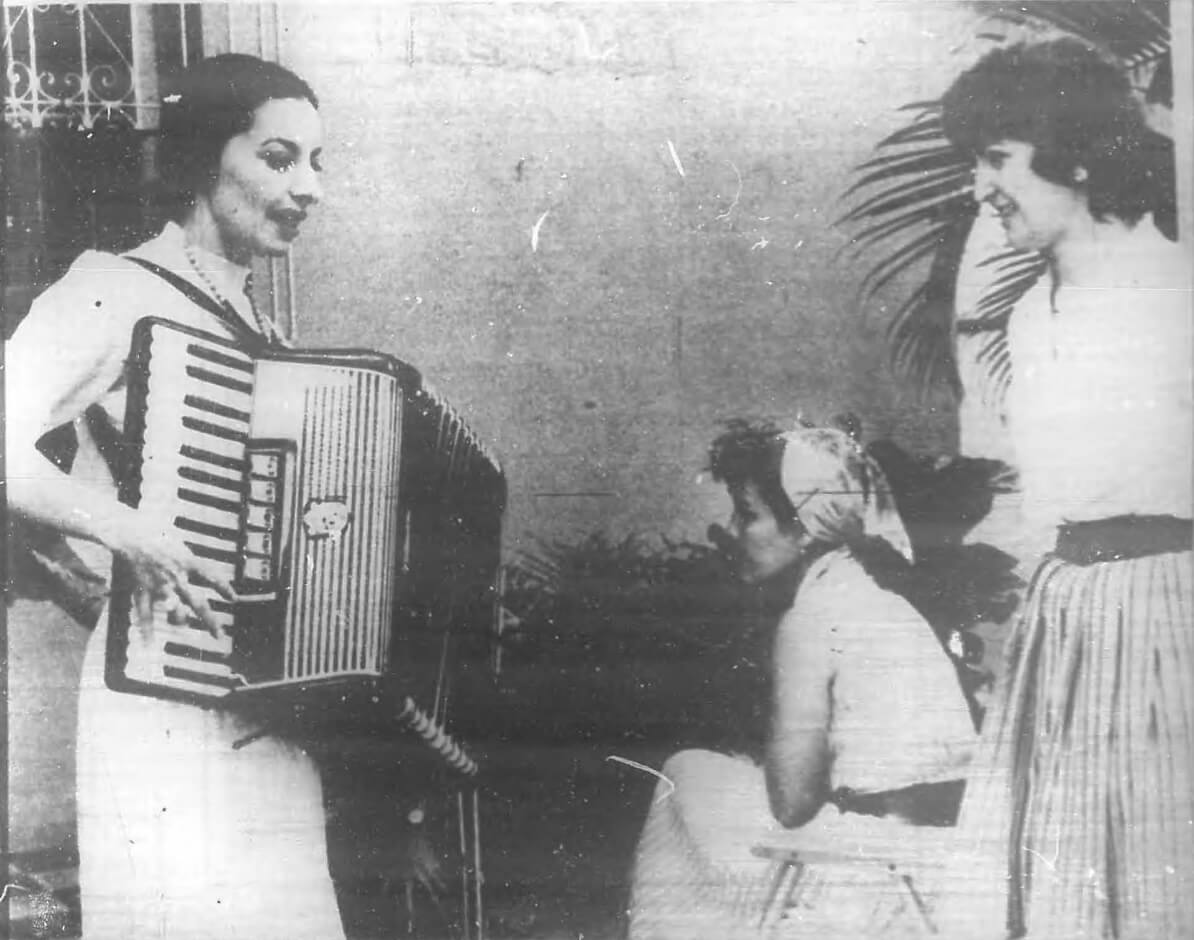
Bunke (right) teaches Alicia Alonso (left) how to play the accordion

According to Bunke, she "became directly involved in revolutionary activities" and "grassroots organizations" shortly after arriving in Cuba. She worked as a German translator with the Cuban Ministry of Education, volunteered to teach in the countryside, and participated in the Cuban literacy campaign. She built homes and schools with Guevara. She helped plan the International Student Union conference in Havana and joined several organizations, including the Cuban Institute for Friendship Among People (ICAP), the Asociación de Jóvenes Rebeldes (later known as the Union of Young Communists), and the Federation of Cuban Women (FMC). Through her involvement in the FMC, she became close with Vilma Espín, a Cuban revolutionary and politician. Bunke also joined the People's Defense Militia and met other Latin American revolutionaries, including Nicaraguan revolutionary Carlos Fonseca, founder of the Sandinista National Liberation Front. She expressed solidarity with the Nicaraguan struggle and shared her desire to join the insurgency in Nicaragua. In addition to her political and volunteer work, Bunke pursued a journalism degree at the University of Havana and performed Latin American folk music on the piano, guitar, and accordion for audiences in Havana.

During this time, the Cuban revolutionary Ulises Estrada (also known as Dámaso José Lescaille Tabares) met with Manuel Piñeiro, Castro, and Guevara to plan a new deep undercover operation in an unidentified country, with the goal of sparking revolutionary uprisings throughout Latin America. Estrada was assigned to train individuals for the operation. He was given a list of three candidates to evaluate, but he said Guevara specifically recommended Bunke as a fit for the role. He and Piñeiro considered Guevara's word to be a "compelling reference", and, after carefully assessing her political and family background, they selected her. Decades later, Estrada would go on to write a biography about Bunke's life, using first-hand knowledge, documents from Cuban security services, autobiographical notes from Bunke, and letters from her mother, Nadia.

== Training ==
Bunke chose "Tania" as her nom de guerre in honor of Zoya Kosmodemyanskaya, a Soviet partisan who used the same alias. In his biography of Bunke, Estrada wrote that he and another "compañero"—or comrade, in Cuban Spanish—helped her develop cover stories, allowing her to walk away from her current volunteer work and enter the world of an undercover agent. Between 1963 and 1964, Estrada helped train Bunke in Havana, showing her techniques she would need in the field, including how to covertly follow and surveil a target, conduct countersurveillance, and use dead drops. She also received technical training in encrypting and transmitting secret messages and practical military training in weaponry and explosives. During this period, Bunke and Estrada developed a romantic relationship.

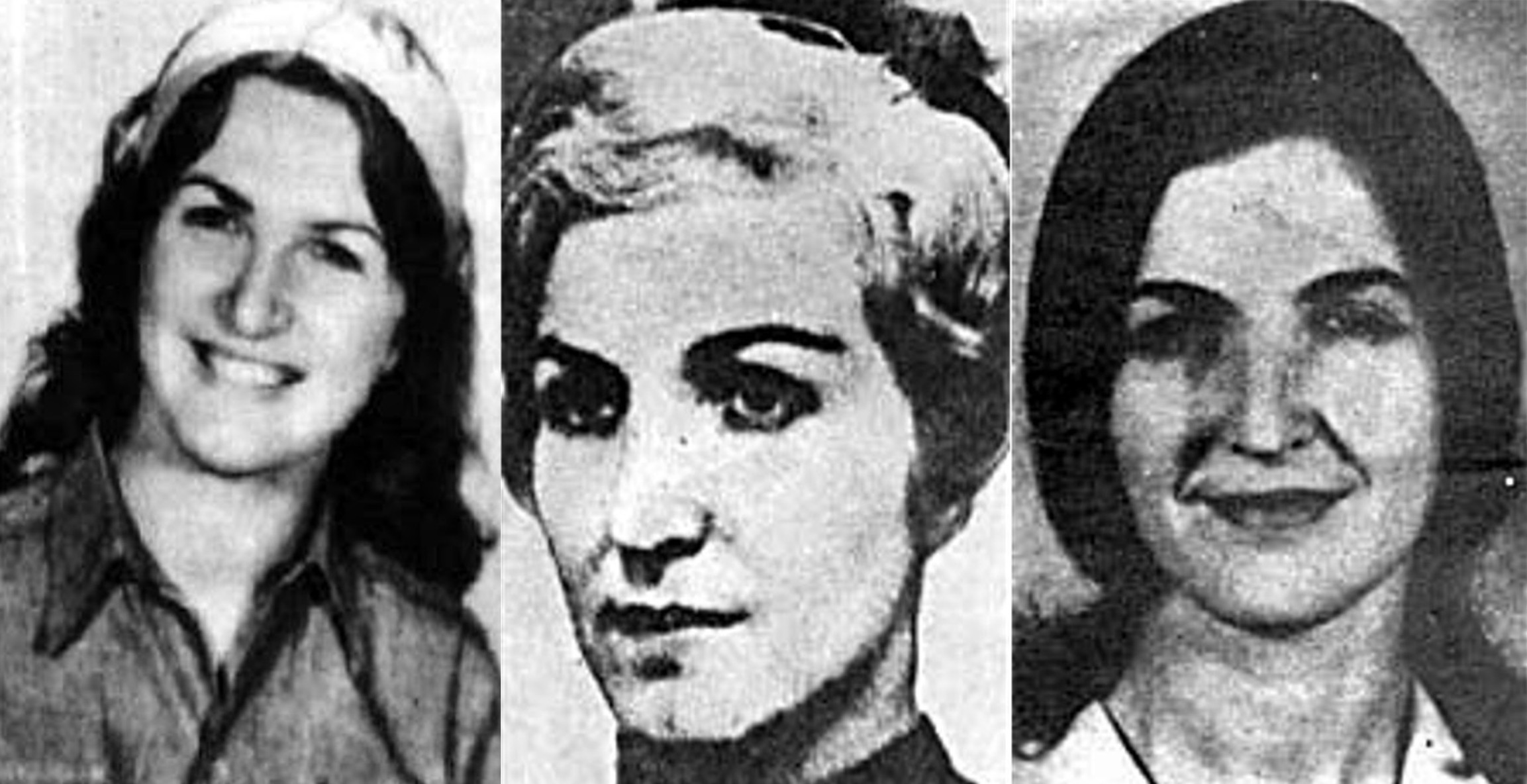
From left to right: Bunke in Cuba, Bunke as Marta Iriarte, and Bunke as Haydée Bidel Gonzalés

On 9 April 1964, Bunke used the cover identity Haydée Bidel Gonzalés to travel to Prague in the Czechoslovak Socialist Republic, where she received instruction from ŠtB, the Czechoslovak State Security, on a farm outside of the city. Estrada wrote that, after Bunke completed this phase of her training, she pretended to be an Argentine woman named Marta Iriarte and traveled through Western Europe to gather information and build another fake identity, Vittoria Pancini. Her Pancini identity was an Italian–German cover that she ultimately used to return to Latin America. Estrada and Bunke later met with Guevara and several other Cuban guerrillas, who revealed that the operation she was preparing for would take place in Bolivia.

== Bolivian insurgency ==
In October 1964, Bunke adopted the fake identity Laura Gutiérrez Bauer and arrived in Bolivia as an undercover agent in what would be Guevara's final revolutionary campaign. Her mission was to infiltrate Bolivia's political and military elite to gather intelligence on the country's power structures. Posing as a right-wing Argentine folklore expert, Bunke quickly gained access to political circles in La Paz. She befriended high-ranking officials, including General Alfredo Ovando, head of the Bolivian army, and ultimately won the admiration of President René Barrientos, even accompanying him on a holiday to Peru.

To solidify her cover, Bunke pursued her interest in Bolivian folk music, joining the country's Department of Folklore in the Ministry of Education and building one of the most comprehensive collections of Bolivian music. She also married a young Bolivian man in a marriage of convenience, securing citizenship and blending further into Bolivian society. Through her connections, Bunke gathered valuable intelligence on the Bolivian military and reported back to Guevara and the Cuban Intelligence Directorate.

In late 1966, Bunke's role shifted from intelligence gathering to preparing for the arrival of Guevara's guerrilla forces in Bolivia. According to the testimony of a guerrilla codenamed "Pombo" (whose real name was Harry Villegas), Bunke welcomed new guerrillas and transported them to a ranch in Ñancahuazú, because there was a shortage of "trustworthy compañeros" in La Paz. Later, the activist Loyola Guzmán said that Bunke had taken on this role in order to help the urban network in La Paz, which was overwhelmed by the tasks Guevara had assigned them. Pombo stated that Guevara was surprised to see Bunke at the camp when he returned in March 1967. According to Pombo, Guevara did not want her involved in direct guerrilla actions, and he criticized her for not continuing her espionage work. Soon after his arrival, Guevara made arrangements for Bunke and several others—the journalists Ciro Bustos and Régis Debray, who Bunke had personally escorted to the Ñancahuazú camp—to leave the camp, because there were reports that the Bolivian army was aware of the guerrillas' presence.

On 23 March 1967, before Bunke could be evacuated from the area, the guerrillas engaged in armed combat with the Bolivian army, killing 7 members of the army and capturing several others. The prisoners were released after being given an "explanation of the [guerrilla] movement's ideals". At this point, Guevara still considered Bunke to be a "visitor" at the camp. Unbeknownst to Guevara at the time, the Bolivian army had interrogated three Bolivian guerrilla deserters and found the location of the guerrilla movement's safe house in Camiri. Bunke had parked her jeep at that safe house before hiking on foot to the Ñancahuazú base, and, since then, she had been unable to return to her vehicle. Inside her jeep, the authorities had found documentation that blew her cover, including the location of her apartment in La Paz. Meanwhile, the United States' Central Intelligence Agency (CIA) was monitoring the Bolivian army's counterguerrilla efforts and exploring ways to provide military aid.

Due to escalating tensions in the area, Guevara decided to abandon the camp and incorporate Bunke and the other visitors into the main guerrilla column, which he led directly. He held a meeting with all of the guerrillas, including Bunke, and officially named their movement the National Liberation Army of Bolivia (ELN). At this point, Guevara may have given Bunke an M1 rifle. However, according to Bolivian historian Gustavo Rodríguez Ostria, she was actually given a pistol, not a rifle—an indication that she was not meant to be involved in any combat.

Between 31 March and mid April, Bunke injured her leg and began to suffer from a fever and a painful chigoe flea infestation. Seeing her deteriorating health, Guevara grouped her in the rearguard with Juan Vitalio Acuña Núñez (nom de guerre: Joaquín) and 15 other guerrillas, 4 of whom were also sick. The other visitors Bunke had originally brought to the camp (Bustos and Debray) left the guerrillas. Joaquín's column split off from Guevara's group and generally stayed near Bella Vista, a small village near the Ñancahuazú river in the Incahuasi mountain range in southeastern Bolivia. Bunke remained with them from 17 April to August. According to Estrada, her duties in Joaquín's group included monitoring radio broadcasts and encrypting messages. She also sewed clothes and was put in charge of distributing food amongst the guerrillas.

=== Death and burial ===
After suffering a series of desertions, deaths, and attacks from the Bolivian army, Joaquín's guerrilla column made a dangerous trek to the Río Grande river in late August 1967 in order to ultimately reunite with Guevara's group. Two undercover military couriers spotted them and quickly informed their commanding officer, Captain Mario Vargas, who was stationed several hours away. The guerrillas stopped at the farm of a peasant named Honorato Rojas and asked him to guide them to a place where they could get water the next day. Rojas had helped the guerrillas in the past. However, since their last meeting, Rojas had been interrogated "under duress" by the army and had agreed "to collaborate with [them] should the guerrillas return". That night, Rojas tried to flee the area with his wife and children, but he was apprehended on the road by Vargas, who had hiked to the area overnight with three dozen soldiers. Vargas forced Rojas to help him ambush the guerrillas. Rojas led the soldiers to a strategic location and then, the next day, he guided Joaquín's group to a ford in the Río Grande called Puerto Mauricio where the soldiers were concealed.

"So I must leave, like flowers that wilt?
Will my name one day be forgotten
And nothing of me remain on the earth?
At least, flowers and song.
How then, must my heart behave?
Is it in vain that we live, that we appear on the earth?"

— "Leave a Memory", a poem by Bunke

At 5:20 pm on 31 August 1967, Joaquín's column was ambushed while crossing the Río Grande at Vado del Yeso. As Bunke and the others walked through the water, the soldiers opened fire. Accounts differ on what happened next; despite the difficulty maneuvering in the high water, Bunke may or may not have been able to turn and fire back before bullets pierced her arm and lung. She was killed and swept away by the river's current.

The Bolivian army recovered Bunke's body downstream on 6 September and transported her by helicopter to Vallegrande. Estrada wrote that the Bolivian dictator Barrientos arrived in Vallegrande two days later and, "in a storm of publicity", was photographed beside Bunke's body. The bodies of the other guerrillas who had been killed in the ambush were thrown into a nearby ravine without any religious rites. Seeing the way the army had treated the bodies of the other guerrillas, the local campesino women banded together and "forced [the army] to give Tania a Christian burial". She may have been buried in a marked grave, unlike her comrades, but even a peasant who witnessed her burial at the time was unable to describe the exact location of her grave later.

Guevara picked up news of her death in a radio transmission from his guerrilla camp in the Bolivian jungle, but he dismissed it as propaganda at first. For several weeks, Guevara and his group of guerrillas continued to evade the Bolivian army, and the CIA assisted in the army's manhunt. Then, in October, he was captured in an ambush and summarily executed by the army. Afterwards, Guevara's body disappeared. When his brother tried to retrieve his remains for burial, a general said that Guevara's body had been "cremated".

Bunke's grave site was undiscovered for decades. Then, in November 1995, Mario Vargas confessed to Guevara's biographer, Jon Lee Anderson, that the Bolivian army had never cremated Guevara, as previously believed. This led to an extensive investigation to find where the army had secretly buried him. After the investigation began, Bunke's mother sent a letter to Fidel Castro in December 1995; in the letter, she anticipated that her daughter's remains would be found in Bolivia and requested that her daughter be buried in Cuba. Castro agreed to honor her request.

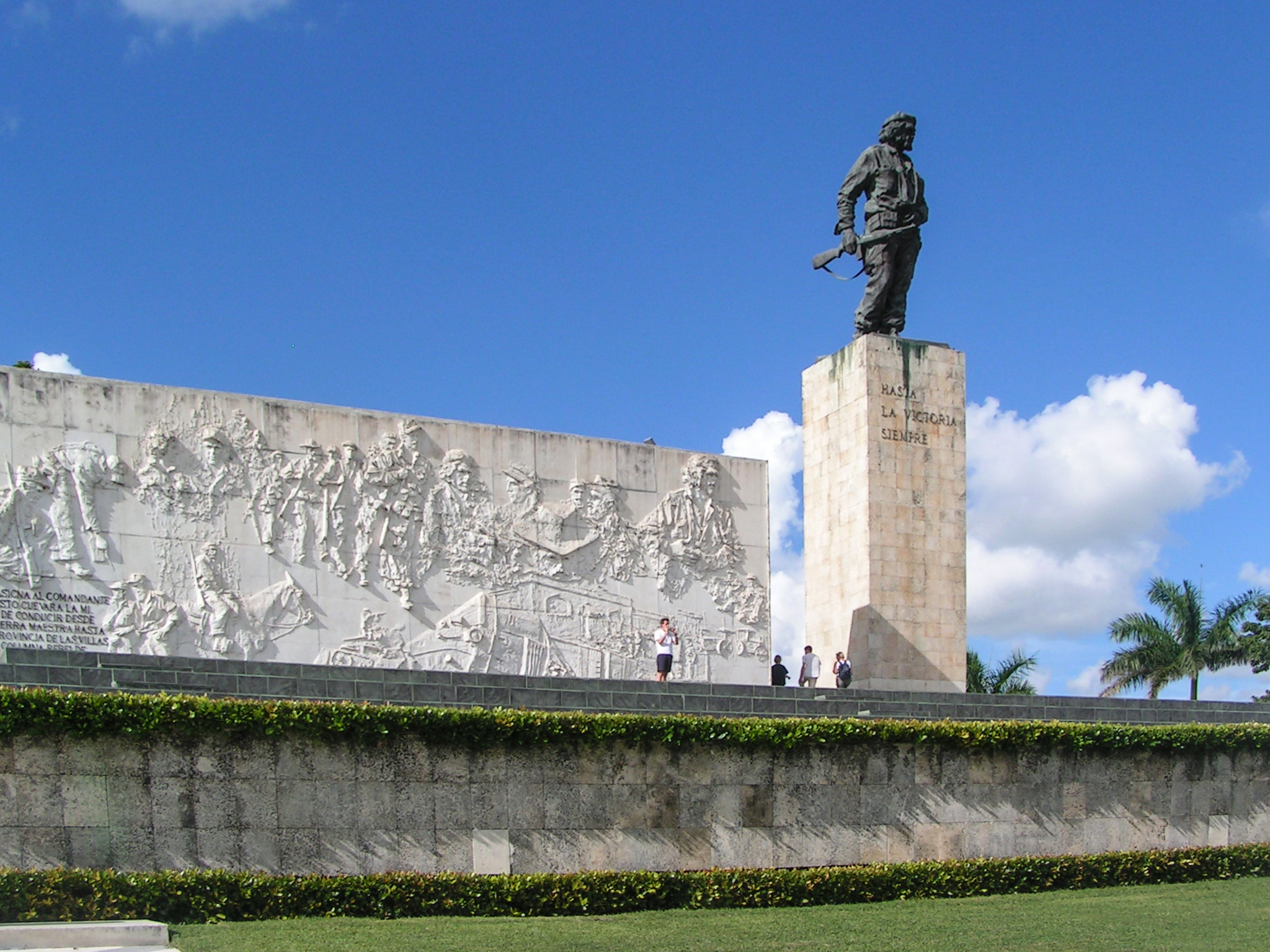
Che Guevara Mausoleum in Santa Clara, Cuba, where Bunke is interred

After the discovery of Guevara's remains in 1997, Bunke's remains were also tracked down on 19 September 1998. She was found in a grave next to a collection of trees on the periphery of the Vallegrande army base. According to Estrada, before her body was transferred, locals in Vallegrande performed a ceremony in her honor, carrying her ossuary to the grave site and singing a Quechuan song called "La Cacharpalla". Afterwards, Bunke's body was transported to Santa Clara, Cuba, where she and nine other guerrillas who were killed during the Bolivian campaign were honored in a military parade, followed by a memorial ceremony led by Raúl Castro, then Vice President of Cuba. They were all interred in the Che Guevara Mausoleum. Bunke was remembered as the sole female guerrilla in Guevara's campaign.

== Legacy ==
Soon after Bunke's death, the United States' CIA invented "sexual scandals" to discredit her, pushing a narrative that she was Guevara's lover and diminishing her contributions to the Bolivian campaign. The CIA also invented a story that Bunke was a triple agent for the Soviet KGB, East German Stasi, and Cuban intelligence. In later interviews, former CIA agents admitted to providing a journalist named Daniel James with materials and background from Guevara's Bolivian Diaries in order to spread these fabrications. James published these claims in The Observer in 1969, and he also included them in a book about Guevara.

When José Friedl Zapata repeated these claims in his book Tania, the Woman Che Guevara Loved (1997), Bunke's mother, Nadia, sued Friedl Zapata's German publisher, arguing that the book was defamatory. Friedl Zapata's book repeated a rumor from Günter Männel—a former Stasi intelligence officer who defected to West Germany in 1961 and later worked with the CIA—that Bunke had an affair with Guevara while training in Prague, though records show they were never there at the same time. Männel also claimed that Bunke was specifically recruited by the Stasi to spy on Guevara, but journalist Christine Toomey writes in The Sunday Times that this claim can be "dismissed", based on her investigative reporting. In an interview with Junge Welt in 1998, Nadia said that GDR security services did not have any documents belonging to her daughter. Nadia also personally traveled to Moscow and obtained a statement from the press office of the Russian Foreign Intelligence Service, affirming that her daughter never worked for the KGB. Ultimately, Nadia's lawsuit was successful, and the courts deemed Friedl Zapata's book defamatory and banned it from being sold in Germany.

Other claims circulated about Bunke that were later discredited: for example, in a biography about Guevara, Jorge Castañeda Gutman published a rumor that Bunke was pregnant when she died. However, this rumor was discredited in 2017 when a doctor named Moisés Abraham Baptista revealed that he had conducted an autopsy on Bunke after her body was retrieved by the Bolivian army. Abraham Baptista affirmed that Bunke was not pregnant. Historian Richard Gott writes that Bunke was also accused of betraying her comrades after her jeep was discovered by the Bolivian authorities in Camiri. However, Gott notes that three guerrilla deserters had already been apprehended beforehand and "the damage had been done ... long before the army found her jeep".

=== In popular culture ===
When Fidel Castro learned of Bunke's death, he praised her as a hero. Journalists John Crewdson and Joseph Treaster wrote in The Globe and Mail that she became "a hero of the revolutionary left around the world". Bunke inspired the Venezuelan singer and revolutionary activist Alí Primera, and he wrote a song in her honor called "Tania". In Cuba, her image was featured on stamps, and she is also the namesake of a maternity hospital in Santiago called Hospital Materno Norte Tamara Bunke. During the GDR's existence, over 200 youth organizations and nursery schools were named after her.

"Tenía los ojos azules
y tocaba el acordeón
y le cantaba en su pecho
amor a revolución."

Translation:

She had blue eyes
and played the accordion
and sang from her heart
about love and revolution.

— "Tania" by Alí Primera

In 1974, Bunke became the namesake of 2283 Bunke, a minor planet discovered by Soviet-Ukrainian astronomer Lyudmila Zhuravleva, and Patty Hearst adopted the alias "Tania" during her involvement with the Symbionese Liberation Army. In 1991, the Swiss filmmaker Heidi Specogna wrote and directed a documentary about Bunke called Tania La Guerrillera. A new species of diving beetle in Bolivia, Desmopachria taniae, was named after Bunke in 1999.

Fictionalized portrayals of Bunke have appeared in thriller novels and film. Agamemnon Films planned a movie focused on her called "Tania", which was set to depict Bunke as a Stasi femme fatale, but her mother threatened legal action in 2002, arguing that the plot was false and defamatory. Bunke's family said they had documentation proving that she was not involved with the Stasi or the KGB and was also not Guevara's lover. Jagged Films and Wildwood Enterprises, Inc production companies have also explored portraying Bunke's life. Franka Potente portrayed Bunke in the Steven Soderbergh film Che (2008), but it was a small role, which Christine Toomey in The Sunday Times speculated was due to legal concerns.
