= Che Guevara Mausoleum =

National site in Santa Clara, Cuba

- Conjunto Escultórico Memorial; Comandante Ernesto Che Guevara
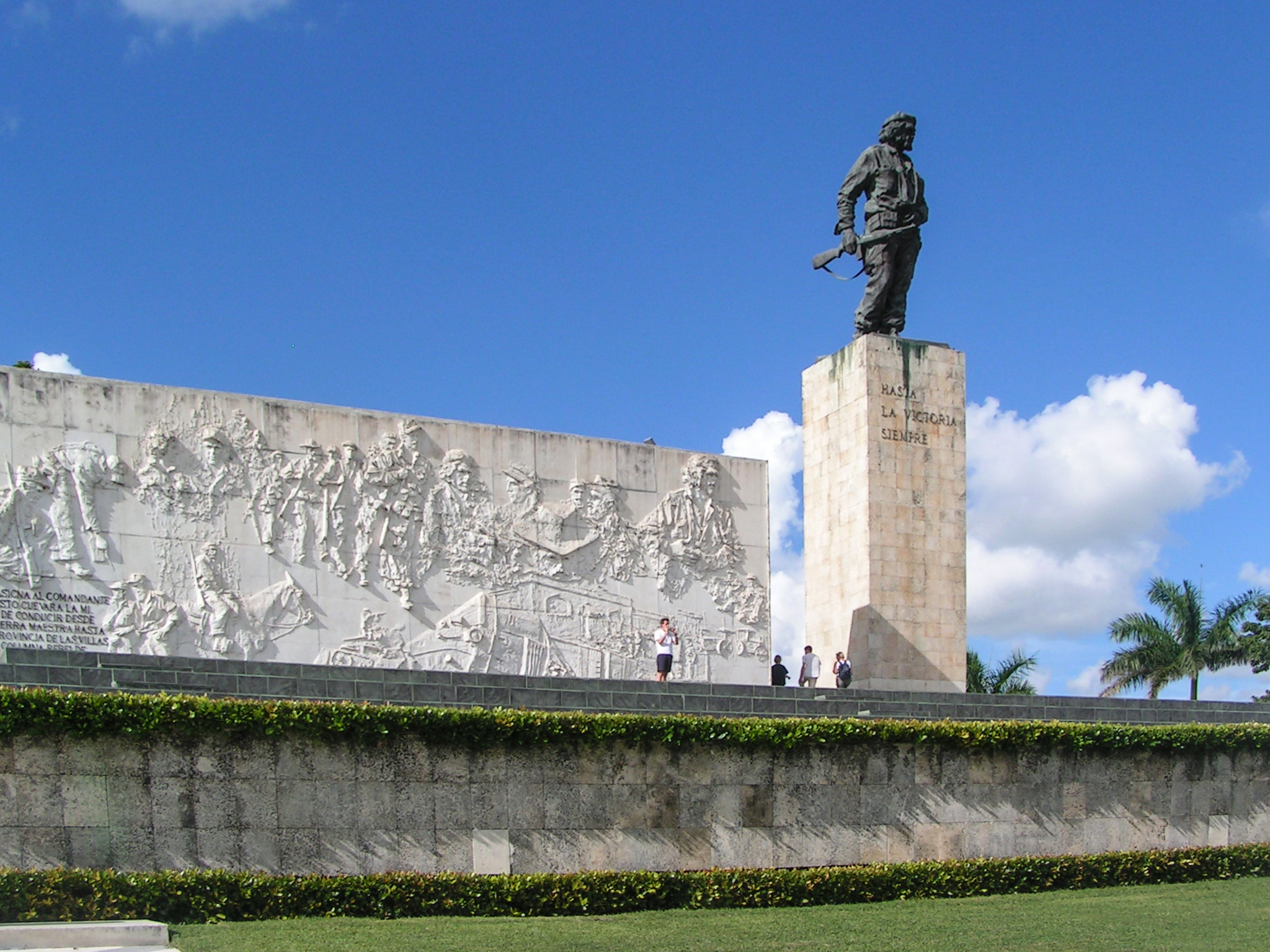
- Che Guevara Monument and Mausoleum
- Location: Santa Clara, Cuba
- Coordinates: 22°24′8″N 79°58′46″W
- Type: National monument, memorial and museum
- Owner: Cuban Government

The Che Guevara Mausoleum (Spanish: Mausoleo del Che Guevara, officially Conjunto Escultórico Memorial Comandante Ernesto Che Guevara) is a memorial in Santa Clara, Cuba, located in "Plaza Che Guevara" (Che Guevara Square). It houses the remains of the revolutionary Ernesto "Che" Guevara and 29 fellow combatants killed in 1967 during Guevara's attempt to spur an armed uprising in Bolivia. The full area, which contains a bronze 22-foot statue of Guevara, is referred to as the Ernesto Guevara Sculptural Complex.

== History ==
=== Historical overview ===
Guevara was buried with full military honors on 17 October 1997 after his remains were discovered in Bolivia, exhumed and returned to Cuba. At the site, there is an eternal flame lit by Fidel Castro in his memory. The site also contains a museum dedicated to Guevara's life and displays artifacts from his childhood, such as his asthma inhaler and books he read in school.

Santa Clara was chosen as the location in remembrance of Guevara's troops taking the city on December 31, 1958, during the Battle of Santa Clara. The result of this final battle of the Cuban Revolution was Cuban dictator Fulgencio Batista fleeing into exile.

Nearby, in another part of the city, a Fulgencio Batista military supply train derailed by Guevara during the battle also remains in its original location.

=== Return of remains ===
In October 1997, Guevara's remains, and those of six revolutionaries who died with him in Bolivia, arrived in a motorcade from Havana in small wooden caskets aboard trailers towed by green jeeps. As the remains were unloaded before a crowd of several hundred thousand people, a choir of schoolchildren sang Carlos Puebla's elegy to Guevara, "Hasta Siempre" (Until Forever) and then Fidel Castro declared the following:

Why did they think that by killing him, he would cease to exist as a fighter? Today he is in every place, wherever there is a just cause to defend. His unerasable mark is now in history and his luminous gaze of a prophet has become a symbol for all the poor of this world.

His speech was followed by a coordinated 21-gun salute in both Santa Clara and Havana, while air raid sirens were set off across the length of the island.

In addition to those of Che Guevara the remains of six other guerrillas who lost their lives in the 1966–1967 Bolivian Insurgency were also entombed in the mausoleum on October 17, 1997:

- Carlos Coello (Tuma) – Cuban, killed in action at Rio Piraí on June 26, 1967.
- Alberto Fernandez Montes de Oca (Pacho) – Cuban, killed in action at Quebrada del Yuro on October 8, 1967.
- Orlando Pantoja Tamayo (Olo) – Cuban, killed in action at Quebrada del Yuro on October 8, 1967.
- René Martínez Tamayo (Arturo) – Cuban, killed in action at Quebrada del Yuro on October 8, 1967.
- Juan Pablo Navarro-Lévano Chang (El Chino) – Peruvian, captured and executed in La Higuera on October 9, 1967.
- Simeon Cuba Sarabia (Willy) – Bolivian, captured and executed in La Higuera on October 9, 1967.

== Monument ==
A visit to his memorial, just outside the town of Villa Clara, is a fascinating study in both history and passion. Regardless of your political views or your opinion of the man himself, a tour of Che’s possessions and the photographic chronicle of his life will offer a rare glimpse into one of the world’s longest-standing love affairs between a leader and his people.

— Liz Fleming, Northern Life reporter

Work on the complex began in 1982, and it was inaugurated upon completion on December 28, 1988 with Raúl Castro in attendance. The project was conceived by architects Jorge Cao Campos, Blanca Hernández and José Ramón Linares; along with sculptors and José de Lázaro Bencomo and José Delarra (its prime creator). Additionally 500,000 Santa Clara residents contributed more than 400,000 hours of volunteer work in the construction of the sculptural complex, who worked in unison with skilled artisans of the Eliseo Díaz Machado Foundry in Guanabacoa.

Many different aspects of Guevara's life are represented throughout the complex. For example, his time in Guatemala and at the United Nations is sculpted, while his farewell letter to Fidel is inscribed in full. The adjacent decorative wall depicts him in the Sierra Maestra consulting with Fidel, beside Camilo Cienfuegos, and in the mountains on horseback. Another section shows Guevara as Minister of Industry performing his usual voluntary work. Lastly literacy tutors, children in schools, and young pioneers are depicted issuing the daily salute that all Cuban children recite each morning "We will be like Che."

The structural complex rests on a rolling hilltop overlooking the city of Santa Clara, and contains a large tiled plaza. At the end of the plaza are two large billboards with quotes by Fidel Castro declaring "Che - it was a star that put you here and made you of this people", and "We want everyone to be like Che." Carved in stone underneath the statue is the well known declaration by Guevara that "One thing I learned in the Guatemala of Arbenz was that if I would be a revolutionary doctor, or just a revolutionary, first there must be a revolution."

=== Symbolism ===
"I used very pure geometrical elements – rectangles and squares – representing Che's persona, very steady, very strong."

— José Delarra, Cuban sculptor and memorial creator

A number of elements of the memorial contain a symbolic meaning. For instance, the monument is oriented 190 degrees pointing Che's figure directly towards South America, reflecting his focus and outlook for one united Latin America. Additionally, the 22 foot bronze statue of Che has him carrying his gun rather than aiming, symbolizing that he is "continuing onward". The sling which Guevara wore during the battle, the result of an earlier broken arm, is also etched into the statue but he is not wearing the sling to symbolize "a part of his personality, a man rebelling even against himself." At the base of the memorial is Guevara's motto, "Hasta la Victoria Siempre" (Until the Eternal Victory).

== Visitor totals ==
From October 1997 to October 2009 over 3 million people visited the memorial site from over 100 countries.

In 2008, more than 247,700 Cubans and foreigners visited the sculptural complex.

== Additional interments at the site ==
Between 1997 and 2000 ongoing efforts by forensic anthropologists operating in southeast Bolivia yielded the recovery of 23 additional sets of remains belonging to other guerrillas who had perished during the Bolivian Insurgency. All of these were subsequently transferred to Cuba where they too were interred in the Che Guevara Mausoleum. The first of these burials took place on December 29, 1998, the 40th anniversary of Guevara's victory in the Battle of Santa Clara, and consisted of 10 separate sets of remains:

- Haydée Tamara Bunke Bider (Tania)- Argentine-East German, killed in action at Vado del Yeso on August 31, 1967.
- Manuel Hernández Osorio (Miguel)- Cuban, killed in action at Quebrada de Batan on September 26, 1967.
- Mario Gutierrez Ardaya (Julio)- Bolivian, killed in action at Quebrada de Batan on September 26, 1967.
- Roberto Peredo Leigue (Coco)- Bolivian, killed in action at Quebrada de Batan on September 26, 1967.
- Aniceto Reinaga Cordillo (Aniceto)- Bolivian, killed in action at Quebrada del Yuro on October 8, 1967.
- Francisco Huanca Flores (Pablito)- Bolivian, killed in action at Los Cajones on October 12, 1967.
- Garvan Edilverto Lucio Hidalgo (Eustace)- Peruvian, killed in action at Los Cajones on October 12, 1967.
- Jaime Arana Campero (Chapaco)- Bolivian, killed in action at Los Cajones on October 12, 1967.
- Octavio de la Concepcion Pedraja (Moro)- Cuban, killed in action at Los Cajones on October 12, 1967.
- Julio César Méndez Korné (Nato)- Bolivian, shot by fellow guerrillas after being gravely wounded in Mataral on November 15, 1967.

A second series of burials was carried out on October 8, 1999 in which the remains of 7 more guerillas recovered in Bolivia were placed in the mausoleum:

- Apolinar Aguirre Quispe (Polo)-Bolivian, killed in action at Vado del Yeso on August 31, 1967.
- Freddy Maymura (also Maemura) Hurtado (ja) (Ernesto)- Bolivian, captured and executed at Vado del Yeso on August 31, 1967.
- Gustavo Manchin Hoed de Beche (Alejandro)- Cuban, killed in action at Vado del Yeso on August 31, 1967.
- Israel Reyes Sayas (Braulio)- Cuban, killed in action at Vado del Yeso on August 31, 1967.
- Juan Vitalio Acuña Nuñez (Joaquin)- Cuban, killed in action at Vado del Yeso on August 31, 1967.
- Moises Guevara Rodriguez (Moses)- Bolivian, killed in action at Vado del Yeso on August 31, 1967.
- Walter Arencibia Ayala (Abel)- Bolivian, killed in action at Vado del Yeso on August 31, 1967.

A final round of 6 interments took place exactly one year later on October 8, 2000 bringing the total number of guerrillas entombed at the site to 30:

- Eliseo Reyes Rodriguez (Rolando)- Cuban, killed in action at El Meson on April 25, 1967.
- Antonio Sanchez Diaz (Marcos)- Cuban, killed in action at Peña Colorada on June 2, 1967.
- Serapio Aquino Tudela (Serafin)- Bolivian, killed in action at Iquira on July 9, 1967.
- Condori Casildo Varga (Victor)- Bolivian, killed in action at Rio Rosita on July 30, 1967.
- Jose Maria Martinez Tamayo (Papi)- Cuban, killed in action at Rio Rosita on July 30, 1967.
- Restituto José Cabrera Flores (El Negro)-Peruvian, captured and executed in Rio Palmarito on September 4, 1967.

== See also ==
- Atatürk Mausoleum (Ankara, Turkey)
- Santa Ifigenia Cemetery (Santiago de Cuba, Cuba)
- Mausoleum of Carlos Fonseca (Managua, Nicaragua)
- Lenin's Mausoleum (Moscow, Russia)
- Ho Chi Minh Mausoleum (Vietnam)
- Georgi Dimitrov Mausoleum (Sofia, Bulgaria)
- Sükhbaatar's Mausoleum (Ulaanbaatar, Mongolia)
- National Monument in Vitkov (Prague, Czechoslovakia)
- Mausoleum of Mao Zedong (Beijing, China)
- Kumsusan Palace of the Sun (North Korea)
