= Tabares =

Tabares is a surname. Notable people with the name include:

- Alejo Tabares (born 2001), Argentine football left-back
- Carlos Tabares (born 1974), Cuban baseball player
- Carolina Tabares (born 1986), Colombian long-distance runner
- Dámaso José Lescaille Tabares, Cuban revolutionary
- José Tabares (born 1978), Argentine football striker
- Mario Tabares (born 1965), Cuban tennis player
- Perla Tabares Hantman (1936/1937–2025), Cuban-born member of the Miami-Dade County School Board in Florida, United States
- Querido Moheno Tabares, former Secretary of Foreign Affairs of Mexico
- Silvana Tabares, member of Chicago City Council
