= Route of Che =

Historic route in Bolivia

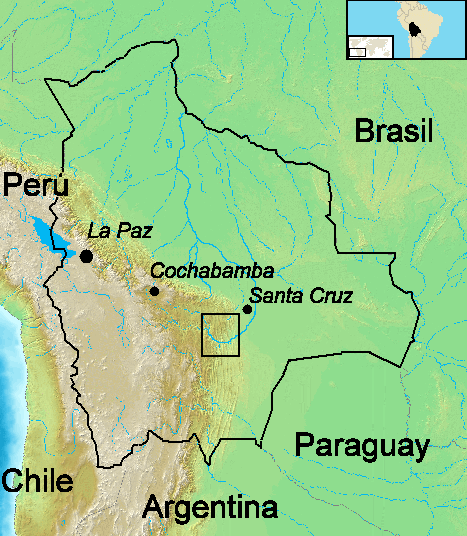
Map of Bolivia. The square indicates the area of Che Guevara's guerrilla actions in 1966–1967.

The Route of Che (la ruta del Che) is the term used to refer to the route followed by the Argentinian revolutionary Che Guevara and his men in the region of Ñancahuazú, Bolivia in 1966 and 1967. This ended with his execution at La Higuera on 9 October 1967, followed by exposure of his body and burial in an unmarked grave in Vallegrande.

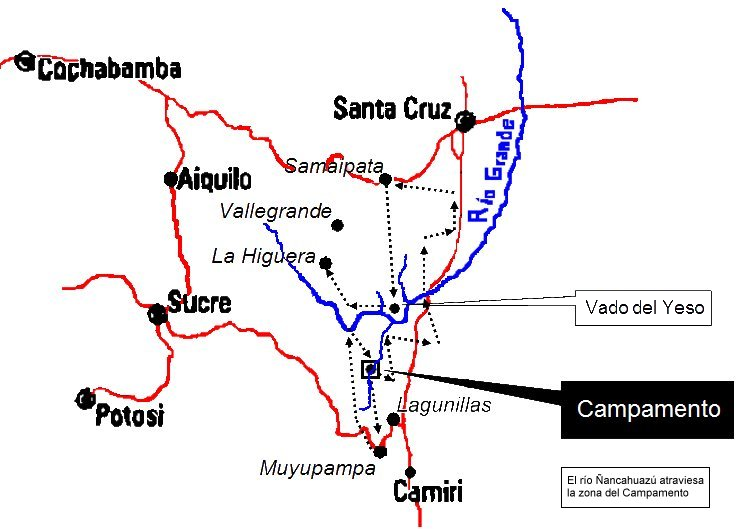
The dotted line indicates the route taken by the guerrilla group led by Guevara to the place where he was shot. Today it is a well frequented circuit, as a historic and touristic memorial: "La ruta del Che".

== Location ==
His actions and those of his guerrilla group in 1966 and 1967 were centred on a farm acquired on the River Ñancahuazú, a seasonal mountain river, flowing directly into the Rio Grande. It is located in the south-east part of Bolivia, where the last foothills of the Andes give way to the Gran Chaco.

It is a sparsely populated region, the home of indigenous peasants of Guaraní origin. The closest places are Samaipata to the north and Camiri to the south. The road starts in Alta Gracia, Argentina, and connects various cities (San Martín de los Andes, Bariloche and from there passes through Chile, where it connects to Osorno and Traiguén on the way to Valparaíso, Santiago and the north, to cross into Bolivia.

== The route ==
The Che route takes 800 km to pass through the major points of action in the guerrilla campaign of Guevara and his group.

=== Camiri ===
Camiri, known as the "oil capital" of Bolivia, is located on the main access route to Bolivia from the south, as much from Paraguay (by the "Trans-Chaco" highway) as from Argentina. It arrives at Santa Cruz de la Sierra to the north. Here one can visit the prison-museum where they were held and tortured, as well as the library where the French intellectual Régis Debray and the Argentinian painter Ciro Bustos were judged, as people connected with the rebel group. Debray confirmed under torture to the Bolivian military authorities that Che Guevara was operating in that area, and Bustos made drawings of the members of the group: the originals of these are now exhibited in the officers' quarters of Camiri barracks. An interesting aside is that Debray married Elisabeth Burgos, a Venezuelan anthropologist, there during a two-hour permission. After international protests Debray was released and returned to France, where he became a prominent philosopher.

The hotel room in which Tamara Bunke ("Tania"), the only woman in the group, was housed is in the same area. She was an Argentine-born East German communist revolutionary and spy who had played a prominent role in the Cuban government after the Cuban Revolution.

=== Lagunillas ===
In Lagunillas there is a hamlet, close to the farm occupied by Guevara and his group, that is now a museum.

=== Ñancahuazú ===
The farm used by the guerrilla group is located on the River Ñancahuazú. Their headquarters was established there, and it was the scene of the first battles and deaths. There was also a screen for the local people and police.

=== Vado de Yeso ===
The river Ñancahuazú flows into the great Río Grande, a few kilometers downstream from the place where the guerrilla camp had been set up. This was the scene of the"Ambush of Vado del Yeso", which resulted in the deaths of all the participants, including Tamara Bunke, apart from a guerrilla second column commanded by "Vilo" Acuña, a Cuban politician.

=== Samaipata ===
Samaipata is a small community at an altitude of 1,600–1,800 meters with a population of 3,000 inhabitants to the north of Ñancahuazú, about 120 kilometers to the southwest of Santa Cruz de la Sierra. It is in the foothills of the Andes, on the road that connects Santa Cruz de la Sierra and Cochabamba, and was used by the guerrillas as a source of food and medical supplies.

=== La Higuera ===
The school in which Che Guevara and some of his men were detained, questioned and murdered is located in the small hamlet of La Higuera, with 30 dwellings at altitude 2,160 meters. A well known monument to Guevara has been built, consisting of a large bust and a cross on a stone, next to the school where he died. The bust was placed in 1978 and the military governments of Bolivia during successive dictatorships tried repeatedly to destroy it; on each occasion it was rebuilt by unnamed people. Only five guerrillas managed to survive, and flee to Chile. These included Harry Villegas, a Cuban communist guerrilla who returned to Cuba and became a writer.

Quebrada del Churo, the scene of the battle in which Guevera was wounded and captured, is not far from La Higuera.

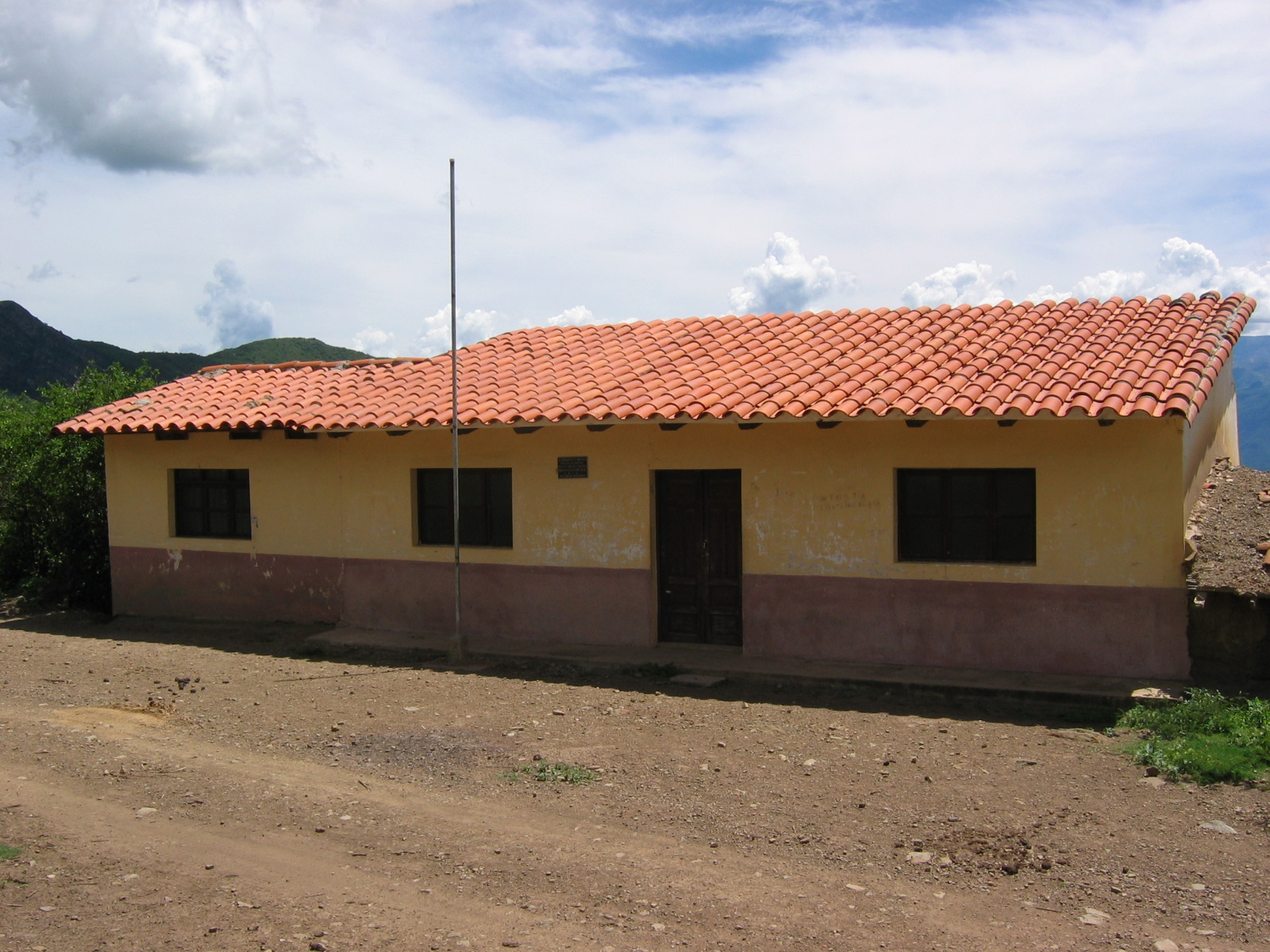
La Higuera: school in which Che Guevara was murdered

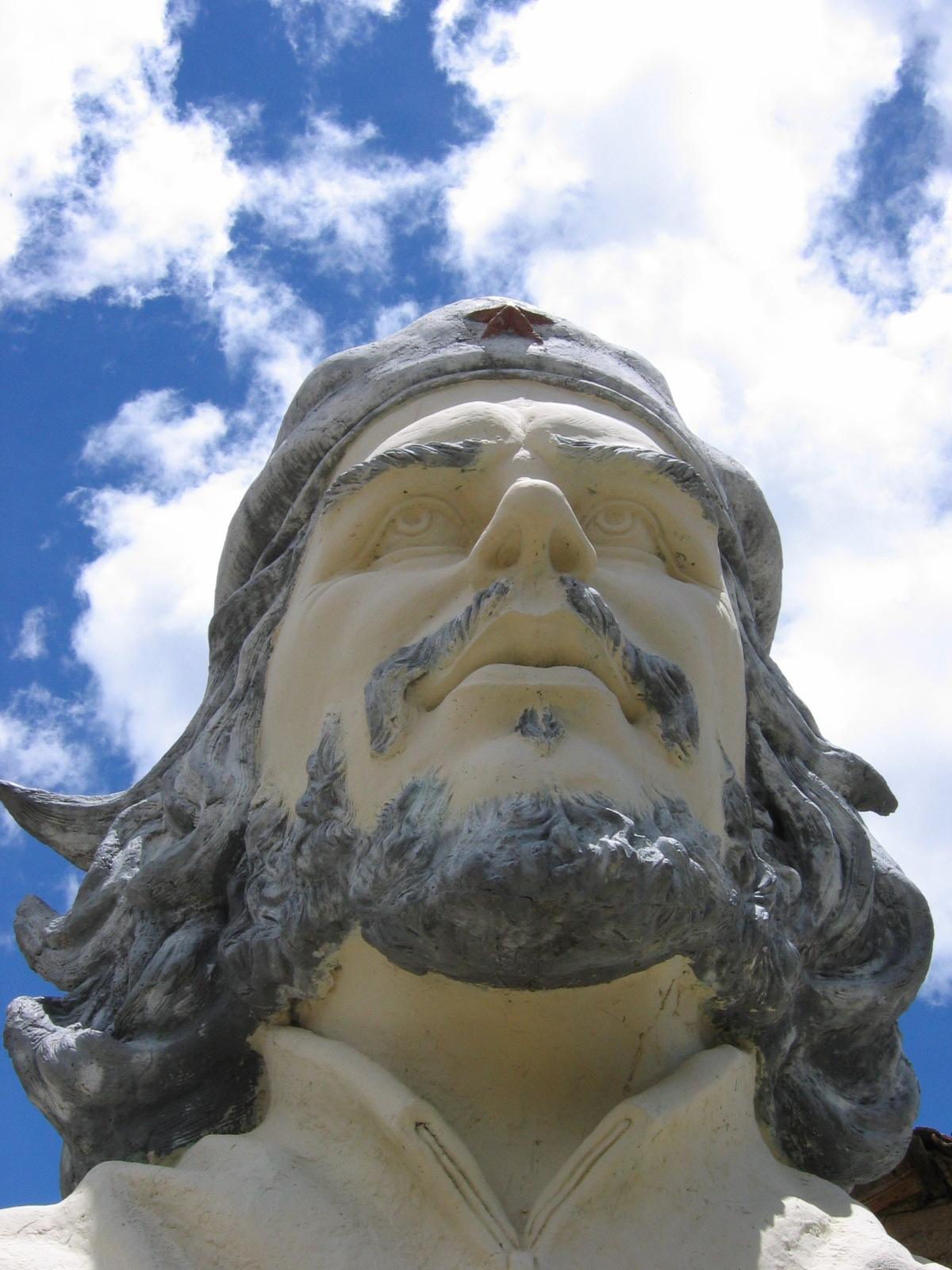
Bust (close up)

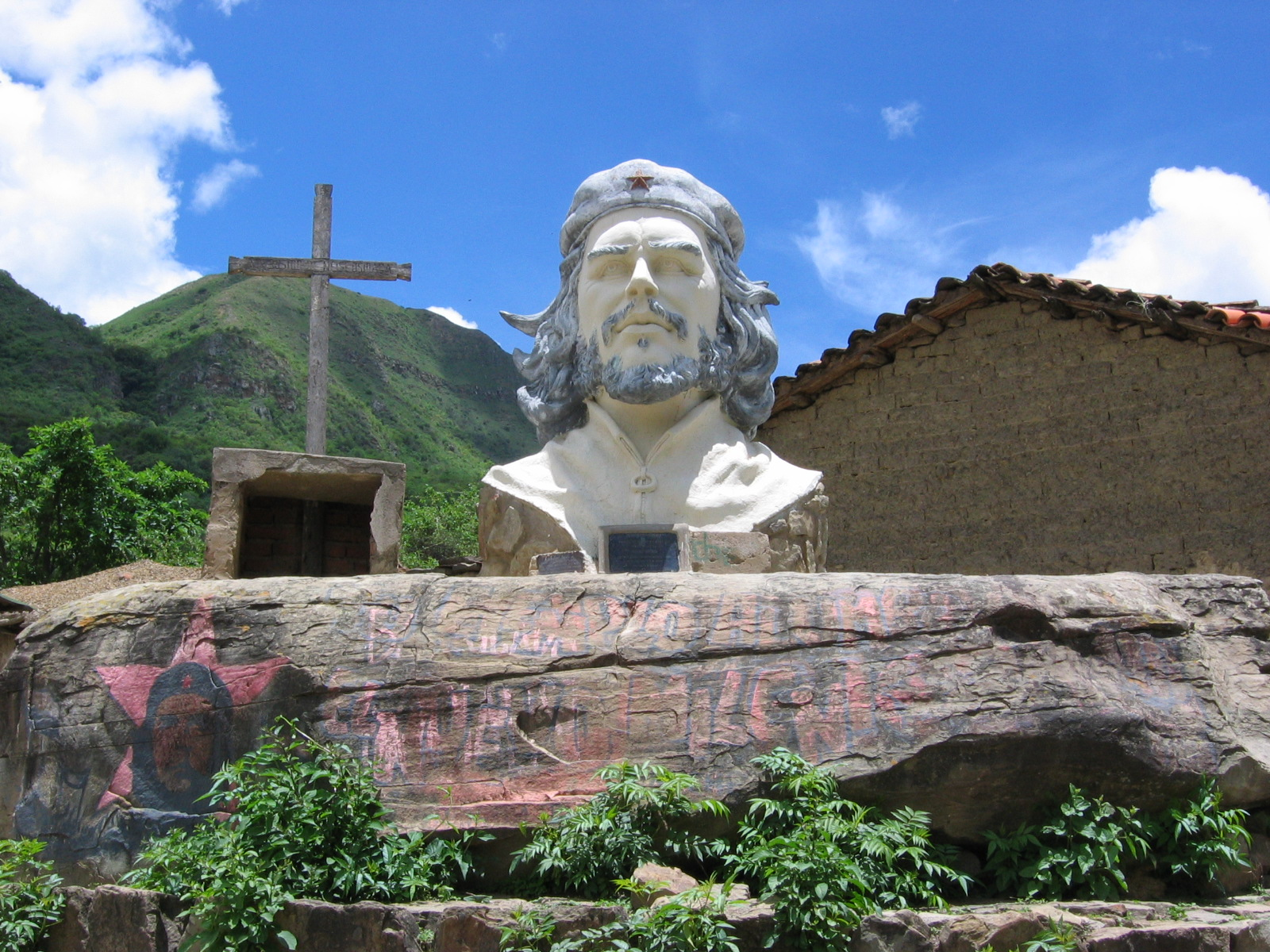
Bust

=== Vallegrande ===
The military command, and especially the Bolivian Rangers was installed in Vallegrande, together with CIA agents, who were sent to the region to fight the Ñancahuazú guerrillas. Vallegrande is in the Department of Santa Cruz, at an altitude of 2,030 meters and has about 6,000 inhabitants.

The hospital Nuestro Señor de Malta (Our Lord of Malta) is preserved there, as well as its famous laundry where the bodies of Che Guevara and some of his men were shown to the public. This was the place where the famous photographs were taken by Freddy Alborta, a Bolivian photographer and documentary filmmaker. They show a dead Guevara with his eyes open, an image that evokes those of Jesus Christ.

In addition the unmarked collective grave, discovered in 1997, in which he was buried together with seven other fighters, is preserved, as well as other graves where other members of the group are buried, and identified by the Argentine Forensic Anthropology Team.

== Planning and management of the Route of Che ==
The Route of Che was organized as a historic memorial and touristic attraction by the Assembly of the Guaraní people of Bolivia. Surprisingly, the initiative had the support of the Bolivian Army — the same that captured and executed Che Guevara.
