= Simeon Cuba Sarabia =

Bolivian-born Marxist (1935–1967)

Simeon Cuba Sarabia (Willy), ca. 1967

Simeón Cuba Sarabia (15 January 1935 – 9 October 1967), also known as Willy, was a member of the Ñancahuazú guerrilla column led by Che Guevara in Bolivia. Born in the Cochabamba region of Bolivia, he became a leader among tin miners in Huanuni and served as the secretary of organization and secretary of militias of the local mine workers' union. He also carried out various social service activities for the benefit of the miners' families. Cuba Sarabia joined the Communist Party of Bolivia (PCB) but resigned from it in 1965 to become a member of the Bolivian Marxist–Leninist Party which favored armed struggle. When he urged that group to put its principles into practice, he was expelled from it along with Moisés Guevara. It was Moisés Guevara who brought him into Che Guevara's Ñancahuazú guerrilla group in March 1967.

== Guerrilla fighter ==
Selected to be a member of the "center" unit which was led by Che Guevara himself, Willy came to be known as a disciplined and courageous combatant. Despite this, and perhaps as a result of his extremely reserved nature, Guevara developed suspicions about him and in his monthly summary for September 1967 wrote in his campaign diary that "The morale of the rest of the group has remained quite good, and I only have doubts about Willy, that he may take advantage of some havoc to try to escape by himself ... " His suspicions would soon prove to have been unfounded.

On 8 October 1967 when the guerrillas' final battle commenced in the Yuro Ravine, Willy was leading the "center" group as they tried to find a way to break out of the Army's encirclement. Willy was just at the point of clearing the steep wall of the ravine when Guevara, following some distance behind him, received a sudden blast of machine gun fire that wounded him in the leg. Willy turned around and went back down the cliff to where Guevara lay. He picked him up and carried him to a location out of the direct line of fire. However, the two guerrillas almost immediately found themselves surrounded by another group of rangers who opened fire against them; Guevara and Willy shot back at them until one of their bullets knocked Che's beret off his head and another disabled his M-2 carbine. Willy moved Guevara out of the line of fire again, then placed himself between his wounded leader and the rangers — who were now firing at them from a distance of less than ten yards — and began to return fire. In this exposed position, Willy was struck almost instantaneously by a hail of bullets and incapacitated. A group of rangers rushed forward, demanding their surrender. Seeing the soldiers approach Guevara, Willy confronted them and shouted, "This is Comandante Guevara. Show him respect!"

== Execution ==
The rangers took Guevara and Willy to the nearby village of La Higuera where they were imprisoned overnight in separate rooms of a small adobe schoolhouse. The next day, after the order issued by Bolivian President René Barrientos that they should both be killed had been confirmed, the commanding officer sent an execution squad consisting of three soldiers into the schoolhouse. The soldiers entered the room where Willy was being held first and riddled him with several bursts of machine gun fire. Before dying, Willy managed to cry out, "I am proud to die next to Che!"

The Bolivian Armed Forces refused to give information about what had been done with Cuba Sarabia's remains. Almost thirty years after his death, on 28 June 1997, a Cuban forensic team discovered his skeleton in the same burial pit situated on the auxiliary runway of the Vallegrande airport that contained the remains of Che Guevara and five other guerrillas. Willy's remains were transferred to Cuba along with those of Guevara and the five other combatants and, on 17 October 1997, their caskets were laid to rest with full military honors in the Che Guevara Mausoleum in the city of Santa Clara, Cuba.

== Content notes ==
expelled:

Moisés Guevara era un hombre deshonesto y criminal. Dirigente minero combativo, que buscaba fomentar una revolución. Se incorporó al partido comunista pro chino convencido de que Zamora y su dirección sinceramente se incorporarían a la lucha armada con un contingente proletario numeroso. Pronto se dio cuenta de que Zamora era tan oportunista y falso como otros auto denominados 'vanguardistas'. Sin embargo dentro del partido peleó por el cumplimiento de las promesas que se hacían al pueblo: Iniciar la lucha armada. En una conferencia partidaria realizada en Huanuni, precisamente la zona donde Moisés tenía mayor ascendiente, el PC lo expulsó, acusándolo de estar en 'contubernio con la camarilla de Monje' para ingresar a la guerrilla.

— Diario de campaña por Inti Peredo.

English translation:

Moisés Guevara was an dishonest man. A combative leader of mine workers who wanted to instigate a revolution. He joined the pro-Chinese communist party believing that Zamora and its other leaders truly would join the armed struggle with a numerous contingent of workers. He soon realized that Zamora was as opportunistic and deceitful as the other self-described 'members of the vanguard'. However, within the party he fought for the fulfillment of the promises that had been made to the people: i.e., to initiate the armed struggle. In a party conference held in Huanuni, which happened to be the zone where Moisés was most popular, the (ed: pro-Chinese) Communist Party expelled him, accusing him of being involved in 'a conspiracy with the clique of Monje' to join a guerrilla movement.

— Diario de campaña by Inti Peredo.
