= Querido Moheno =

Mexican politician (1873–1933)

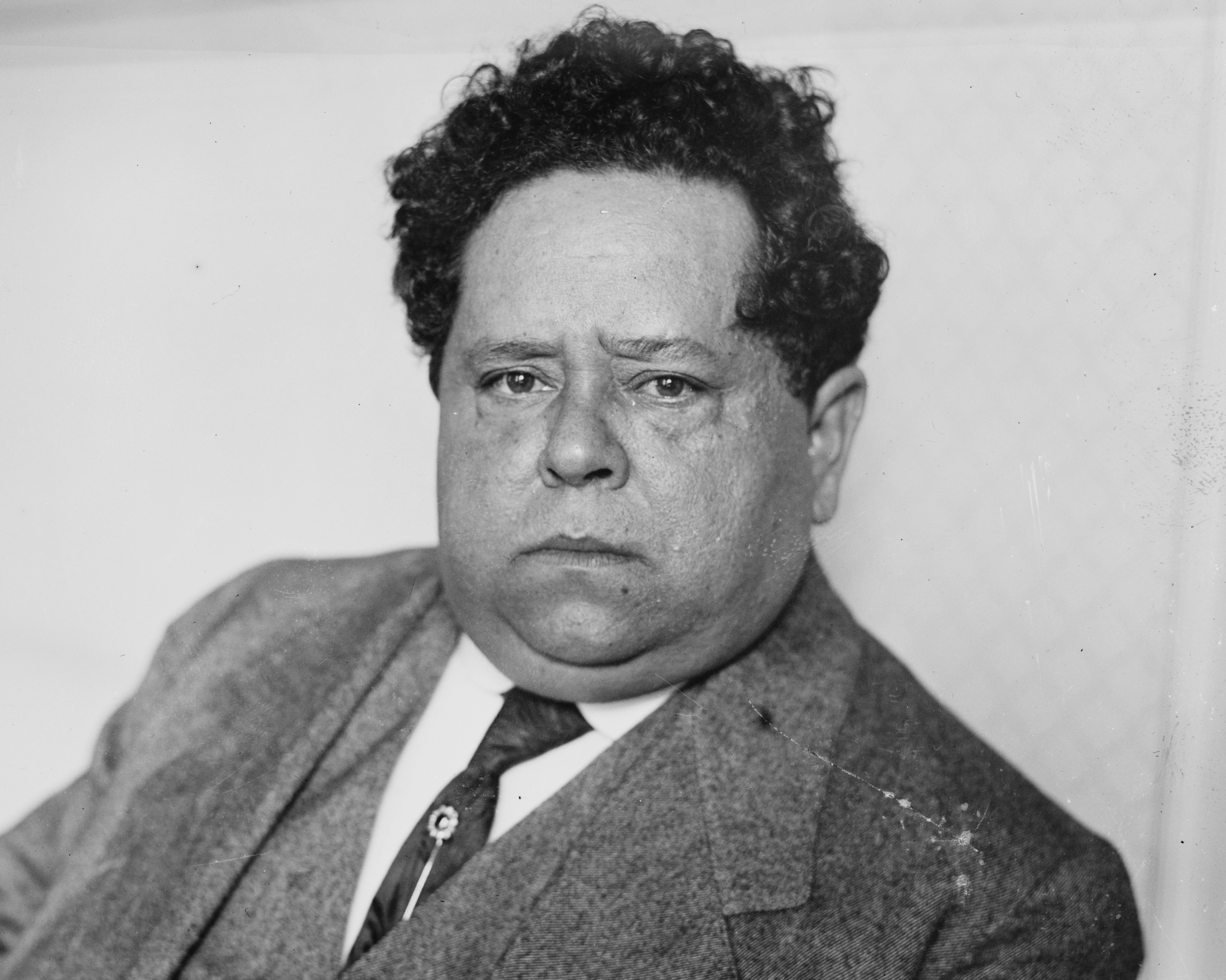
Querido Moheno Tabares on 21 April 1914

Querido Moheno Tabares (Note: In this Mexican name, the surname is Moheno and the second or maternal family name is Tabares.) (3 December 1873 – 12 April 1933) was the Secretary of Foreign Affairs in Mexico from 1913 to 1914.

== Life and career ==
Moheno Tabares was born in Pichucalco, Chiapas, on 3 December 1873. After primary education in his home town and secondary schooling in San Juan Bautista, Tabasco, he earned a law degree from the National Law School in 1897. He wrote for the newspapers El Demócrata and Nueva era and was jailed "many times" for his opposition to the regime of Porfirio Díaz. In 1912 he was elected to represent Chiapas's 6th district in the Chamber of Deputies and, in 1914, he was elected to the Senate. During his time in the lower house, he was a member of the El Cuadrilátero group, which vehemently opposed the administration of President Francisco I. Madero.

On 1 October 1913, he was appointed Secretary of Foreign Affairs in the cabinet of Victoriano Huerta. During his four months in office, he had to deal with the U.S. government's refusal to recognise the Huerta administration and with compensation demands from foreign governments for damage caused by the 1910 Revolution. He also had to explain Huerta's dissolution of Congress. On 17 February 1914 he was removed from Foreign Affairs and appointed Secretary of Development. He resigned from that position on 3 July 1914 and immediately went into exile in Cuba and, later, the United States.

He returned to Mexico in 1920. He died in Mexico City on 12 April 1933 and was buried in the Panteón Francés.

== Publications ==
Moheno Tabares's published works include:

- Mi Actuación Política Después de la Decena Trágica
- Los Doscientos Millones del Empréstito
- Cartas y Crónicas

== Gallery ==
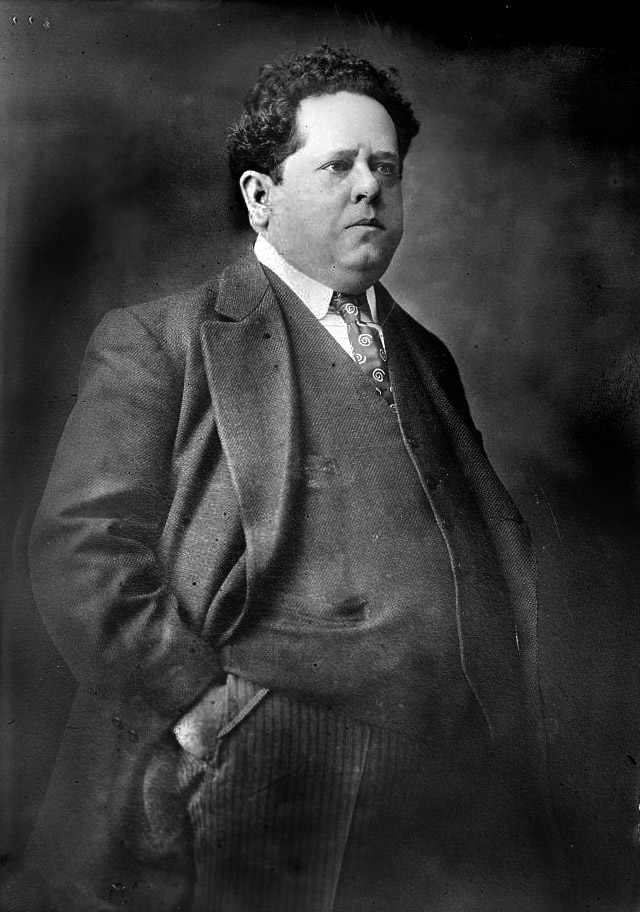

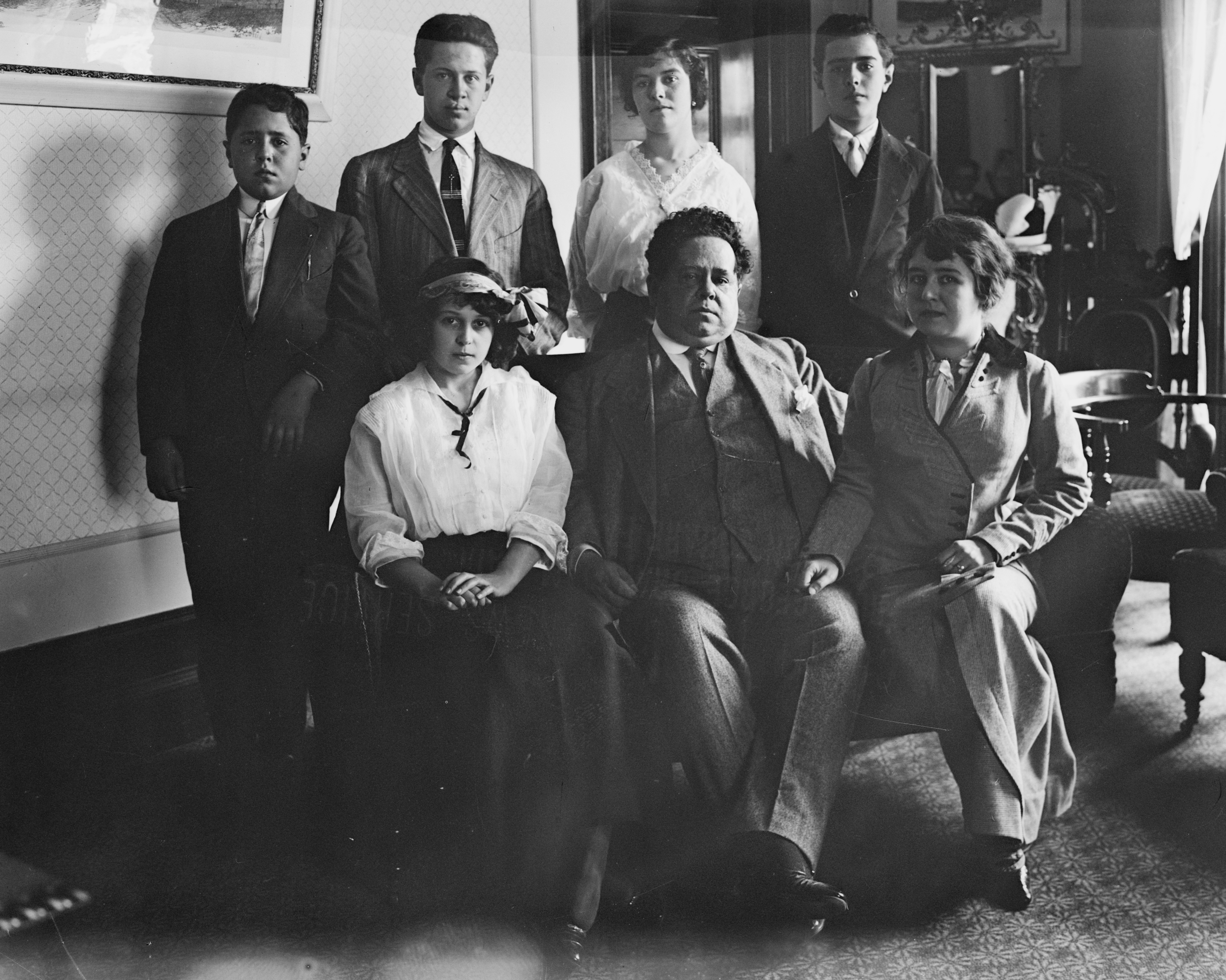
Querido Moheno Tabares and family in the 1910s
