= Ñancahuazú Guerrilla =

Group of guerrilla fighters led by Che Guevara in the Bolivian Cordillera, 1966-1967

- Part of the Cold War
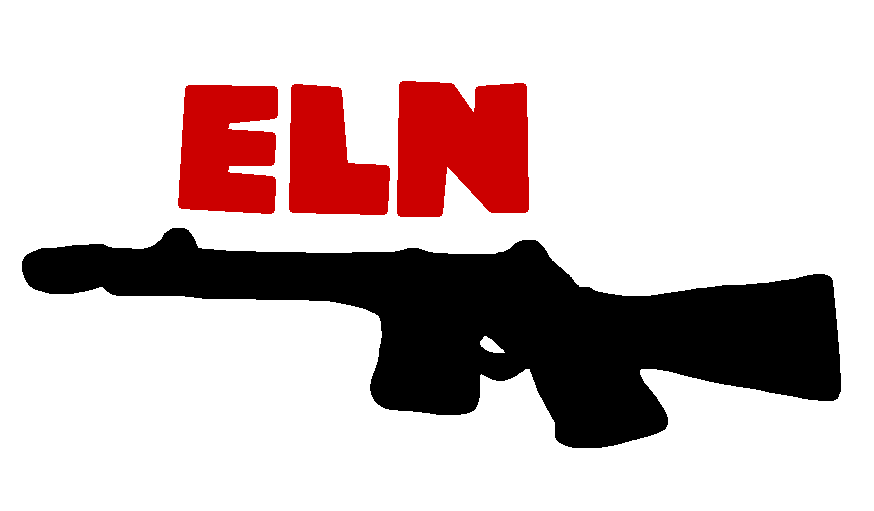
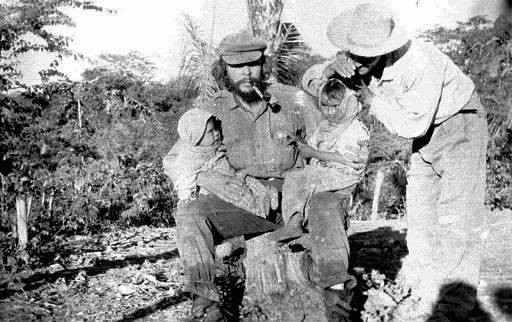
- Flag of the ELN during the Ñancahuazú Guerrilla Che Guevara in Bolivia in 1967
Date	3 November 1966 – 9 October 1967 (11 months and 6 days); Dissident Insurgency phase: 9 October 1967 - November 1967
Location	Bolivia
Result	Bolivian government victory: Che Guevara executed

Belligerents
ELN; Cuba	Bolivia; United States; Supported by: Brazil

Commanders and leaders
Che Guevara (executed); Tania Bunke †; Harry Villegas; Simeon Cuba Sarabia (executed); Juan Pablo Chang Navarro (executed)	René Barrientos (Bolivia) Hugo Banzer; Klaus Barbie; Félix Rodríguez; Ralph Shelton

Strength
29 Bolivians; 25 Cubans; 2 Peruvians; 1 Argentine-Cuban (Che); 1 Argentine-German (Tania); 2 Unknown Nationality Total: 60	600 Bolivian Rangers; 24 Americans Total: 624

Casualties and losses
Main phase: 55 killed or captured Dissident insurgency phase: 11+ killed	Main phase: Unknown; Dissident insurgency phase: 9+ killed, 4+ injured
- 20+ civilians killed, 72+ injured (San Juan massacre) Unknown total

National Liberation Army of Bolivia/Ñancahuazú Guerrilla
- Ejército de Liberación Nacional de Bolivia
- Founder: Che Guevara
- Leaders: Che Guevara (executed); Tania Bunke †; Harry Villegas; Simeon Cuba Sarabia (executed)
- Founded: 6 November 1966
- Dates active: 1966–1967
- Dissolved: November 1967
- Country: Bolivia
- Allegiance: Communist Party of Cuba (partially); Communist Party of Bolivia (formerly)
- Headquarters: Near Santa Cruz de la Sierra, Cordillera Province, Bolivia
- Active regions: Bolivia
- Ideology: Vanguardism-Foquismo; Marxist-Leninist Communism; Guerrillerismo; Left-wing populism Anti-imperialism
- Political position: Far-left
- Status: Inactive
- Size: 60 (total)
- Wars: ELN Insurgency in Bolivia

The Ñancahuazú Guerrilla or Ejército de Liberación Nacional de Bolivia (National Liberation Army of Bolivia; ELN) was a group of mainly Bolivian and Cuban guerrillas led by the guerrilla leader Che Guevara which was active in the Cordillera Province of Bolivia from 1966 to 1967. The group established its base camp on a farm across the Ñancahuazú River, a seasonal tributary of the Rio Grande, 250 kilometers southwest of the city of Santa Cruz de la Sierra. The guerrillas intended to work as a foco, a point of armed resistance to be used as a first step to overthrow the Bolivian government and create a socialist state. The guerrillas defeated several Bolivian patrols before they were beaten and Guevara was captured and executed. Only five guerrillas managed to survive and fled to Chile.

== Background ==
=== Congo Crisis ===
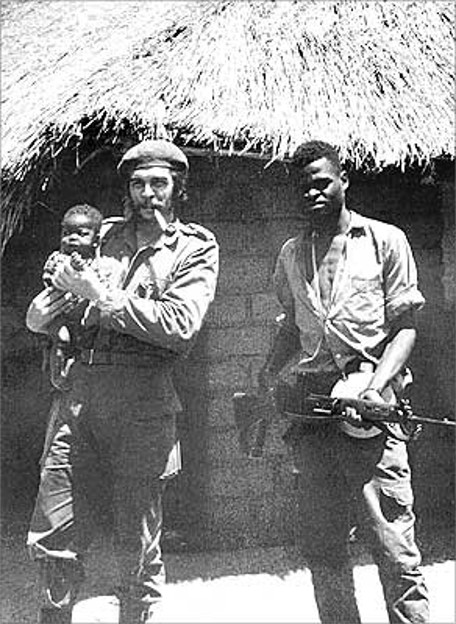
Che Guevara at his basecamp holding a local African infant and standing next to a fellow Afro-Cuban soldier in the Congo during the Congo Crisis, 1965.

Che Guevara was committed to ending American imperialism, and he decided to travel to the Congo during its civil war to back the anti-capitalist guerrilla groups. Guevara's aim was to export the revolution by instructing local anti-Mobutu Simba fighters in Marxist ideology and foco theory strategies of guerrilla warfare. In his Congo Diary, he cites the incompetence, intransigence and infighting of the local Congolese forces as key reasons for the insurgency's failure. On 20 November 1965, in ill health with dysentery, suffering from acute asthma, and disheartened after seven months of frustrations and inactivity, Guevara left the Congo with the Cuban survivors (six members of his 12-man column had died). At one point, Guevara considered sending the wounded back to Cuba and fighting in Congo alone until his death, as an ideological example. After being urged by his comrades and pressed by two emissaries sent by Castro, at the last moment, Guevara reluctantly agreed to leave Africa. In speaking about his experience in the Congo months later, Guevara concluded that he left rather than fight to the death because: "The human element for the revolution in the Congo had failed. The people have no will to fight. The revolutionary leaders are corrupt. In simple words... there was nothing to do." A few weeks later, when writing the preface to the diary he kept during the Congo venture, he began: "This is the story of a failure."

At a meeting in Madrid, Juan Perón, who was sympathetic to Guevara but disapproved of Guevara's choice of guerrilla warfare as antiquated, warned Guevara about starting operations in Bolivia.

...you will not survive in Bolivia. Suspend that plan. Search for alternatives. [...] Do not commit suicide.

— Juan Perón to Che Guevara

== Guerrilla operations ==
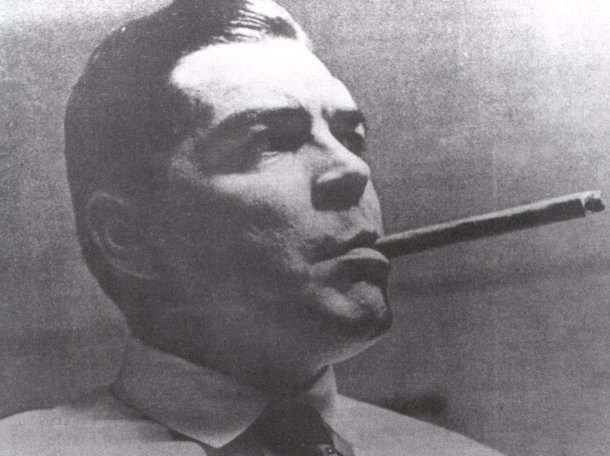
Guevara as "Adolfo Mena González" in 1966

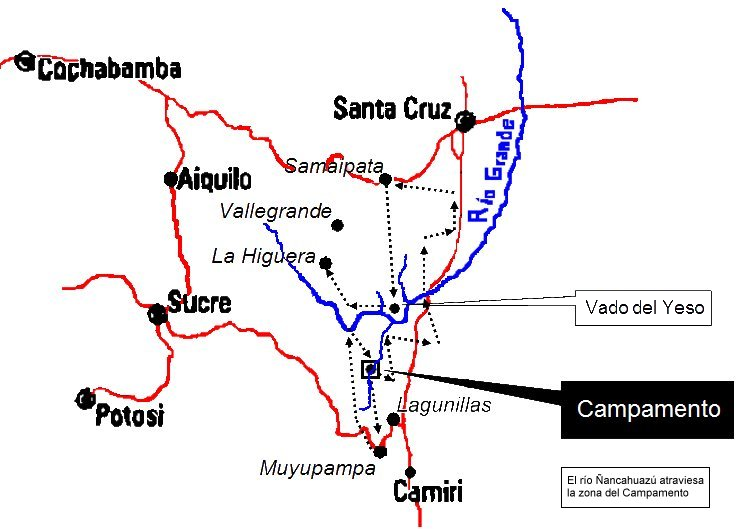
The "Che route". The dotted line marks the path of the guerrilla group led by Guevara to the place where he was shot. Today it is a tourist circuit.

Guevara entered Bolivia with the pseudonym "Adolfo Mena González" on 3 November 1966. Three days later, he left the capital city of La Paz for the countryside. He planned to organize a foco with Bolivia as his target. Planning to start a guerrilla campaign against the military government of President René Barrientos, he assembled a band of 29 Bolivians, 25 Cubans, and a few foreigners, which included Guevara himself, one woman from East Germany named Tamara Bunke, and three Peruvians. This small but well-armed group carried out two successful ambushes against two army patrols in the spring of 1967, but failed to gain significant support from fellow opposition groups in Bolivia's cities or from local civilians, some of whom willingly informed the authorities of the guerrillas' movements.

Barrientos was very concerned with Guevara's rising insurgency, and clamped down on popular protest with some very heavy-handed measures (such as the San Juan massacre). Guevara felt that such an atrocity by the Bolivian Army and Air Force would be the tipping point in his favor in rallying the miners to his guerrilla insurgency, but he did not make contact with the political organization of the miners himself, preferring to negotiate with representatives of the Bolivian Communist Party. He also chose to locate his insurgency far from the locations of strong political organization among workers and indigenous communities.

As part of the operation, Bunke managed to infiltrate Bolivian high society to the point of winning the adoration of President Barrientos and even going on holiday with him to Peru. Bunke used her position to relay intelligence to the guerrillas and act as their contact with the outside world. In late 1966, the unreliability of many of her comrades in the urban network set up to support the guerrillas forced her to travel to their rural camp at Ñancahuazú on a number of occasions. On one of these trips, a captured Bolivian communist gave away a safe house where her jeep was parked in which she had left her address book. As a result, her cover was blown, and she had to join Guevara's armed guerrilla campaign. With the loss of their only contact with the outside world, the guerrillas found themselves isolated.

By mid-1967, Guevara's men became fugitives, hunted down by Bolivian special forces and their American advisors. In the last few months of the venture, Guevara wrote in his diary that: "Talking to these peasants is like talking to statues. They do not give us any help. Worse still, many of them are turning into informants." The guerrillas suffered heavy losses in a series of clashes with the Bolivian Army. Constantly on the move and facing shortages of food, medicine, and equipment, Guevara's guerrillas were worn down and several desertions occurred. Units of the Bolivian Army's 4th and 8th Divisions cordoned off the general area where Guevara was operating, gradually encircling the guerrillas. The rough terrain of canyons, rolling hills with deep thorn-infested ravines, and thick vegetation hampered the army's search for the guerrillas, all the while the guerrillas kept moving, trying to find a way to escape from the encirclement.

On 31 August 1967, a small group of the guerrillas, totaling eight men as well as Bunke, were ambushed and killed by Bolivian soldiers as they attempted to cross the Rio Grande in Bolivia. On 26 September 1967, Guevara's band, which by then had been reduced to 22 guerrillas, entered the village of La Higuera, which they found almost deserted. There, Guevara discovered that the Bolivian authorities knew of his presence in the area when he found a telegram to the village mayor warning of the band's approach. As the guerrillas left the village, they fell into another Bolivian Army ambush and three more were killed. The guerrillas then fled two kilometers west into the rugged canyons of the area. Two more guerrillas deserted during the retreat.

On 8 October 1967, the Bolivian Army's 2nd Ranger Battalion located Guevara's band. Most of the surviving guerrillas were surrounded and destroyed as a fighting force by the Bolivian Army Rangers. The fighting ended with Guevara's capture. Still, some guerrillas remained active across Bolivia during the rest of October and November 1967. Meanwhile, the Bolivian Army continued to hunt down the remaining guerrillas. In fighting that lasted from 8 to 14 October, the Bolivian Army Rangers killed 11 guerrillas for the loss of 9 killed and 4 wounded. Five other guerrillas - Daniel Alarcón Ramírez, Leonardo Tamayo Núñez, David Adriazola, Harry Villegas, and Inti Peredo - survived and escaped into Chile.

=== Guevara's capture and execution ===
Félix Rodríguez, a Cuban exile turned CIA Special Activities Division operative, trained and advised Bolivian troops during the hunt for Guevara in Bolivia.

On 7 October, a local informant apprised the Bolivian special forces of the location of Guevara's guerrilla encampment in the Yuro ravine. On 8 October, they encircled the area with 180 soldiers, and Guevara was wounded and taken prisoner while leading a detachment with Simeon Cuba Sarabia by a Bolivian Army Ranger unit commanded by Captain Gary Prado Salmón. Che biographer Jon Lee Anderson reports Bolivian Sergeant Bernardino Huanca's account: that a twice wounded Guevara, his gun rendered useless, shouted "Do not shoot! I am Che Guevara and worth more to you alive than dead."

Guevara was tied up and taken to a dilapidated mud schoolhouse in the nearby village of La Higuera on the night of 8 October. For the next half day, Guevara refused to be interrogated by Bolivian officers and would only speak quietly to Bolivian soldiers. One of those Bolivian soldiers, helicopter pilot Jaime Nino de Guzman, describes Che as looking "dreadful". According to de Guzman, Guevara was shot through the right calf, his hair was matted with dirt, his clothes were shredded, and his feet were covered in rough leather sheaths. Despite his haggard appearance, he recounts that "Che held his head high, looked everyone straight in the eyes and asked only for something to smoke." De Guzman states that he "took pity" and gave him a small bag of tobacco for his pipe, with Guevara then smiling and thanking him. Later on the night of 8 October, Guevara, despite having his hands tied, kicked Bolivian Officer Captain Espinosa into the wall, after the officer entered the schoolhouse in order to snatch Guevara's pipe from his mouth as a souvenir. In another instance of defiance, Guevara spat in the face of Bolivian Rear Admiral Ugarteche shortly before his execution. Captain Prado told Guevara that he would be taken to the city of Santa Cruz de la Sierra and court-martialed there.

The following morning on 9 October, Guevara asked to see the "maestra" (school teacher) of the village, 22-year-old Julia Cortez. Cortez would later state that she found Guevara to be an "agreeable looking man with a soft and ironic glance" and that during their short conversation she found herself "unable to look him in the eye" because his "gaze was unbearable, piercing, and so tranquil." During their short conversation, Guevara pointed out to Cortez the poor condition of the schoolhouse, stating that it was "anti-pedagogical" to expect campesino students to be educated there, while "government officials drive Mercedes cars" ... declaring "that's what we are fighting against."

Later that morning on 9 October, President Barrientos ordered that Guevara be killed. The order was relayed to Rodríguez, who in turn informed the commander of the Bolivian Army's 8th Division, Colonel Joaquin Zenteno Anaya. The US government wanted Guevara to be taken to Panama for interrogation and the CIA had placed aircraft on standby for such a transfer. Rodríguez had been told to keep Guevara alive. He asked Anaya to allow Guevara to be taken into CIA custody in Panama, but Anaya insisted that the order to execute him be carried out. The executioner was Mario Terán, a young sergeant in the Bolivian Army who had requested to shoot Che on the basis of the fact that three of his friends from B Company, all named "Mario", had been killed in an earlier firefight with Guevara's band of guerrillas. To make the bullet wounds appear consistent with the story the government planned to release to the public, Rodríguez told Terán not to shoot Guevara in the head, but to aim carefully to make it appear that Guevara had been killed in action during a clash with the Bolivian army. Captain Prado said that the possible reasons Barrientos ordered the immediate execution of Guevara is so there would be no possibility that Guevara would escape from prison, and also so there would be no drama in regard to a trial.

Before Guevara was executed he was asked by a Bolivian soldier if he was thinking about his own immortality. "No", he replied, "I'm thinking about the immortality of the revolution." A few minutes later, Sergeant Terán entered the hut and ordered the other soldiers out. Alone with Terán, Che Guevara then stood up and spoke to his executioner: "I know you've come to kill me." Terán pointed his M2 carbine at Guevara, but hesitated and Guevara spat at Terán which were his last words: "Shoot, coward! You are only going to kill a man!" Terán then opened fire, hitting Guevara in the arms and legs. For a few seconds, Guevara writhed on the ground, apparently biting one of his wrists to avoid crying out. Terán then fired several times again, wounding him fatally in the chest at 1:10 pm, according to Rodríguez. In all, Guevara was shot by Terán nine times. This included five times in the legs, once in the right shoulder and arm, once in the chest, and finally in the throat.

Months earlier, during his last public declaration to the Tricontinental Conference, Guevara wrote his own epitaph, stating "Wherever death may surprise us, let it be welcome, provided that this our battle cry may have reached some receptive ear and another hand may be extended to wield our weapons."

== Aftermath ==
After he was killed, Guevara's body was lashed to the landing skids of a helicopter and flown to nearby Vallegrande, where photographs were taken of him lying on a concrete slab in the laundry room of the Nuestra Señora de Malta. As hundreds of local residents filed past the body, many of them considered Guevara's corpse to represent a "Christ-like" visage, with some of them even surreptitiously clipping locks of his hair as divine relics. Such comparisons were further extended when two weeks later upon seeing the post-mortem photographs, English art critic John Berger observed that they resembled two famous paintings: Rembrandt's The Anatomy Lesson of Dr. Nicolaes Tulp and Andrea Mantegna's Lamentation over the Dead Christ. There were also four correspondents present when Guevara's body arrived in Vallegrande, including Bjorn Kumm of the Swedish Aftonbladet, who described the scene in an 11 November 1967, exclusive for The New Republic.

Bolivia had defeated its last major insurgency to date. President Barrientos himself died in a helicopter crash on 27 April 1969. Most of Guevara's men were killed, wounded, or captured in the campaign.

On 17 February 1968, five surviving guerrillas, three Cubans and two Bolivians, managed to get to Chile. There they were detained by policing carabiniers and sent to Iquique. On 22 February, the guerrillas applied for asylum. While in Iquique, they were visited by Salvador Allende, then president of the senate of Chile. After the guerrilla's meeting with Allende and other prominent leftist politicians, the interior minister of the Christian Democrat government Edmundo Pérez Zujovic decided to expel the guerrillas from Chile. Due to problems in obtaining transit visas the journey to Cuba was done via Tahiti and New Zealand.

After the failure of Guevara's insurgency, radical leftists in Bolivia began to organize again to set up guerrilla resistance in 1970 in what is known today as the Teoponte Guerrilla.

Fernando Gómez, a former member of the Ñancahuazú Guerrilla, led the formation of Salvador Allende's informal bodyguard prior to the 1970 Chilean presidential election. By the time of the election, the bodyguard had expanded with the addition of more ex-Ñancahuazú Guerrillas volunteering to provide security to Allende and, later, members of the Revolutionary Left Movement (MIR). On one of Allende's first public appearances after his inauguration, a Chilean journalist inquired of the president who the armed men were accompanying him, to which Allende replied "a group of personal friends", giving the group the moniker from which it would thereafter be known.

On 11 May 1976, Joaquin Zenteno Anaya, a career officer who was the person in charge of the Bolivian military region of Santa Cruz when Guevara captured and executed there, was shot dead in broad daylight underneath a subway bridge over the Seine River in Paris, France. At the time of his assassination, Anaya was Bolivia's Ambassador to France. In a phone call to Agence France-Presse, an unidentified person said the "International Che GueVara Brigades" claimed responsibility for the slaying.
