= Guerrillerismo =

Spanish word for Cuban "guerrilla mentality"

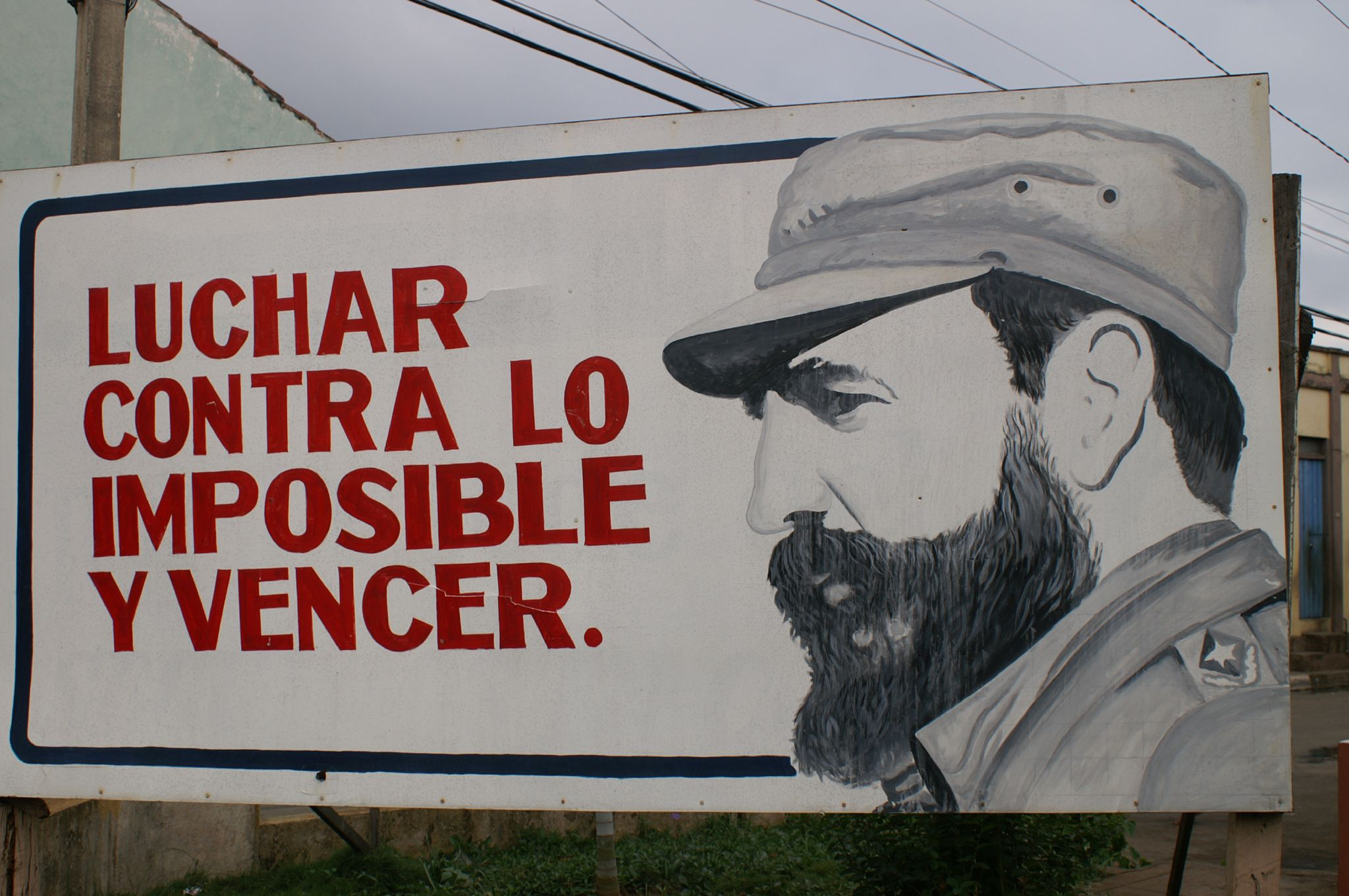
Billboard of Fidel Castro in Cuba, with the phrase (translated in English): "Fight against the impossible and win", embodying guerrillerista rhetoric which emphases struggle.

Guerrillerismo (pronounced [geriʝeˈɾismo]), is a Spanish word, sometimes translated into English as guerrilla mentality or guerrilla ethos, which refers to a style of political action and rhetoric that has been heavily promoted by the Cuban government since the Cuban Revolution. It promotes passion and selflessness as a means to solve social problems, rather than methodical planning or institution building. The term is in reference to the guerrillas of the Cuban Revolution who are praised as the original models of guerrillerismo. The rhetorical use of guerrillerismo in describing economic planning, often alludes to how Cuban economic plans are part of the same militant struggle that the Cuban Revolution was itself a part of; thus justifying the militarization of economic activities.

The term "guerrillerismo" was first used by Che Guevara in his 1963 essay Against bureaucratism, which defended the idiosyncratic style of Cuban government, and justified it by stating it existed within the guerrilla legacy of the Cuban Revolution. Since Guevara's essay, historians have used the term to varying degrees when describing Cuban policy. Historian Antoni Kapcia has used the term when describing Cuban policy and rhetoric in the 1960s, while historian Anna Clayfield has argued that the term is applicable to Cuban policy and rhetoric throughout the longer history of the post-revolutionary government.

== Concept ==
The concept was originally named by Che Guevara in his 1963 essay Against bureaucratism, in which Guevara laments about the history of the Cuban Revolution and the later economic and political issues of Cuba. In the essay, Guevara discusses the "guerrilla" nature of the Cuban government, stating:

Our revolution was essentially the product of a guerrilla movement that initiated the armed struggle against the dictatorship and brought it to fruition in the seizure of power. The first steps of the revolutionary state, like the whole of the primitive epoch of our management of the government, were strongly tinged by fundamental elements of guerrilla tactics as a form of state administration. “Guerrillaism” translated the experience of the armed struggle in the Cuban mountains and countryside into the work of the different administrative and mass organizations, and this meant that only the main revolutionary slogans were followed — and often interpreted in different ways — by bodies in the administration and in society in general. The method of solving concrete problems was chosen at will by each leader.

Later in the essay, Guevara recognizes that the bureaucratization of the economy was necessary to create a sense of direction, and end contradictory orders. However, Guevara argues that bureaucratization should now be eliminated, because it has fostered a sort of over-complexity in decision-making, and an idleness amongst bureaucrats.

== Historiography ==
The term "guerrillerismo" originally conceived by Guevara, has been used by various historians to describe certain periods of Cuban policy and state rhetoric. These are policies and arguments are usually called "guerrillerista" because they often eschew bureaucracy and make reference to the guerrilla warfare of the Cuban Revolution.

Peter Lambert claimed in his 2006 book Political Violence and the Construction of National Identity in Latin America, that a Cuban sense of lucha ("struggle") that developed after 1959, as a guerrillerista sensibility. According to Lambert, Cuban lucha, is an idea that Cuba is locked in a constant struggle with the United States, and this struggle justifies selfless labor, mandated political unity, and loyalty to vanguardist leaders. In a general, all Cuban activities, whether civilian or military, are part of this struggle. Lambert claims that a sense of lucha decreased after the failure of the 1968 Revolutionary Offensive and following zafra, but never totally exited Cuban politics.

Historian Antoni Kapcia, first wrote of guerrillerismo in 2006, describing it as the rhetorical use of the Cuban Revolution, when justifying government plans. Cuban officials often alluded that public projects were part of the same "guerrilla" struggle that the Cuban Revolution was a part of.

David Priestland claimed in his 2016 book The Red Flag A History of Communism, that Cuban mass mobilizations like the 1961 literacy campaign are examples of guerrillerista strategy in that Cuban leaders envisioned these public projects as akin to military campaigns, and their civilian participants as citizen-soldiers.

Anna Clayfield argues in the 2018 book Cuba's Forgotten Decade that guerrillerismo was a rhetorical tactic that linked Cuban policy to the guerrilla heritage of the Cuban Revolution. This style of rhetoric never left Cuban politics, and was even utilized during the 1970s, the era when many believed Cuba was divorcing itself from its guerrilla heritage, and embracing a sovietization. Clayfield notes that the heavy militarization of society in the 1970s was done with the argument that since the military descends from the guerrilla struggle it is most worthy of managing Cuban society. In her 2019 book The Guerrilla Legacy of the Cuban Revolution, Clayfield agrees with the definition of guerrillerismo given by Kapcia, but argues that guerrillerismo existed past the 1960s, and in actuality describes the rhetoric used in Cuba to justify the militarization and other government affairs, by arguing that government efforts are an extension of the valiant guerrilla struggle of the Cuban Revolution.

Par Kumaraswami made the claim that Anna Clayfield's work has revised the common understanding of Cuba having a "siege mentality", and that instead, the common use of guerrillerismo, proves that Cuba was more confrontational in its diplomatic affairs, than defensive.
