= Loyola Guzmán =

Loyola Guzmán Lara

Personal details
- Born: July 29, 1942 Inquisivi, La Paz, Bolivia
- Party: Civic Community (since 2018)
- Other political affiliations: Frente Amplio (2013-2014); Movement for Socialism (2006-2007); National Liberation Army of Bolivia (1967-1972); Bolivian Communist Youth (until 1967)
- Occupation: Human rights and political activist

Loyola Guzmán Lara is a Bolivian human rights and political activist, founder of the Latin American Federation of Associations for Relatives of Detained-Disappeared (FEDEFAM) and a previous member of the National Liberation Army of Bolivia (ELN).

== Biography ==
=== Early life and political activism ===
Loyola studied literature at the Higher University of San Andrés and was a member of the National Executive Committee of the Bolivian Communist Youth.

=== ELN ===
In 1967 Loyola abandoned her studies and on January 26, 1967, she met Che Guevara at the ELN's Ñancahuazú camp. She made a very good impression on Che, who described her in his diary as "young and softly spoken .... but very determined" and assigned her as the "national finance secretary" of ELN, to handle the finances of the movements urban apparatus.

In February 1967 she left the Bolivian Communist Youth.

On August 4, 1967, the Bolivian Army was led to the guerillas main supply cache at the Ñacahuazú farm caves by a deserter. There they discovered documents including photos of Loyola in the company of leading guerilla members, leading to the arrest of Loyola alongside hundreds of others suspected of collaborating with the ELN on the 14th of September. She was freed in 1970, in exchange for German hostages captures by the guerilla force at Teoponte.

In the early 1970s the ELN became active again in clandestine struggle against the Hugo Banzer dictatorship and Loyola once again participated in this struggle alongside her husband, Félix Melgar Antel, a fellow militant of the ELN. However, in 1972 she was detained while entering Chile clandestinely with her husband, who was subsequently disappeared.

=== FEDEFAM and the Movement for Socialism ===
Loyola was a founder and leader of the Latin American Federation of Associations for Relatives of Detained-Disappeared (FEDEFAM) from 1983 until January 2009, where she actively participated in the fight against forced disappearance for political and union reasons in Latin America and in the world.

From 2006 to 2007 she was part of the Constituent Assembly as a constituent of the Movement for Socialism, where she took dissenting and critical positions.

=== Activism against Evo Morales ===
Loyola subsequently assumed a critical stance against the government of Evo Morales. In January 2009, she voted NO in the 2009 Bolivian constitutional referendum, giving her reasons at a press conference in the city of La Paz.

In September 2013, as a member of the Foro de la Ciudadanía Democrática, she signed an agreement to build the "Frente Amplio" (Broad Front) against Evo Morales, of which she became a spokesperson. The group consisted of 5 organizations including the National Unity Front led by the businessman Samuel Doria Medina.

In June 2014, when the electoral agreement was signed between Doria Medina and Ruben Costas Aguilera to form the Democrat Social Movement, the Broad Front was broken and did not participate in the parliamentary and presidential elections that took place in October 2014.

She supported Carlos Mesa, leader of the Civic Community coalition in the 2019 Bolivian general election, and also stood herself as a candidate for senator for the Civic Community coalition. During the 2019 Bolivian political crisis she denied there had been a coup d'etat against the MAS government, instead calling it a result of a grassroot mobilization of people indignant that MAS was stealing the vote. She denied that this mobilization was right-wing, claiming that the protests were in defense of democracy and highlighted the participation of young people. She blamed the MAS government for dividing and polarizing Bolivia stating "This government has managed to divide us, it has put indigenous against non-indigenous, poor against rich". She also called Evo Morales "a coward" for leaving the country, and furthermore said that if there had indeed been a coup Morales should've stayed in the country resisting with the people and not ask his base to "go out and get themselves killed or tell them to go out to kill". She held Morales and MAS responsible for Jeanine Áñez assuming the acting presidency of Bolivia, blaming it on the resignation of the legislative authorities who according to her should've assumed the presidency.

== Awards and distinctions ==
- 25 years of Democracy distinction, awarded by the Higher University of San Andrés in 2007.
