= Tania, the Woman Che Guevara Loved =

1997 book by José Antonio Friedl Zapata about Haydée Tamara Bunke Bider

- Author: José Antonio Friedl Zapata
- Original title: Tania : die Frau, die Che Guevera liebte
- Subject: Tamara Bunke
- Publication date: 1997
- ISBN: 978-3-351-02465-9

Tania, the Woman Che Guevara Loved is the English translation of a book by José Antonio Friedl Zapata, about Tamara Bunke (November 19, 1937 – August 31, 1967), better known as Tania or Tania the Guerrilla, who was a communist revolutionary and spy who played a prominent role in the Cuban government after the Cuban Revolution and in various Latin American revolutionary movements. She was the only woman to fight alongside Bolivian Marxist rebels under the command of Che Guevara.

It was published first in German as Tania : die Frau, die Che Guevera liebte in 1997, and then in Spanish as Tania la guerrillera : la enigmática espía a la sombra del Che.

Tamara Bunke's mother, Nadia Bunke, sued Friedl Zapata's German publisher in court in Germany, arguing his book was defamatory. She presented documentation refuting Friedl Zapata's claims that her daughter was a triple agent. Friedl Zapata also claimed her daughter had an affair with Guevara in Prague, even though records show they were never there at the same time. Ultimately, the lawsuit was successful; the court ruled that the book was defamatory and blocked it from being sold in Germany.
