= Dámaso José Lescaille Tabares =

Cuban revolutionary, journalist and diplomat

Ambassador of Cuba to Algeria
- In office 1988–1991

Ambassador of Cuba to Mauritania
- In office 1988–1991

Ambassador of Cuba to the Sahrawi Arab Democratic Republic
- In office 1988–1991

Ambassador of Cuba to South Yemen
- In office November 1981 – March 1985

Ambassador of Cuba to Jamaica
- In office August 1978 – November 1980
- Preceded by: Carlos Larrañaga Díaz
- Succeeded by: Carlos Larrañaga Díaz

Deputy head of the Americas Department
- In office 1975–1978

Personal details
- Born: December 11, 1934 Santiago de Cuba, Cuba
- Died: January 26, 2014 (aged 79) Havana, Cuba
- Party: Communist Party of Cuba
- Occupation: Diplomat, journalist, intelligence officer, revolutionary
- Known for: Collaboration with Che Guevara and Tamara Bunke

Dámaso José Lescaille Tabares (nom de guerre Ulises Estrada; December 11, 1934 – January 27, 2014) was a Cuban revolutionary, journalist, intelligence officer and ambassador.

== Career ==
From a young age, Lescaille Tabares engaged in clandestine activities against the regime of Fulgencio Batista. In 1959, he was among the founders of the Dirección General de Inteligencia. During the early 1960s, he provided training to Tamara Bunke.

In 1965, he accompanied Che Guevara to Kigoma, participated in missions during the Guinea-Bissau War of Independence, and acquired proficiency in the Swahili language. In 1970, he served as a counselor at the embassy in Algiers. On September 11, 1973, he acted as a military adviser in Santiago de Chile. From 1975 to August 1978, he held the position of deputy head of the American Department of the Central Committee of the Communist Party of Cuba.

From August 1978 to November 1980, he served as Ambassador in Kingston, Jamaica. On August 30, 1979, Jamaican opposition leader Edward Seaga alleged that Estrada had a questionable background and was recognized as a political activist. In 1980, when Seaga became prime minister, Estrada was declared persona non grata. He subsequently led the Directorate of the Non-Aligned Movement and held the position of Director of Africa and the Middle East in the Ministry of Foreign Affairs (Cuba).

From November 1981 to March 1985, Lescaille Tabares served as ambassador to Aden (South Yemen). From 1987 to 1991, he was ambassador to Algiers, concurrently accredited to Nouakchott, Mauritania, and the Sahrawi Arab Democratic Republic.

Lescaille Tabares also assumed the role of editor-in-chief for the newspapers Granma International and El Habanero, as well as the magazine Tricontinental.
