= David Priestland =

British historian

- Occupations: Historian and academic
- Title: Professor of Modern History

Academic background
- Education: University of Oxford
- Thesis: Ideological conflict within the Bolshevik Party, 1917-1939: The question of bureaucracy and democracy (1991)

Academic work
- Discipline: History
- Sub-discipline: Political history; History of the Soviet Union; History of communism; Intellectual history; Global history; History of capitalism
- Institutions: Lincoln College, Oxford; St Edmund Hall, Oxford

David Rutherford Priestland is a British historian. He is Professor of Modern History at the University of Oxford and a Fellow of St Edmund Hall. He has served as the college's vice-principal since April 2023.

== Career ==
Priestland completed his undergraduate and doctoral studies at the University of Oxford. He was elected to a junior research fellowship at St Edmund Hall and a Darby fellowship at Lincoln College before becoming a tutorial fellow at St Edmund Hall in 1992 following the retirement of H. E. J. Cowdrey.

Priestland's research focuses on the history of the Soviet Union and the development of communism and neoliberalism. He is an occasional political and cultural commentator for The Guardian and New Statesman. His main works include a global history of communism, The Red Flag, a history of Stalinism in the USSR, and a historical sociological essay on modern global history focusing on neoliberalism and global capitalism, "Merchant, Soldier, Sage: A New History of Power", which focuses mainly on a power struggle between three "castes", or socio-cultural groups, fighting for domination within society. Priestland's main argument is that humanity has shifted from societies oriented towards a warrior-class, through periods of sage dominance into a modern hegemony of merchants, which has culminated in dominance by businesspeople and entrepreneurs. In the book, Priestland's voice is mostly critical of global capitalism, which has attracted some notable criticism from other academics. However, Richard J. Evans, former Regius Professor of History at Cambridge, comments in The Guardian that "among the many contributions to the dissection of our current predicament, this is surely one of the most-thought provoking".

== Selected works ==
- Stalinism and The Politics of Mobilization: Ideas, Power, and Terror in Inter-War Russia. Oxford: Oxford University Press, 2007
- The Red Flag. Allen Lane 2009, ISBN 978-0-71399-481-0 (The three English-language editions 2009-2010 each have different subtitles: How Communism Changed The World; Communism and the Making of the Modern World; A History of Communism)
  - World History of Communism. From the French Revolution to today. Translated by Klaus-Dieter Schmidt. Siedler, Munich 2009, ISBN 978-3-88680-708-6
  - World History of Communism. Federal Agency for Civic Education, Bonn ISBN 978-3-8389-0055-1.
  - Russian edition: Красный флаг . история коммунизма, Krasnyi flag: Istorija kommunizma, ЭКСМО / EKSMO, Moskva 2011
- Merchant, Soldier, Sage. A New History of Power. London: Allen Lane, 2012
- Merchant, soldier, sage: a history of the world in three castes. New York: Penguin Press, 2013
