= Björn Kumm =

Swedish journalist and author (born 1938)

Björn Kumm (born 1938) is a Swedish journalist and author. He has written books on Latin America, the Cold War, and the history of terrorism. In 1967, as a young journalist Kumm was one of the few people to see the dead body of Che Guevara, after the execution of the captured revolutionary leader by Bolivian troops. Kumm described the scene in a November 11, 1967, exclusive for The New Republic.

In 2007, Kumm wrote a biography on Guevara called Che.
