= Harry Villegas =

Cuban communist guerilla (1940–2019)

- Born: 10 May 1940; Yara, Cuba
- Died: 29 December 2019 (aged 79); Havana, Cuba
- Military career
- Allegiance: Communist Party of Cuba; Cuba's National Assembly; Association of Combatants of the Cuban Revolution

Harry Villegas (10 May 1940 – 29 December 2019) was a Cuban communist guerrilla. He was born in Yara and was a descendant of African slaves. He fought alongside Che Guevara in battles from the Sierra Maestra to the Bolivian insurgency. From 1977 to 1979, and again from 1981 to 1988, Villegas was part of the leadership of Cuba's volunteer military mission in Angola, fighting alongside Angolan and Namibian forces against aggression by South Africa's apartheid regime. Villegas was a Central Committee member of the Communist Party of Cuba from 1997 to 2011, a deputy of Cuba's National Assembly, and executive vice president of the Association of Combatants of the Cuban Revolution.

Villegas was also a published writer. He died aged 79 in Havana.

== Books in English ==
- Pombo: A Man of Che's guerrilla. With Che Guevara in Bolivia, 1966-68 Pathfinder Press (1997).
- At the Side of Che Guevara: Interviews With Harry Villegas Pathfinder Press (1997).
- Cuba and Angola The War for Freedom Pathfinder Press (2017).
