= Che Jesus =

Christian advertising image

The 1999 Che Jesus poster

Che Jesus is an image depicting Jesus Christ in the style of Jim Fitzpatrick's iconic two-tone portrait of Che Guevara, which is itself based upon Alberto Korda's iconic Guerrillero Heroico photo.

== Background ==
The image was created by Chas Bayfield, Martin Casson and Trevor Webb for the Churches Advertising Network (CAN) in the UK, who used it to encourage church attendance for Easter 1999. The poster used the slogan: 'Meek. Mild. As If. Discover the real Jesus. Church. April 4.' 50,000 leaflets were distributed to churches across the UK and posters were put up at bus shelters, railway stations and hoardings.

The artwork for the poster was created by photocopying a painting of Christ on to acetate and laying this over a copy of Korda's photo. By tracing over the two faces, a composite face was created. This was then traced again and inked in to create a black and white copy. This was scanned in to an Apple Macintosh, the background changed to red and the type added by Matt McMullen.

The launch of the Che Jesus image became international news and it later appeared in the 2000 exhibition Seeing Salvation in London's National Gallery, was featured in the Faith Zone in the Millennium Dome, and appeared in the 2006 Che Guevara: Revolutionary and Icon exhibition at the V&A Museum.

== Controversy ==
The image was met with anger by conservative church members and some politicians who condemned the marketing strategy as blasphemous for using a "violent Communist and atheist" to promote Jesus. Tory MP Ann Widdecombe, who converted from the Church of England to Roman Catholicism some years previously, said: "We should be modelling ourselves on Christ, not modelling Christ on us." Former Tory MP Harry Greenway, sponsor of the Conservative Christian Fellowship, described the poster as "grossly sacrilegious" and demanded that those responsible for it should be excommunicated. He threatened to protest to the Archbishop of Canterbury, Dr George Carey, in the "strongest possible language". American commentator George Will dismissed the campaign as "symptomatic of a silliness that respects no borders".

The Bishop of Ely, the Right Reverend Stephen Sykes, defended the campaign and rejected accusations that it was blasphemous. He said: "The intention of the advertisement is to cause remark," he said. "It has been successful." He added: "While an analogy is implicitly drawn between the revolution of a political leader and that of Jesus, it is not said or implied that Jesus was a political revolutionary or would have endorsed the actions of Che Guevara." The Reverend Tom Ambrose, a member of CAN and Director of Communications for the Diocese of Ely, said the poster was designed to make people think about Christianity. He said: "We want people to realise that Jesus is not a wimp in a white nightie or someone who is a bit of a walkover, but a strong, revolutionary figure."
