= Luis Korda =

Cuban photographer (1912–1985)

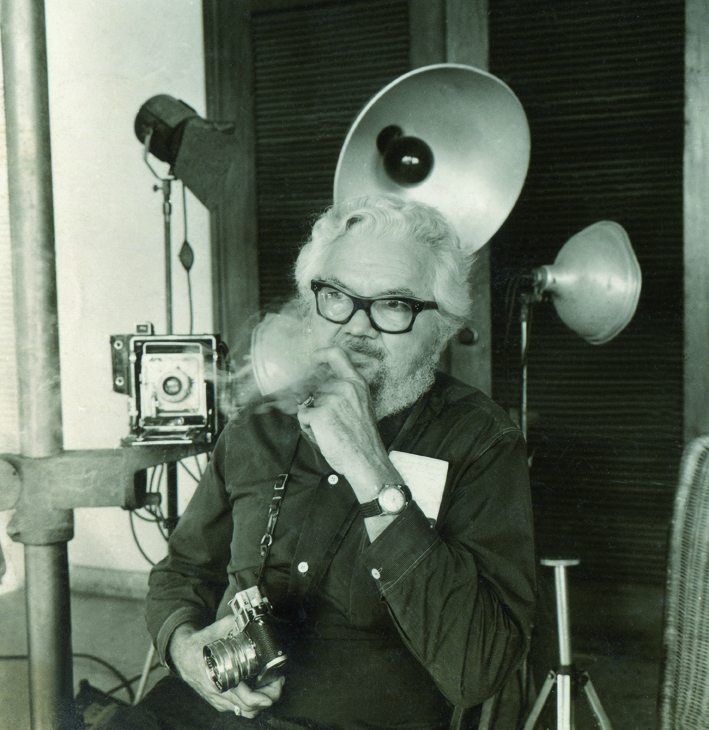
- Korda in his studio in Havana
- Born: Luis Antonio Peirce Byers; 17 January 1912; Manzanillo, Cuba
- Died: 19 December 1985 (aged 73); Havana, Cuba
- Occupation: Photographer

Luis Korda, born Luis Antonio Peirce Byers and also known as Korda (17 January 1912 – 19 December 1985), was a Cuban photographer.

== Biography ==
The son of a North American miner and a Jamaican mother, Luis Antonio Peirce Byers was born in Manzanillo, Cuba. In 1956 he founded the Havana photography studio Korda Studios with Alberto Díaz Gutiérrez. The name of the company came from the famous Hungarian-British film directors Alexander and Zoltan Korda, and both photographers came to be known by the name: Luis was known as Korda the Elder (Luis Korda) and Alberto as Korda the Younger (Alberto Korda). The range of work by the company spanned fashion and traditional advertising shoots, as well as shoots for recording labels, insurance, pharmaceuticals, promotional work for Bacardi and Hatuey, car dealerships etc. Photo journalism was also part of the studio’s output, reporting, for example, on the most famous Cuban motor racing event, the Carrera from Oinar del Rio via Saua la Grande to Havanna. By October 1956 the two photographers had relocated their studio to apartment 2, on the first floor of a building just opposite the emerging Hotel Capri on Calle 21 (No. 15, entre N y O) in Vedado and a few weeks later they changed the name of the company to Studios Korda.

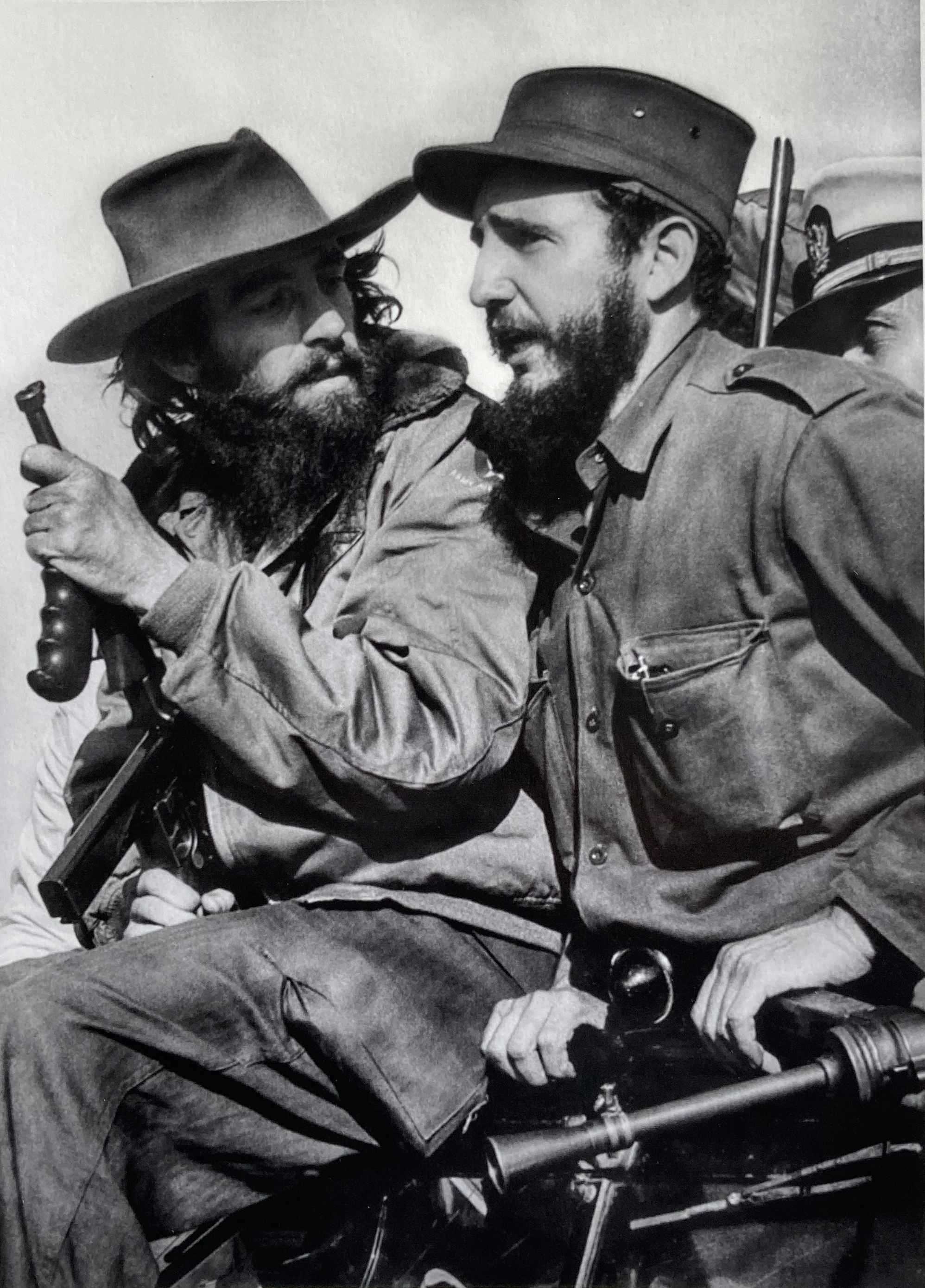
Luis Korda's most important image: Fidel Castro and Camilo Cienfuegos in Havana, January 8, 1959

The members of the Korda Studios community distinguished themselves through the variety of the commissions and reporting taken on by the individual artists, a fact demonstrated by the neutral but ever-changing studio stamp which appears on the back of each of the prints. Luis was a distinguished photographer, and above all was very technically gifted. However, he was not a gifted businessman, and thus he showed no particular drive to gain commissions. It can be assumed that the majority of the output of the studio came from his partner, Alberto. Alberto Díaz acted primarily as photographer and travel companion of Fidel Castro, with whom he had a close relationship, and also Ernesto Guevara, whom he saw as rather arrogant – a personal view he shared with many other photographers.

Luis Korda’s most famous image is also the most important photo of the Cuban revolution, showing the revolutionaries entering Havana on 8 January 1959 with Fidel Castro and Camilo Cienfuegos at the head of the procession.

The fear that Studio Korda, a privately held company, could fall victim to nationalisation, drove Alberto Diaz and Luis Peirce to bequeath it to the Oficina de Asuntos Historicos in November 1966 (lead at the time by Celia Sanchez), along with any negatives relating to the Revolution. Yet two years later, on 14 March 1968, in the absence of the two Kordas, the company was officially closed as part of the last wave of nationalisation; the artwork was seized and given to the Oficina de Asuntos Historicos. The majority of the commercial and fashion photographs by Alberto, Luis and their later associate Genovevo Vasquez were lost, and with them an important and hitherto little-understood chapter in the history of Cuban photography.

After the closure of Korda Studios in 1968, Luis Korda worked for the satirical weekly magazine Palante and for the weekly magazine Bohemia. He died in Havana.
