= Alberto Korda =

Cuban photographer (1928–2001)

- Korda in 1959
- Born: Alberto Díaz Gutiérrez; September 14, 1928; Havana, Republic of Cuba
- Died: May 25, 2001 (aged 72); Paris, France
- Known for: Photographer of Guerrillero Heroico

Signature
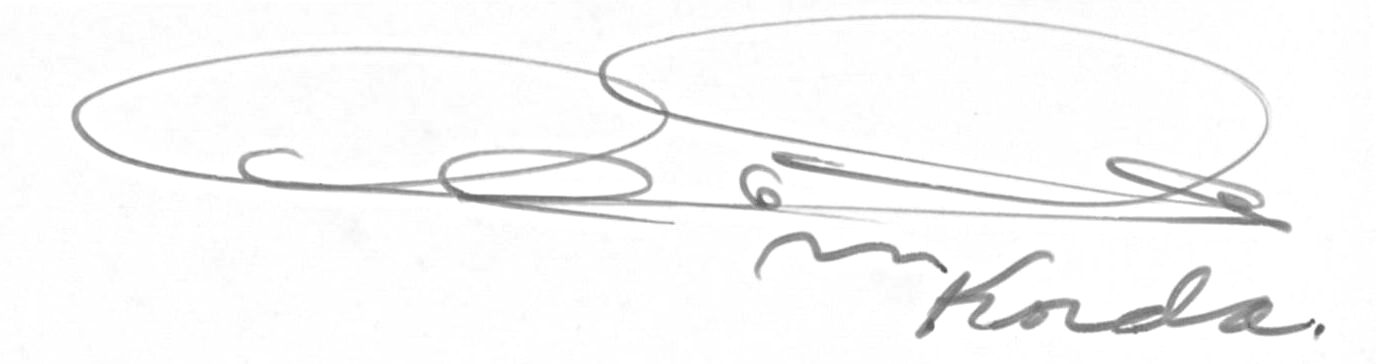

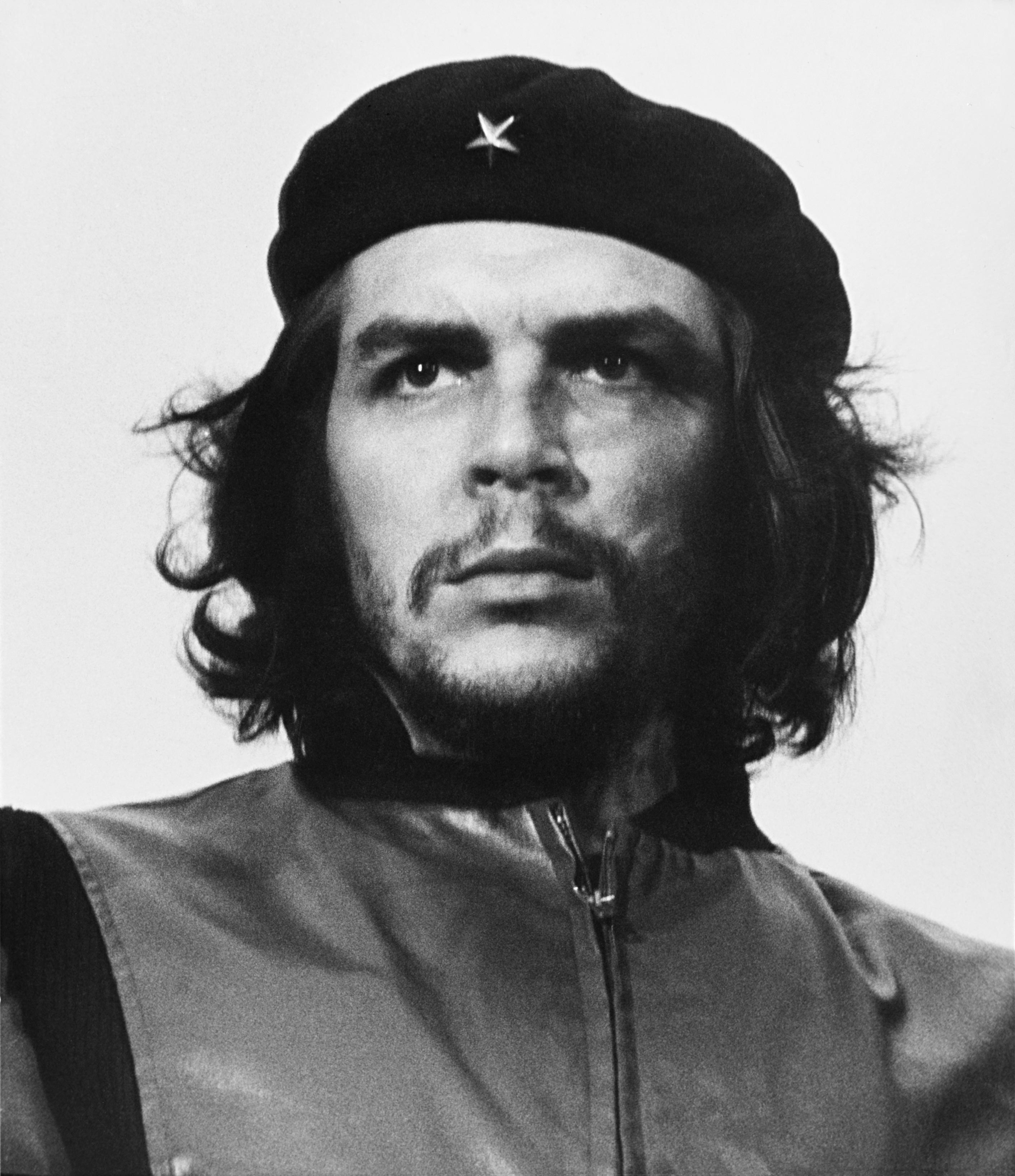
Alberto Korda: Che Guevara, Guerrillero Heroico, March 5, 1960.

Alberto Díaz Gutiérrez (September 14, 1928 – May 25, 2001), better known as Alberto Korda or simply Korda, was a Cuban photographer, remembered for his famous image Guerrillero Heroico of Argentine Marxist revolutionary Che Guevara.

== Early life ==
Korda, whose real name was Alberto Díaz Gutiérrez, was born on September 14, 1928, in Havana, Cuba. He got his first taste of photography when he took his father's Kodak 35mm and began taking pictures of his girlfriend. Korda was the son of a railway worker, and took many jobs before beginning as a photographer's assistant. Korda began his career as a photographer who shot pictures at banquets, baptisms and weddings. He would run back to his studio to develop the film, then return to the event and sell his photographs as souvenirs. The quality of Korda's work as a beginner was very poor; after a few months the image became blurry and the paper yellowed. When he opened his first studio, Korda had an opportunity to learn from his mistakes and to stop the yellowing process by using the right chemicals for the correct durations of time. In 1956 he founded the Havana photography studio Korda Studios with Luis Antonio Peirce Byers. The name of the company came from the famous Hungarian-British film directors Alexander and Zoltan Korda, and both photographers came to be known by the name: Luis was known as Korda the Elder (Luis Korda) and Alberto as Korda the Younger. Initially, the Kordas took a variety of jobs ranging from fashion to advertisements.

Most of the jobs were photographed by his studio partner, to keep their business going. It was the money generated by these jobs that allowed Korda to develop his unique style of looking at an image from another angle, different from the traditional photographers' studios. It was this style that Studios Korda quickly became identified with achieving. In the early years, Korda was most interested in fashion because it allowed him to pursue his two favorite things, photography and beautiful women. Korda became Cuba's premiere fashion photographer.

Korda disliked artificial lighting; he said it was "a travesty of reality" and only used natural light in his studio. He was master of black-and-white photography who looked for perfect composition and framing. Korda had unique creative ambition that he used to rise above in style when compared to the unimaginative cultural perspective of traditional Cuban photography. This unique creativity turned the Korda Studio into something more than just a prosperous business; it became an art studio. "My main aim was to meet women", he once confessed. His second wife, Natalia (Norka) Menéndez, was a well known Cuban fashion model.

== Cuban Revolution ==
The relationship between Fidel Castro and Korda could not be defined by one label or title. For Castro, Korda was more than an official photographer, a friend or personal photographer. They never discussed salary or title, their relationship wasn't boss and worker. Korda was very relaxed, and interested in everything and everyone. For him, every photo he took was a symbol of the revolution, instead of a documentary of the events of the revolution. The Cuban Revolution was the turning point in Korda's career; his career plans were completely changed with the success of the revolutionaries. In 1959 the newly established newspaper offered the largest space for photographers to display their photographs, and Korda became part of the revolutionary cause. Korda Says, "Nearing 30, I was heading toward a frivolous life when an exceptional event transformed my life: The Cuban Revolution. It was at this time that I took this photo of a little girl, who was clutching a piece of wood for a doll. I came to understand that it was worth dedicating my work to a revolution which aimed to remove these inequalities." He got caught up in the ideals of the revolution and began photographing its leaders. As photographer of the Revolution, Korda always worked at his own photographic tempo; he wasn't pushed by the press or by any other requests. Wherever the revolution took Castro, Korda followed. One of Korda's most recognizable images was of Castro's visit to the Lincoln Memorial in Washington, D.C., in April 1959. Castro's travels took Korda all around Cuba, overseas, and the Soviet Union. In 1963 photos of Fidel and Nikita Khrushchev, taken by Korda, illustrated the differences in both men that were evident in their respective politics.

In 1959 Fidel went back to the Sierra Maestra, the remote mountain region, where the revolutionary army began its attacks on the army of the Batista Regime. Korda's style was to move to the front of whatever group Fidel was leading to get the shots he wanted. When Korda came back to his home, his daughter barely recognized him: his hair and beard were long and he hadn't showered for months. Korda took many pictures for the newspaper and called the series "Fidel Returns to the Sierra." Fidel always liked Korda's photos and never stopped him when he attempted to take his picture. He worked freely without thinking about political consequences to get what he wanted in his photos.

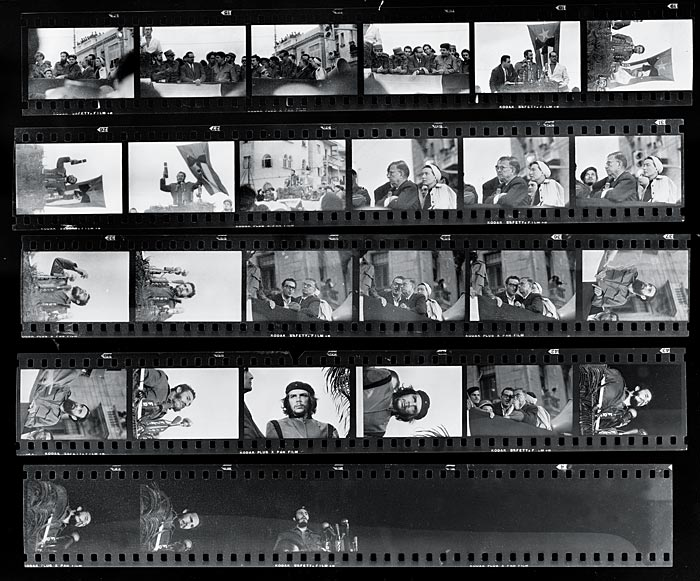
Korda's film roll from March 5, 1960, when he took his famous Guerrillero Heroico photo of Che Guevara. Philosophers Jean-Paul Sartre and Simone de Beauvoir are also pictured, along with Fidel Castro.

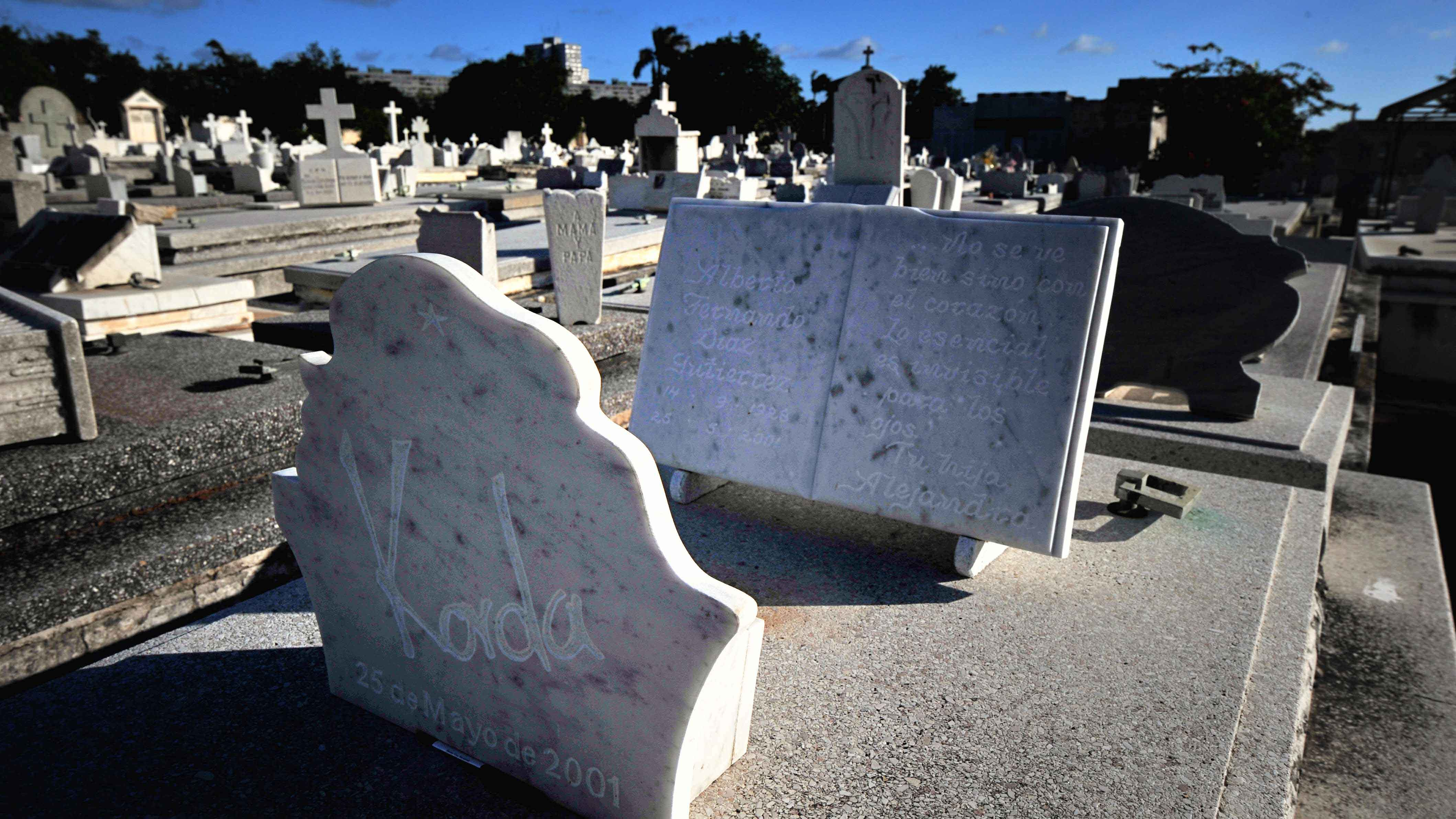
Gravesite of Alberto Korda

Korda was a photographer for the Cuban newspaper Revolución when he produced on March 5, 1960, the iconic image of Che Guevara that became a worldwide symbol of revolution and rebellion. He never received any royalties for the image, because Castro did not recognize the Berne Convention for the Protection of Literary and Artistic Works. In 2000, he sued Smirnoff (Lowe Lintas) over the use of the image in advertisement. Commenting on the illicit use of his photograph, the artist said, "As a supporter of the ideals for which Che Guevara died, I am not averse to its reproduction by those who wish to propagate his memory and the cause of social justice throughout the world, but I am categorically against the exploitation of Che's image for the promotion of products such as alcohol, or for any purpose that denigrates the reputation of Che." His out-of-court settlement of US $50,000 was donated to the Cuban healthcare system. He said, "If Che were still alive, he would have done the same." However, he told a BBC World Service reporter that he did approve of the 1999 Che Jesus adaptation of the image used by the Churches Advertising Network to promote church attendance in the UK. The truth is that Korda gave the picture for free to Giangiacomo Feltrinelli, an Italian publisher who had published Doctor Zhivago and went on to publish Castro's diaries.

After the revolution, Korda became Fidel Castro's personal photographer for 10 years, accompanying Castro on trips and in meetings with foreign personalities. During this time he also took pictures of demonstrations, sugar cane harvests and factory scenes. Other less-known Fidel Castro images by Korda include shots of Castro staring warily at a tiger in a New York zoo, playing golf and fishing with Che Guevara, skiing and hunting in Russia, and with Ernest Hemingway. Korda's work also includes pictures of Castro's rebels riding into Havana after their triumph, and one known as The Quixote of the Lamp Post showing a Cuban wearing a straw hat and sitting on a lamp post against a sea of people during a rally.

== Later life and death ==
From 1968 to 1978 he concentrated on underwater photography until a Japanese exhibition in 1978 stimulated international interest in his work. He appeared briefly in the pre-title sequence of Wim Wenders' film Buena Vista Social Club in 1999, although he was uncredited.

Korda suffered a fatal heart attack in Paris in 2001 while presenting an exhibition of his work. He is buried in the Colon Cemetery, Havana.

He was featured in a full feature documentary titled Kordavision directed by Hector Cruz Sandoval in 2006 which was selected by AMPAS 2007 documentary series.

In September 2016 the Leica camera that Korda used for his famous photograph of Che Guevara was auctioned through the online auction house Catawiki for €18,100.

== Korda's Family lawsuit against Bruce Labruce's The Raspberry Reich ==
In 2005 Bruce Labruce's producer Jürgen Brüning and Labruce himself were sued by the estate of Korda for a million dollars over the use of Korda's famous photo of Che "Guerrillero Heroico" in Labruce's movie The Raspberry Reich.

In an interview from 2018 the Canadian filmmaker talked about the lawsuit:

It played at over a hundred film festivals and was on its way to becoming a cult hit when, about six months into my tour with the film, Jurgen and I got hit with a million dollar (Canadian) lawsuit for copyright infringement by the Korda estate.

The lawsuit was launched in France, which has some of the toughest copyright laws in the world, but the sixty-page court document was delivered to my door in Toronto by a local sheriff, so it was pretty heavy. We got a famous gay French lawyer, Emmanuel Pierrat, to defend us, but we technically lost. The damages were reduced to about €8,000, but we had to cover the court costs, so we ended up having to pay about €30,000 (the budget of the film was about 60,000!), effectively erasing all our profits from the film.

'The film is a critique of radical chic and both a critique and celebration of the radical left, but it is obviously anti-capitalist, so the irony of being scuttled by Che and Korda over copyright was bitter.

They argued mostly that we "demeaned" and "defiled" the image of Che, although I didn't really intend having a hot porn star jerk off on a blow-up of the Che image to be demeaning at all – more of an homage, really. I just figured everyone else in the world was jerking off to the image, so I might as well show it literally.

The film's slogans, particularly "The Revolution is My Boyfriend," started to be widely quoted online and on t-shirts and banners, neatly mirroring the radical chic critiqued in the movie.

Excerpt from Make Porn, Not War: An Interview With Bruce LaBruce.

== Notable photos by Korda ==
- La Niña de la Muñeca de Palo (1958)
- Entrada de Fidel a La Habana (1959)
- El Quijote de la farola (1959)
- Fidel in Washington (1959)
- Guerrillero Heroico (1960)
- Miliciana (1962)

== Exhibitions ==
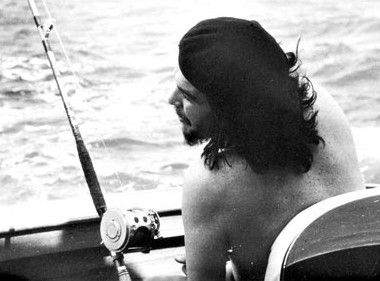
In March 2010, an original proof of this 1960 Korda photo of Che Guevara fishing with Fidel Castro, sold at auction for £ 6,600.

"Forget the camera, forget the lens, forget all of that. With any four-dollar camera, you can capture the best picture."

— Alberto Korda's advice to aspiring photographers

Solo exhibitions of his works have been held in Helsinki, Finland, 1962; the Galleria H. Diafragma Canon, Milan, Italy, 1985; Galería Servando Cabrera, Havana, 1986; Roy Boyd Gallery, Chicago, 2000; COEX, Seoul, Korea, 2011.

Group exhibitions of his works include: in 1962, Museo Nacional de Bellas Artes, Havana; 1967, Expo'67, Pabellón Cubano, Montreal; 1980, Consejo Mexicano de Fotografía, Mexico City; 1980, Centro de Arte Internacional, Havana; 1983, Westbeth Gallery, New York; 1999, Centro de Desarrollo de las Artes Visuales, Havana; 2000, C. Grimaldis Gallery, Baltimore, Maryland; 2000, Royal National Theatre, London; 2002, Museum of Art, Ft. Lauderdale, Florida.

== Awards ==
He was awarded the Cuban "Palma de Plata" in 1959; named Best Photoreporter of the year, Revolución Journal, Havana, 1960–1963; awarded the 5th International Award of Submarine Photografie "Maurizio Sana," Italy; awarded National Culture Distinction, Ministry of Culture, Cuba; 1994.

== Collections ==
His works are in the collections of Casa de las Américas, Havana, Cuba; Center for Cuban Studies, New York, NY; Centro Studi e Archivio della Comunicazione, Parma University, Parma, Italy; Fototeca de Cuba, Havana, Cuba; Galleria IF, Milan, Italy; Galleria Il Diafragma Kodak, Milan, Italy; Maison de la Culture de la Seine Saint-Denis, Paris, France; Museo Nacional de Bellas Artes, Havana, Cuba.
