= Guerrillero Heroico =

1960 photograph of Che Guevara

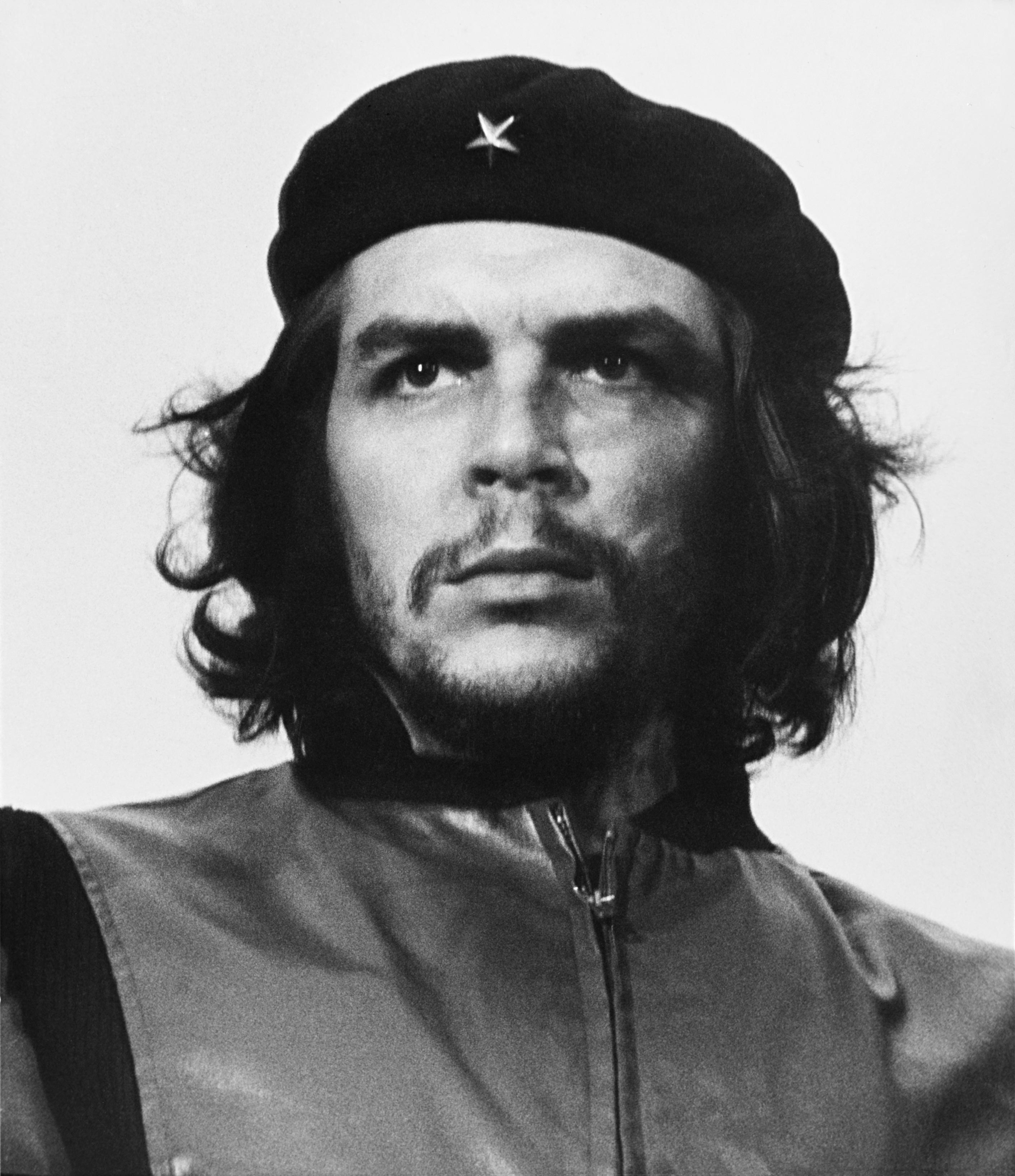
- Alberto Korda's photograph of Che Guevara
- Artist: Alberto Korda
- Completion date: 5 March 1960; 66 years ago
- Type: Photograph

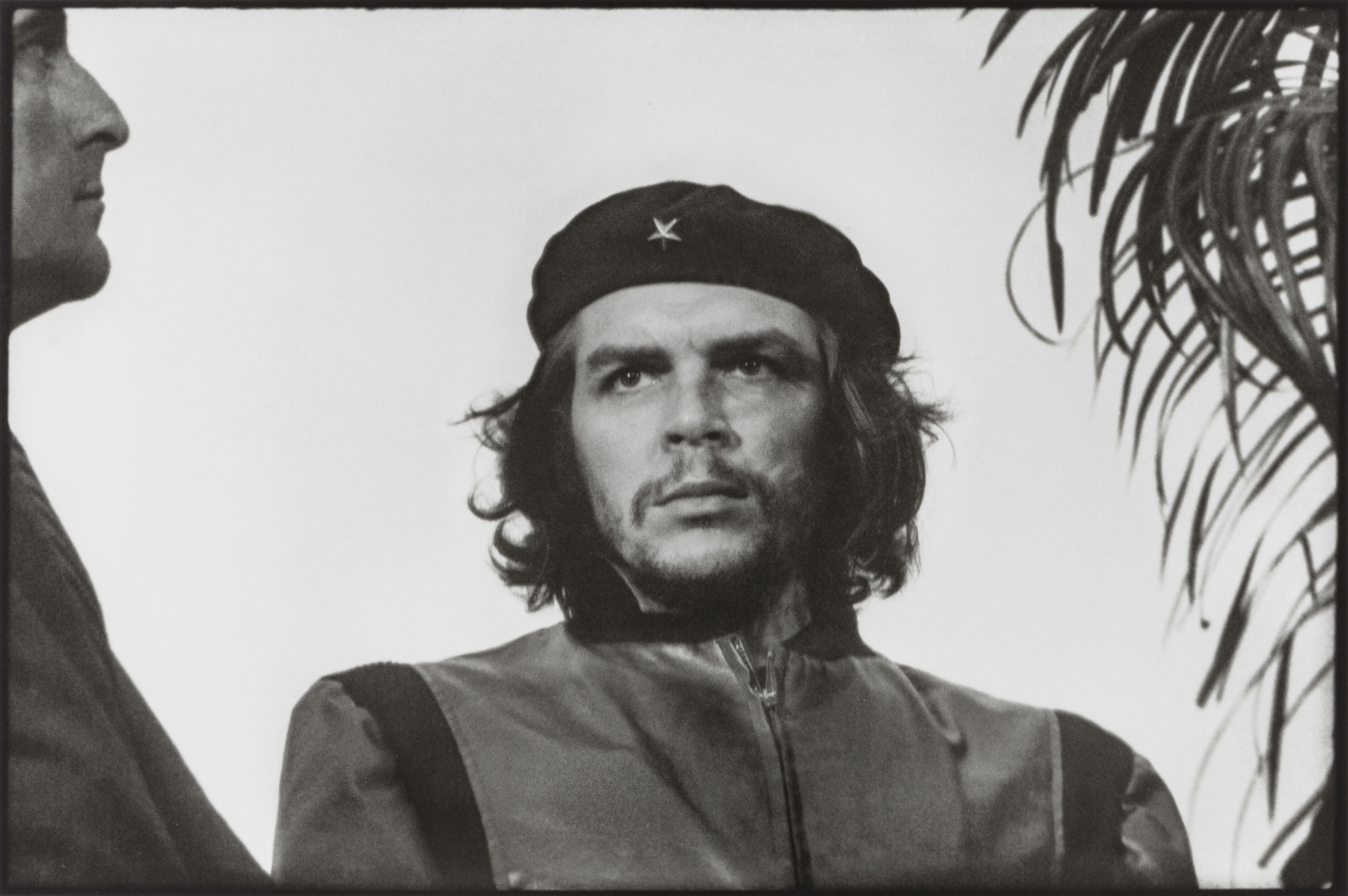
The original image, from which the popularized portrait was derived. By cropping out a palm tree and the profile of Jorge Masetti, increasing the contrast, and making other slight adjustments, Korda gave Guevara's image "an ageless quality, divorced from the specifics of time and place."

Guerrillero Heroico (Latin American Spanish: [ɡeriˈʝeɾo eˈɾojko]; "Heroic Guerrilla Fighter") is a photograph of Argentine revolutionary Che Guevara taken by Alberto Korda. It was captured on 5 March 1960, in Havana, Cuba, at a memorial service for victims of the La Coubre explosion. By the end of the 1960s, the image, in conjunction with Guevara's subsequent actions and eventual assassination, helped solidify the leader as a cultural icon. Korda has said that at the moment he shot the picture, he was drawn to Guevara's facial expression, which showed "absolute implacability" as well as anger and pain. Years later, Korda would say that the photograph showed Che's firm and stoical character. Guevara was 31 years old at the time the photograph was taken.

Emphasizing the image's ubiquitous nature and wide appeal, the Maryland Institute College of Art called the picture a symbol of the 20th century and the world's most famous photograph. Versions of it have been painted, printed, digitized, embroidered, tattooed, silk-screened, sculpted or sketched on nearly every surface imaginable, leading the Victoria and Albert Museum to say that the photograph has been reproduced more than any other image in photography. Jonathan Green, director of the UCR/California Museum of Photography, has speculated that

Korda's image has worked its way into languages around the world. It has become an alpha-numeric symbol, a hieroglyph, an instant symbol. It mysteriously reappears whenever there's a conflict. There isn't anything else in history that serves in this way.

The history and contemporary global impact of the image is the basis for the 2008 documentary Chevolution, directed by Trisha Ziff, along with the 2009 book Che's Afterlife: The Legacy of an Image by Michael Casey.

== Origins ==
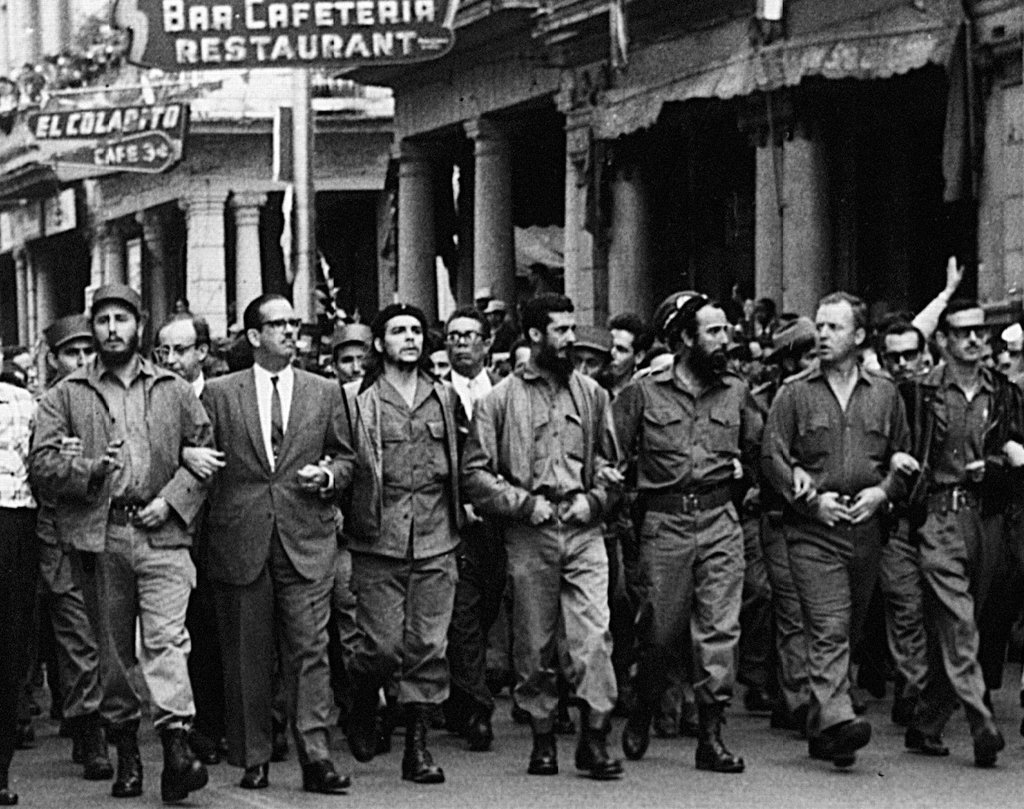
Che Guevara (third from left) and Fidel Castro (far left) marching to Colón Cemetery.

On 4 March 1960, the French freighter La Coubre exploded in Havana Harbor, killing up to 100 people and injuring several hundred more. Upon hearing the blast, Guevara rushed to the harbor to board the burning ship, angrily forcing his way past those concerned for his safety following a secondary explosion.

The following day on 5 March, President Fidel Castro blamed the U.S. CIA and called for a memorial service and mass demonstration at Havana's Colón Cemetery, to honor the victims. At the time, Guevara was Minister of Industry in the new government, and Korda was Castro's official photographer. After a funeral march along the seafront boulevard known as Malecón, Fidel Castro gave a eulogy for the fallen at a stage on the corner of 23rd and 12th streets. Castro gave a fiery speech, using the words "Patria o Muerte" ("Homeland or Death") for the first time.

Meanwhile, at 11:20 am, Guevara came into view for a few seconds, wearing a jacket and a black beret with an inverted five-pointed brass star. Korda snapped just two frames of him from a distance of about 25–30 ft (7.6–9.1 m) before he disappeared from sight. Korda immediately realised his photograph had the attributes of a portrait. Later, Korda said of this photograph, "I remember it as if it were today … seeing him framed in the viewfinder, with that expression. I am still startled by the impact … it shakes me so powerfully".

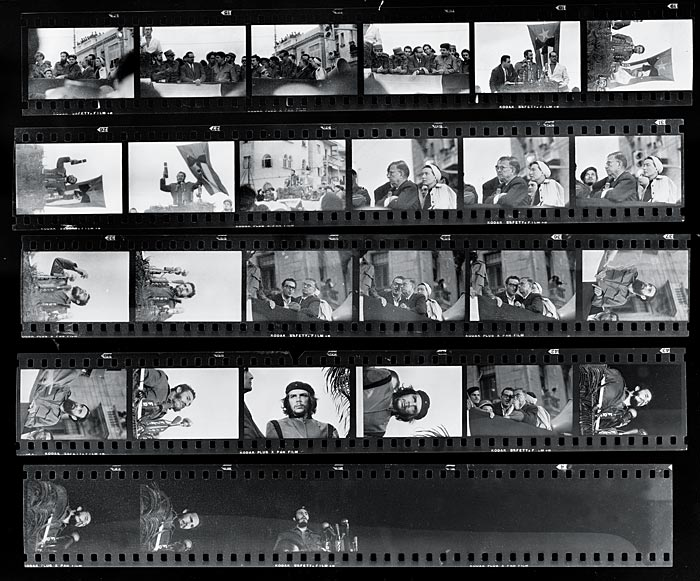
Korda's film contact sheet. Guerrillero Heroico appears on the fourth row down, third picture over (shot horizontally).

During the rally, Korda took pictures of Cuban dignitaries and famous French existentialist philosophers Jean-Paul Sartre and Simone de Beauvoir, both admirers of Guevara at the time. Included in the film roll were shots of all the speakers and two pictures of Che's brief appearance. The classic picture appears on frame number 40 shot horizontally.

The first photograph had Guevara framed alone between the silhouette of Jorge Masetti and a palm tree; the second with someone's head appearing above his shoulder. The first picture, with the intruding material cropped out and the image rotated slightly, became Guevara's most famous portrait. The editor of Revolución where Korda worked, decided to use only his shots of Castro, Sartre, and de Beauvoir, while sending the Che shot back to Korda. Believing the image was powerful, Korda made a cropped version for himself, which he enlarged and hung on his wall next to a portrait of the Chilean poet Pablo Neruda, and also gave copies to some others as a gift. It was not until 1986 that José Figueroa, an established photographer in his own right who printed for Korda and was his unofficially "adopted" son, suggested they try printing the full frame version of the portrait. Korda continued to print both versions of the image up until his death.

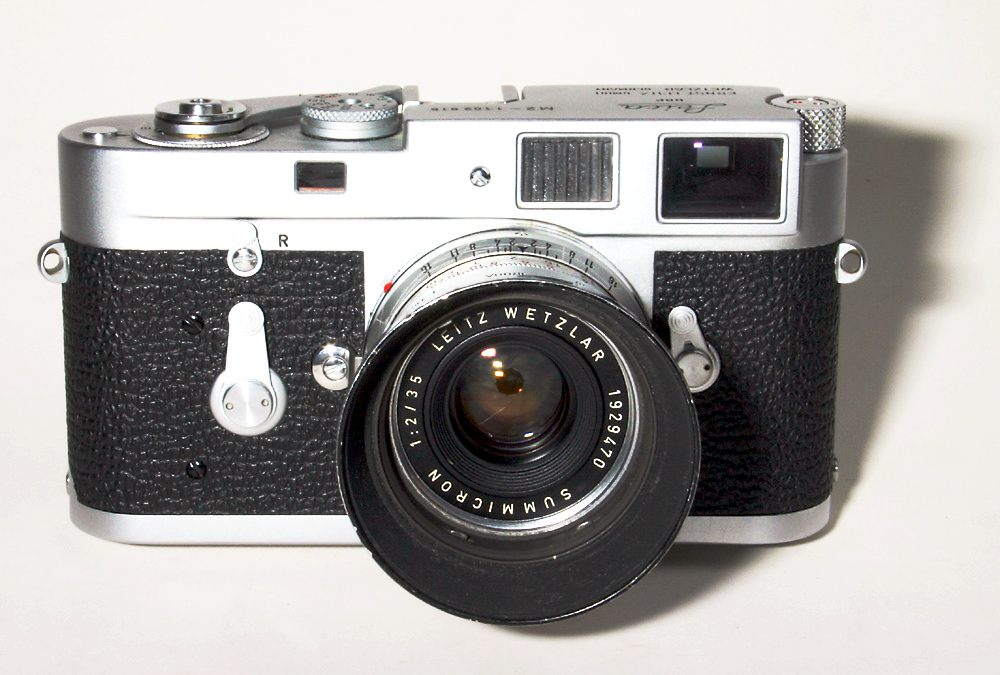
Leica M2, similar to the one the photograph was taken on

To take the photograph, Korda used a Leica M2 with a 90 mm lens, loaded with Kodak Plus-X pan film. In speaking about the method, Korda remarked that "this photograph is not the product of knowledge or technique. It was really coincidence, pure luck."

== Alberto Korda ==
As a lifelong communist and supporter of the Cuban Revolution until his death, Alberto Korda claimed no payment for his picture. A modified version of the portrait through the decades was also reproduced on a range of different media, though Korda never asked for royalties. Korda reasoned that Che's image represented his revolutionary ideals, and thus the more his picture spread the greater the chance Che's ideals would spread as well. Korda's refusal to seek royalties for the vast circulation of his photograph "helped it become the ultimate symbol of Marxist revolution and anti-imperialist struggle."

However, Korda did not want commercialization of the image in relation to products he believed Guevara would not support, especially alcohol. This belief was displayed for the first time in 2000, when in response to Smirnoff using Che's picture in a vodka commercial, Korda claimed his moral rights (a form of copyright law) and sued advertising agency Lowe Lintas and Rex Features, the company that supplied the photograph. Lintas and Rex claimed that the image was in the public domain. The final result was an out-of-court settlement for US$50,000, which Korda donated to the Cuban healthcare system, saying, "If Che was still alive, he would have done the same."

After the settlement, Korda reiterated that he was not against its propagation altogether, telling reporters:

As a supporter of the ideals for which Che Guevara died, I am not averse to its reproduction by those who wish to propagate his memory and the cause of social justice throughout the world, but I am categorically against the exploitation of Che's image for the promotion of products such as alcohol, or for any purpose that denigrates the reputation of Che.

== Use in Cuba ==
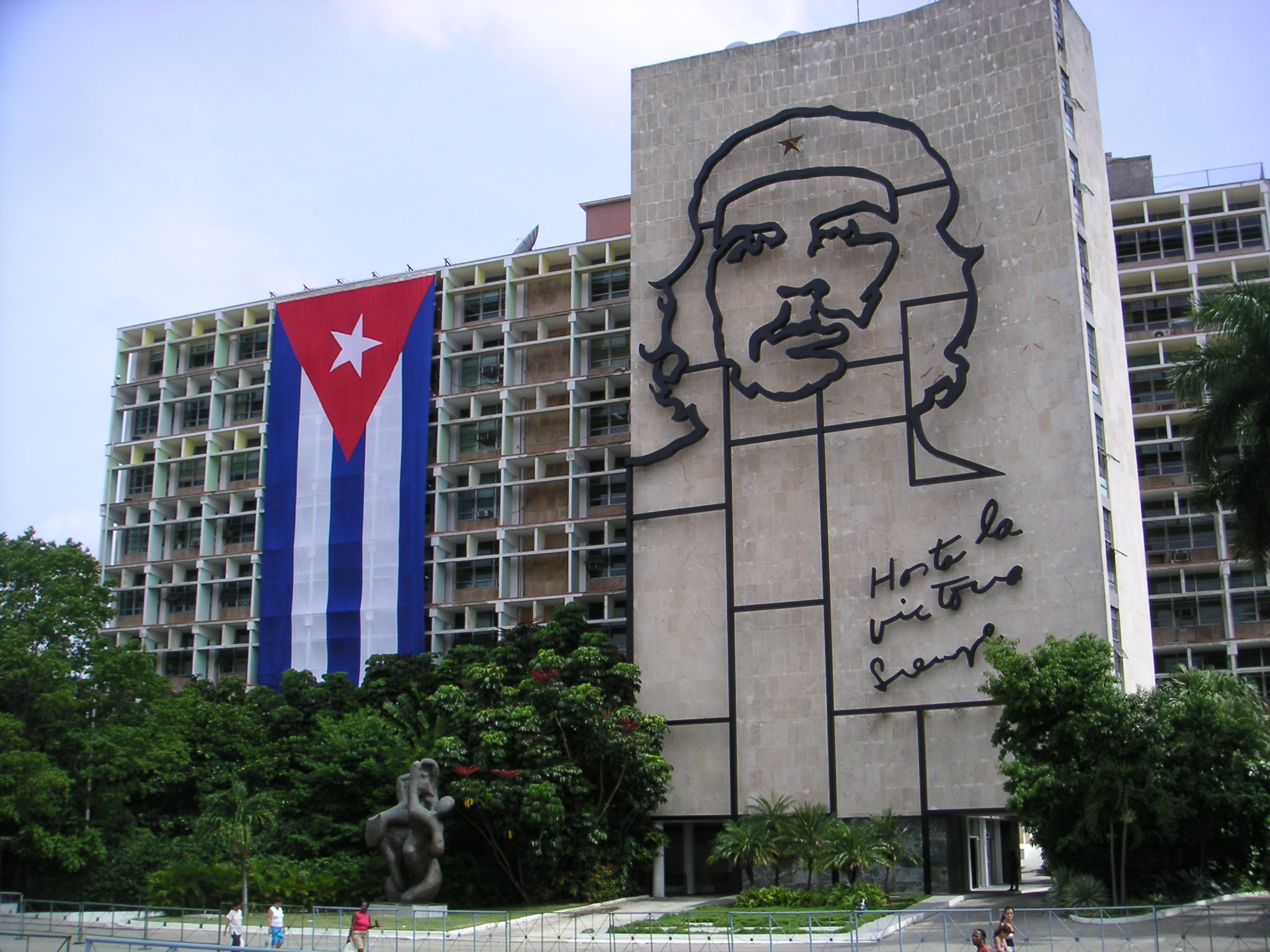
Plaza de la Revolución – in Havana, Cuba

Cuban historian Edmundo Desnoes has stated that "Che's image may be cast aside, bought and sold and deified, but it will form a part of the universal system of the revolutionary struggle, and can recover its original meaning at any moment." That meaning's origin harkens back to when Korda's photograph was first published on 16 April 1961, in the daily Cuban newspaper Revolución, advertising a noon conference during which the main speaker was "Dr. Ernesto 'Che' Guevara". The conference was disrupted when 1,300 CIA-supported counter-revolutionaries stormed the beaches of Cuba, in what became known as the failed Bay of Pigs invasion. The image was thus republished a second time advertising the newly convened conference on April 28, 1961. Che, who died six years later, could have seen the photograph that would contribute to his iconic status.

The first time Cubans on a large scale became familiar with the photograph, despite its earlier reproduction in Revolución, was upon Che's death in 1967. Upon the news of Che's execution, it was enlarged and draped on a banner down the five-story building of the Ministry of the Interior in the Plaza de la Revolución in Havana. This building where Che himself had formerly worked served as a backdrop to Fidel's eulogy on October 18, 1967, publicly acknowledging the death of Che Guevara before a crowd of more than a million mourners. José Gómez Fresquet, renowned Cuban poster maker and graphic artist, recalls how on hearing the news of Guevara's death, he immediately worked all night producing the poster to be used at the rally honoring him the next day. Korda had given Fresquet a copy of the portrait as a basis for the poster, which he created on red paper. This was the first privately produced Guerrillero Heroico created in Cuba. Since then the building has seen many versions of the image, and today a permanent steel outline, derived from the photograph, adorns the building. The image of Guerillero Heroico is present on both the banknote and coin designs for three Cuban pesos.

== International dissemination ==
=== Giangiacomo Feltrinelli ===
Che's image remained little known for seven years, although it was published in a few small Cuban publications and Korda gave copies to the occasional friend. In 1967, a print was sold or given to Giangiacomo Feltrinelli, a wealthy Italian publisher and intellectual. Feltrinelli had just returned from Bolivia, where he had hoped to help negotiate the release of French journalist and professor Régis Debray. Debray had been arrested in Bolivia in connection with guerrilla operations led by Che Guevara. As Guevara's eventual capture or death appeared to be imminent with the CIA closing in on his whereabouts, Feltrinelli acquired the rights to publish Che's captured Bolivian Diary. Feltrinelli asked Cuban officials where to obtain Guevara images and was directed to Korda's studio, where he presented a letter of introduction from the government. The document asked for Korda's assistance in finding a good portrait of Che. Korda pointed to the 1960 shot of Che hanging on the wall, saying that the photograph was the best of those he had taken of Che. Feltrinelli agreed and ordered two prints. When he returned the next day to pick them up Korda told him that because he was a friend of the revolution he did not have to pay.

Upon his return to Italy, Feltrinelli disseminated thousands of copies of the poster to raise awareness of Che's precarious situation and impending demise. Later in 1967, after Che's 9 October 1967 execution, his Bolivian Diary with Korda's photograph on the cover was released worldwide. Feltrinelli also created posters to promote the book, crediting copyright to © Libreria Feltrinelli 1967 (in the lower left hand corner of the image) with no mention of Korda. By this time, Korda's image had officially entered the public consciousness. Korda later said that if Feltrinelli had paid him just one lira for each reproduction, that he would have received millions. But Korda also said that he forgave him, because through his actions, the image became famous.

=== Milan 1967 ===
Feltrinelli's version of the image was used in October 1967 in Milan, Italy, when spontaneous protests occurred in response to the news of Che's death. Italian photographer Giorgio Mondolfo later stated that "the first time I saw the picture by Alberto Korda, I was not even slightly interested in the author. I was only fifteen, and it was the picture that had drawn us – many for the first time – to gather in the streets, crying Che lives!"

=== Paris Match ===
Guerrillero Heroico also appeared in the August 1967 issue of Paris Match. Published only a few months before his eventual capture and execution, the issue featured a major article titled "Les Guerrilleros" by journalist Jean Lartéguy. Lartéguy wrote

At a time when Cuban revolutionaries want to create Vietnams all over the world, the Americans run the risk of finding their own Algeria in Latin America.

The article ended by asking "Where is Che Guevara?" The caption of the photograph read "The official photograph of Che Guevara; on his beret the star, the symbol of the Comandante." It is not known who provided the magazine with the image, and it was also not credited to Feltrinelli. However, with its wide circulation throughout Europe, and its status as an influential news journal, Paris Match could also be viewed as one of the original purveyors of the image.

=== Paris 1968 ===
During the May 1968 Paris student riots, which eventually shook the de Gaulle government (but did not overthrow it), organizer "Danny The Red" utilized Fitzpatrick's rendition of Che during the protests. At this time, Che's image was picked up by the Dutch anarchist group "The Provos" in Amsterdam, who focused on triggering violent responses from authorities through non-violent means.

=== Jim Fitzpatrick ===
The original 1968 stylized image created by Jim Fitzpatrick.

In 1967, Irish artist Jim Fitzpatrick was also using Korda's image as a basis for creating his own stylized posters. Fitzpatrick claims he received a copy of the photograph from the Dutch anarchist group "the Provos", who produced a magazine bearing the group's name. Fitzpatrick remembers that Provo magazine claimed the image originally came to Europe via Jean-Paul Sartre. Fitzpatrick's source of the image, then, would not have been Feltrinelli.

The first image I did of Che was psychedelic, it looks like he is in seaweed. His hair was not hair, it was shapes that I felt gave it an extra dimension. That was the image I produced for the magazine and that was done before he died and that is the important thing about that image. At first it did not print. It was considered far too strong and revolutionary. I was very inspired by Che's trip to Bolivia. He went there with the intent to overthrow the intensely corrupt government, helped by the Americans at the time, and that's where he died. I thought he was one of the greatest men who ever lived and I still do in many ways. And when he was murdered, I decided I wanted to do something about it, so I created the poster. I felt this image had to come out, or he would not be commemorated otherwise, he would go where heroes go, which is usually into anonymity.

— Jim Fitzpatrick, 2005

To create the image Fitzpatrick made a paper negative on a piece of equipment called a grant. They were then printed in one color black and one color red, and he handpainted the star in yellow. Fitzpatrick "wanted the image to breed like rabbits" and hand printed thousands of images to give away to anyone for free in London, in addition to getting friends to pass them out while encouraging others to make their own versions. He printed about a hundred copies at a time to fulfill the demand of political groups in Ireland, France, and the Netherlands who began requesting the image. A batch was also sent to Spain, where they were seized by Franco's police.

Because of the high demand, Fitzpatrick formed a poster company called Two Bear Feet and produced a variety of posters in 1967 using the Korda image. All of them were created without copyright, because Fitzpatrick wanted them to be reproduced. One of these posters would be published in the satirical magazine Private Eye. The best-known was printed on silver foil and was exhibited in an exhibition in London called "Viva Che" at the Arts Laboratory, curated by Peter Meyer. This show was originally to be held at the Lisson Gallery in 1968 and illustrates how fast the image moved from protest into the realm of fine art.

Because of Fitzpatrick's desire for the photograph to reflect something of himself, he raised Che's eyes more and added his initial, an "F", on the shoulder. It was not until the 40th anniversary of Che's death that Fitzpatrick admitted to this fact stating "I'm a bit mischievous, so I never told anyone." At this time Fitzpatrick said that "I love the picture and wherever I am in the world, if I see it, I take a photo of it. I always have a chuckle when I see that little 'F'. I know that it's mine." In November 2008, Fitzpatrick announced that he would be signing over the copyright of his Che image to the William Soler Pediatric Cardiology Hospital in Havana, Cuba. In announcing his reason for ensuring all future proceeds would go to the children's hospital, Fitzpatrick stated that "Cuba trains doctors and then sends them around the world ... I want their medical system to benefit." Additionally, Fitzpatrick publicized his desire to gift the original artwork to the archive run by Guevara's widow, Aleida March.

=== Ireland ===
Sinn Féin president Gerry Adams is interviewed in the 2008 documentary Chevolution about the famous photograph. As he speaks, the film shows a montage of Che murals in Belfast, with Adams remarking "I suppose people from my background were drawn to that image, because of what Che Guevara represented." To mark the 50th anniversary of Guevara's death the Irish postal service An Post issued a €1 stamp featuring Fitzpatrick's stylised version of the image. The initial print run of 122,000 sold out within days with An Post saying they experienced "unprecedented demand".

=== The United States and further influence ===
Guerrillero Heroico made its American debut in 1968 on New York City Subway billboards, when the image appeared in painted form by Paul Davis, for a poster advertising the February issue of Evergreen Review. Paul Davis has stated that he was "inspired by Italian paintings of martyred saints and Christ", in his romanticised version of Che.

Che is an impetuous man with burning eyes and profound intelligence who seems born to make revolution.

— Henri Cartier-Bresson, Life magazine, 1963

However, the fascination was not solely an American phenomenon. For instance, British journalist Richard Gott who met with Che Guevara several times expressed a similar view, by stating how he was "struck by his magnetic physical attraction, comparable to the aura of a rock star". In Gott's opinion "almost everyone had the same impression, and journalists were particularly susceptible". Time magazine, in an August 8, 1960, cover story after meeting with Guevara displayed this view, by remarking that Che wore "a smile of melancholy sweetness that many women find devastating".

Argentine journalist Julia Costenlos, recalls that in her view he was "blessed with a unique appeal, an incalculable enchantment that came completely naturally". Even under duress, The Times journalist Henry Brandon, who spoke with Guevara at the height of the Cuban Missile Crisis, remarked that Che possessed a "genial charm" that "might have made Charles Boyer envious".

In judging the enduring appeal of the image, Darrel Couturier, representative for Korda since 1997, has opined that it was "the image of a very dashing young man" and that in the "age of free love and flower power ... the time was ripe for a figure" or "image that could represent this great diversity in thinking and behavior the world over". According to Couturier, this "age of religious revolution", matched with Guevara's premature death, "elevated him to almost martyrdom".

== In art and culture ==
When you look closely, you can see that many iconic photographs are constructed in the same way; it is possible to copy the formula. Look at some of the most enduring images of our age … Like Che, they are shot from below against a light background, giving them a raised, Godlike quality. The angle of the shot is particularly crucial, as profiles have little impact and full frontals tend to flatten the features. The direction and intensity of the subject's gaze is also key. Che is looking past the camera, out to his vision. His line of vision has been much tinkered with by various artists, but it retains its passion even on a table mat or a screensaver. An image like this is about a sign: it's a shorthand. This particular one now stands for opposition to the establishment, freedom and revolution.

— Alison Jackson, photographer and filmmaker

As pop artists took to the image with glee, it evolved into a popular and heavily commercialized icon that often strayed far from Che's hard-line Marxist message. British pop artist Sir Peter Blake has referred to Guerrillero Heroico as "one of the great icons of the 20th century". When converted into a stark black cut-out, Korda's photograph became easy, cheap, and fast to copy using the favored material and method of the 1960s: lith film and screen painting. By the time of his death in 1967, Che was already "a legend, the romantic epitome of worldwide rebellion" and in the wake of his perceived martyrdom, Korda's photograph went viral. Rebellious young people found in it a "sense of empowerment, a crystallization of the perennial idealism of youth".

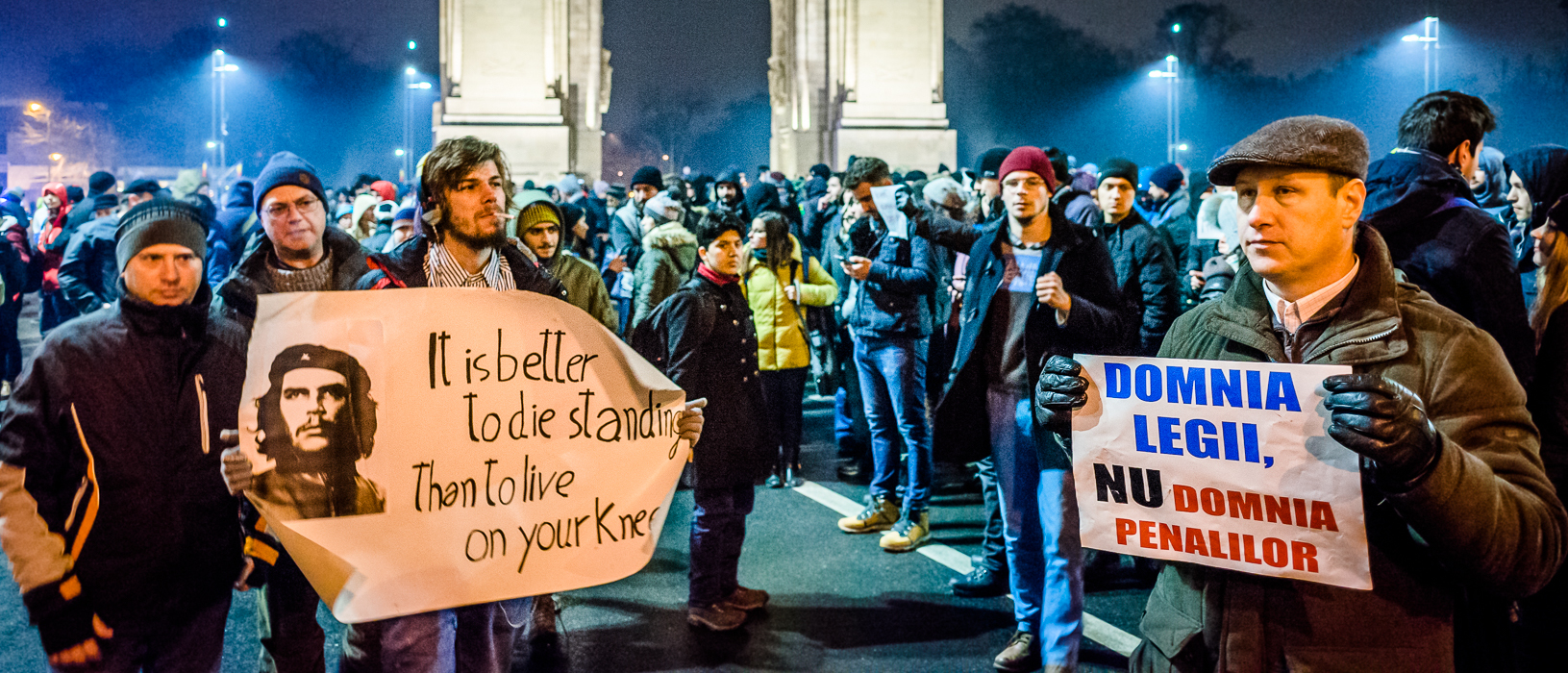
Romanian protests against government corruption in 2017

According to the V&A Museum, "the photograph enshrines Che as a mythic hero. Taken from below, the revolutionary leader with searching eyes and resolute expression becomes larger than life. A perspective that dominates the imagery of social realism, it bears an irresistible aura of authority, independence and defiance." The V&A Museum goes on to state that Korda's famous photograph first deified Che and turned him into an icon of radical chic. Its story, a complex mesh of conflicting narratives, gave Guerrillero Heroico a life of its own, an enduring fascination independent of Che himself. The Italian magazine Skime evokes even more praise, decreeing it "absolutely the most famous of history" while proclaiming that it "captures beauty and youth, courage and generosity, aesthetic and moral virtues of a person who possessed all the characteristics necessary to be converted into a symbol of an epoch like ours, lacking in historic legends and mythic incarnations." Journalist Richard Gott has also remarked that "the red star in Che's beret was up there with 'Lucy in the Sky with Diamonds'." Jonathan Green, director of the UCR photography museum, has remarked that "pop art is a rejection of traditional figuration, rhetoric, and rendition. Its egalitarian anti-art stance was the perfect corollary for Che's anti-establishment attitude."

=== Exhibits ===
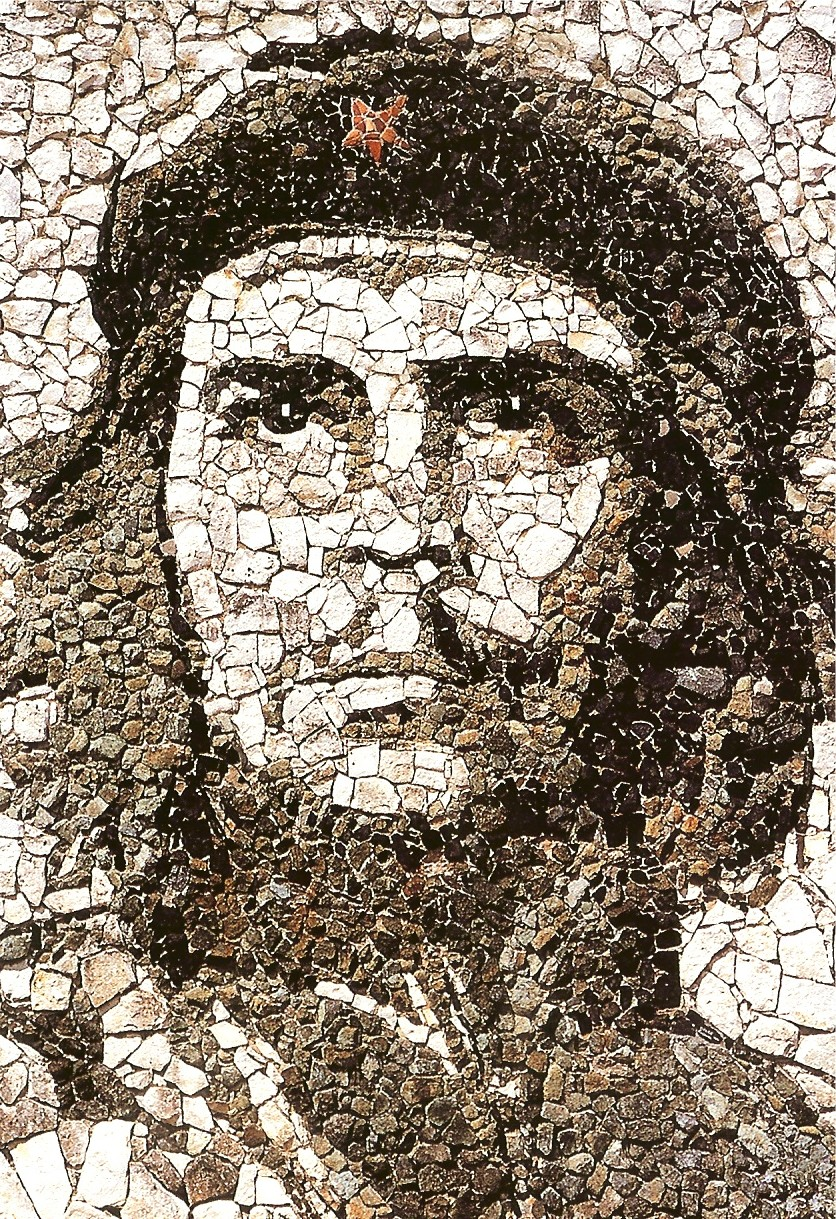
A public rock mosaic along a street in Matanzas, Cuba.

It is the image of a very dashing young man who was part of a revolution. This was a revolution of the people for the people in a time when there was a great unrest in many parts of the world, particularly in Latin America, Europe and the US. The Vietnam War was raging; students and workers were protesting and striking; it was the age of free love and flower power; it was the pop age; it was the age of religious revolution. The time was ripe for a figure, an image that could represent this great diversity in thinking and behavior the world over. Che's role in the Cuban Revolution made him a revered symbol of world class struggle, equality and freedom from domination and his premature death in 1967 elevated him to almost martyrdom.

— Darrel Couturier, Alberto Korda's agent who arranged his first U.S. exhibition in the 1998

- 1968, the Arts Laboratory in London held an exhibition on the photograph entitled "Viva Che".
- 1990, the Jour Agnes B Gallery in Paris, France, presented an exhibit of Korda's image titled "Che Guevara: A 21st Century Man".
- 1998, the UCLA Fowler Museum of Cultural History in Los Angeles, California, featured an exhibition compiled by David Kunzle titled "Che Guevara: Icon, Myth and Message".
- 2003, the Centre for Contemporary Art in Rethymnon, Greece, presented an exhibit titled "Che Guevara's Death".
- 2004, the Centro Nacional de la Música, in Buenos Aires, Argentina, held an exhibition titled "Che Guevara by the photographers of the Cuban Revolution".
- 2005, the UCR/California Museum of Photography featured an exhibition titled "Revolution and Commerce: The Legacy of Korda's Portrait of Che Guevara".
- 2005, the International Center of Photography in New York City held an exhibition titled "¡Che! Revolution and Commerce".
- 2006, the Victoria and Albert Museum in London hosted an exhibition titled "Che Guevara: Revolutionary and Icon".
- 2007, the La Triennale in Milan, Italy, featured an exhibition titled "Che Guevara Rebel and Icon: The Legacy of Korda's Portrait".
- 2007, the Tropenmuseum in Amsterdam held a special exhibition about the photograph titled "Che! A Commercial Revolution".
- 2007, the Frost Art Museum at Florida International University in Miami, Florida, presented an exhibition featuring the photograph.
- 2008, the WestLicht Gallery in Vienna, Austria, offered an exhibition on Guerrillero Heróico in relation to the "development of a mythos".
- 2008, the Fototeca center in Havana, Cuba, held an exhibition titled "Korda, Known. Unknown."
- 2008, the Santralistanbul in Istanbul, Turkey, hosted the exhibit "Narrative of a Portrait: Korda's Che from Revolution to Icon".
- 2009, the Dom Nashchokina Gallery in Moscow, hosted the exhibition "Che: Hasta Siempre! Meet You in the Eternity" from June 18 to September 20, 2009.
- 2010, the International Center of Photography in New York City, hosted the exhibition "Cuba in Revolution" from November 11 to January 9, 2011 – which featured several versions of the image.

=== Posters and covers ===
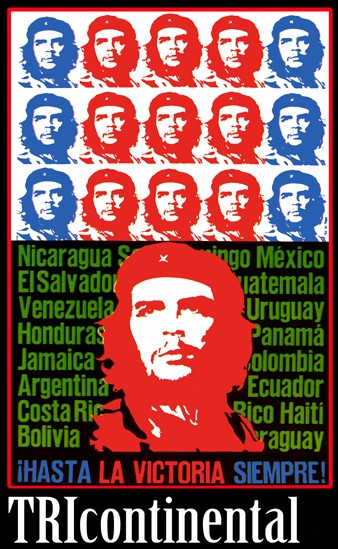
An OSPAAAL poster advertising the 1969 Tricontinental Conference.

It is the photograph that adorns student bedsits across the world. The famed black and white portrait of Ernesto "Che" Guevara perfectly captured his intense stare and brooding good looks, helping establish his myth.

— The Guardian
- In 1967 Polish artist Roman Cieslewicz designed a poster with the words "Che Si" (translation: 'Yes Che') emblazoned over his face as eyes and nose. This was later featured on the October 1967 cover of the French art magazine Opus International.
- In 1968, Elena Serrano produced a widely distributed poster titled "Day of the Heroic Guerrilla", which shows telescoping images of Korda's photograph expanding to cover the entire red map of South America.
- The 1968 February issue of Evergreen Review, featured Che's image in a painted form by Paul Davis.
- The September 1969 issue of Tricontinental Magazine featured a conjoined image of Korda's Che with Ho Chi Minh.
- During a 1969 student strike at Berkeley, a poster was produced and distributed with a cartoon bubble coming from Che's mouth possessing the words: "Shut it down!"
- In 1970, the Art Workers' Coalition produced a widely distributed anti-Vietnam War poster featuring an outline of Che on a yellow background, with his famous quotation: "Let me say at the risk of appearing ridiculous, that the true revolutionary is guided by great feelings of love."
- The Rage Against the Machine artwork for their 1993 single, "Bombtrack" features a mirrored version of the iconic two-tone portrait by Jim Fitzpatrick.
- The September 16, 1996 edition of Der Spiegel magazine titled: "The Myth of Che Guevara", featured Che's image adorned with a halo of moving bullets.
- A computerized rendition of Guerrillero Heroico appeared on the cover of the March 1–7, 2006 issue of Metro, above the title "The Blog Revolution".
- In 2003, Madonna's album American Life featured the singer redoing Guerrillero Heroico.
- The December 2008 issue of Rolling Stone Argentina features Guerrillero Heroico on the cover.

== Commodity ==
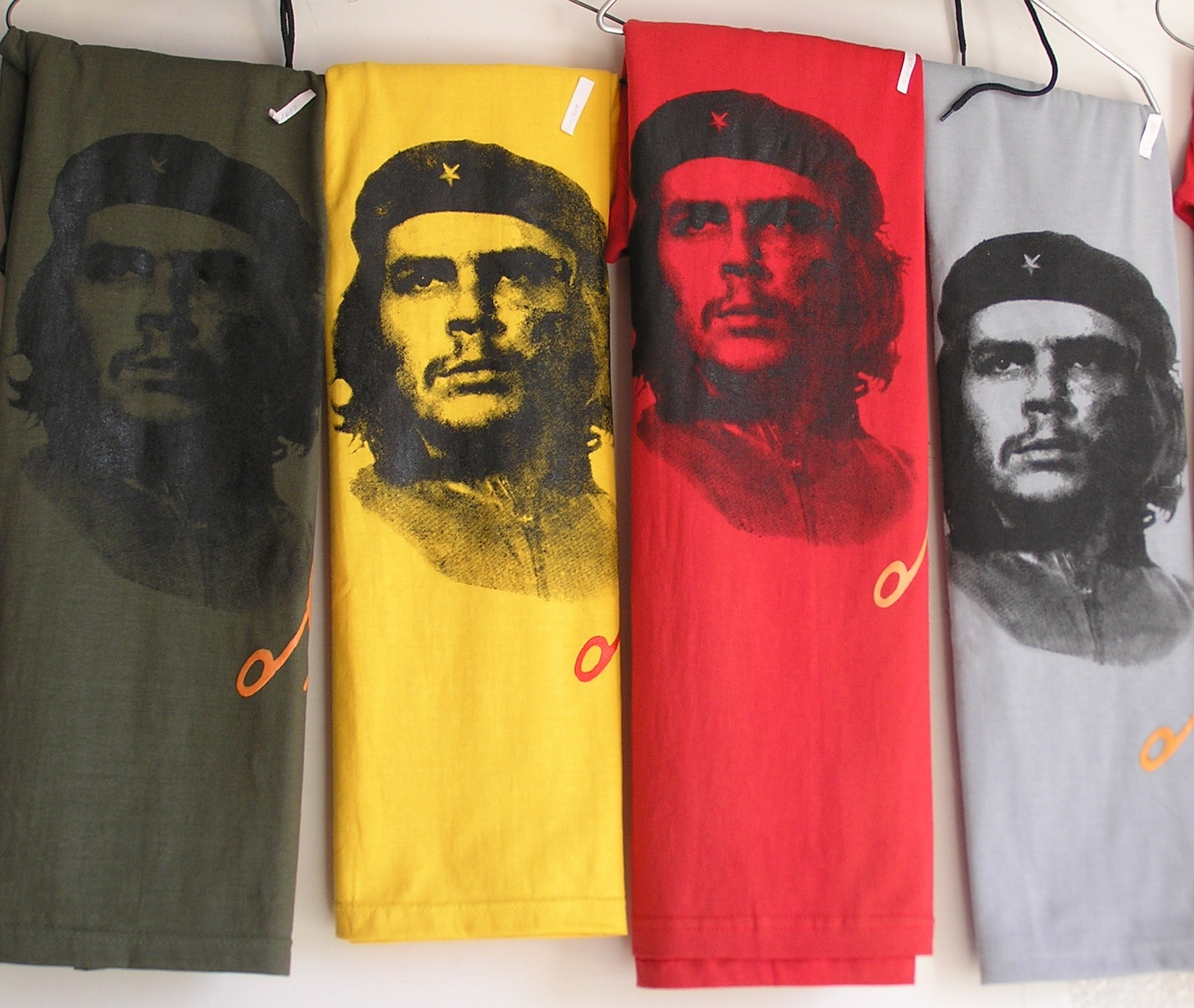
T-shirts for sale at the Museo de la Revolución gift shop in Havana, Cuba.

The Che image has been cited as an example of the merging of politics and marketing and the power that images hold over society. Trisha Ziff, the curator of a 2004 touring exhibition on the iconography of Che has stated that "Che Guevara has become a brand. And the brand's logo is the image, which represents change. It has become the icon of the outside thinker, at whatever level, whether it is anti-war, pro-green or anti-globalisation. Its presence, everywhere from Belfast to Soweto, or from walls in Palestine to Parisian boutiques, makes it an image that is out of control. It has become a corporation, an empire, at this point."

Alberto Korda's photograph has received wide distribution and modification, appearing on T-shirts, posters, consumer products, protest banners, personal tattoos, and in many other formats. It has become a countercultural symbol. The image is worn by a diverse group of individuals, from those who support the ideals of Che Guevara, to those expressing a more generalized anti-authoritarian stance.

== Iconography ==
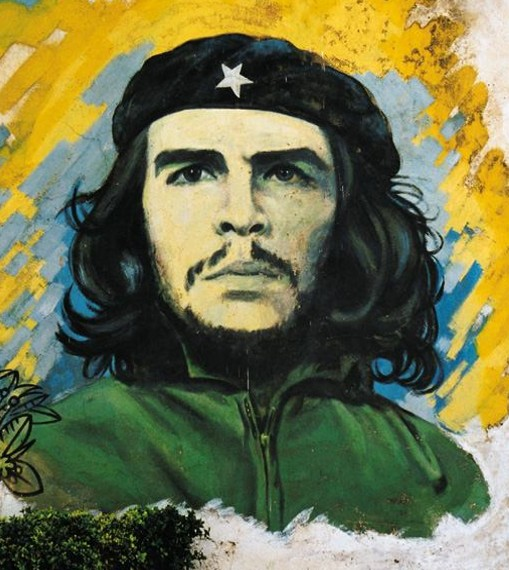
A mural of Guerrillero Heroico on the side of a house in Cuba.

If this were a photo session, you couldn't have asked for more. The model, long-haired with steely gaze and wispy guerrillero beard. Jacket zipped to the chin. Collar up and hair uncombed. Jaw set in anger. Beret at a perfect, rakish tilt. There's tension even in his pose: his shoulders turning one way, his face another. And those eyes, mournful but defiant, staring up and to the right as if at some distant vision of the future, or a giant, slow-approaching foe.

— Ben Ehrenreich, Los Angeles Times

Journalist Michael Casey, in his 2009 book Che's Afterlife: The Legacy of an Image, notes how the universal image can be found "in all corners of the world" and theorizes that it arrived as a symbol of rebellion during an era when the world was aching for change. In defining Korda's photograph as a "brand" and "quintessential post-modern icon", Casey notes that somehow the photograph encapsulates "hope and beauty", which causes people around the globe to "invest their dreams in it". While David Kunzle, author of the book Che Guevara: Icon, Myth, and Message, has opined that "The beret functions subliminally as a flattened halo."

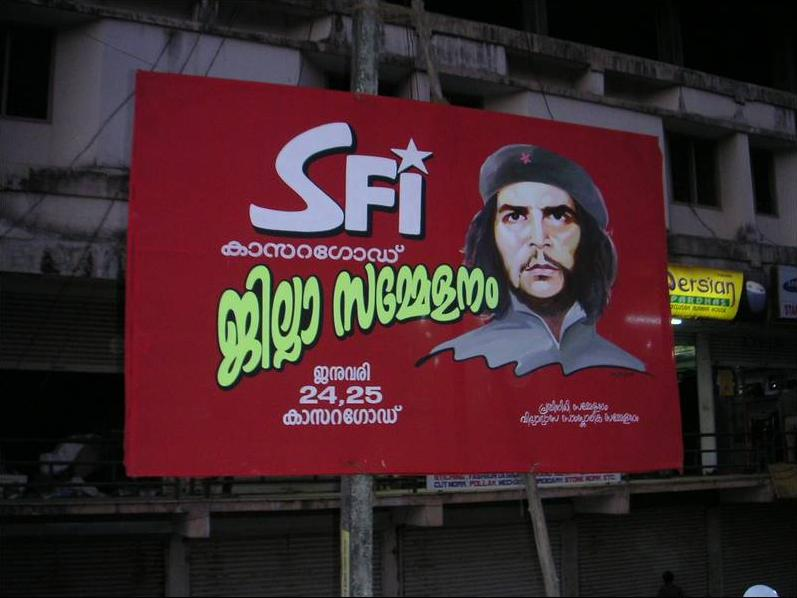
A Che banner in Kasargod, India, announcing the district conference for the Students Federation of India.

Trisha Ziff, the curator of Che! Revolution and Commerce describes Guerrillero Heroico as a "statuesque image taken from below", which "derives from a visual language of mythologized heroes harking back to an era of socialist realism" while referencing "a classical Christ-like demeanor". Jon Lee Anderson, author of Che Guevara: A Revolutionary Life, in the photograph Che appears "as the ultimate revolutionary icon" with "his eyes staring boldly into the future" and "his expression a virile embodiment of outrage at social injustice".

The stylized image of Che Guevara, adapted from Korda's photograph, is commonly accompanied by several different symbols that add context to its inherent suggested meaning. The most common of these are the red star, hammer and sickle, Cuban flag, and the saying in Spanish "Hasta la Victoria Siempre" (translation: "Towards Victory, Always"). The multi-meaning phrase became the sign off for Che Guevara's numerous letters and speeches as a revolutionary, and represent the commitment to both never give up on the eventual triumph of a Marxist world revolution, and the belief that this victory once it occurs, will be eternal. As a result, "Hasta la Victoria Siempre" has become a de facto slogan or catchphrase, used as a motto by those who continue to support and/or admire Che Guevara's life and/or ideals.

== Copyright status ==
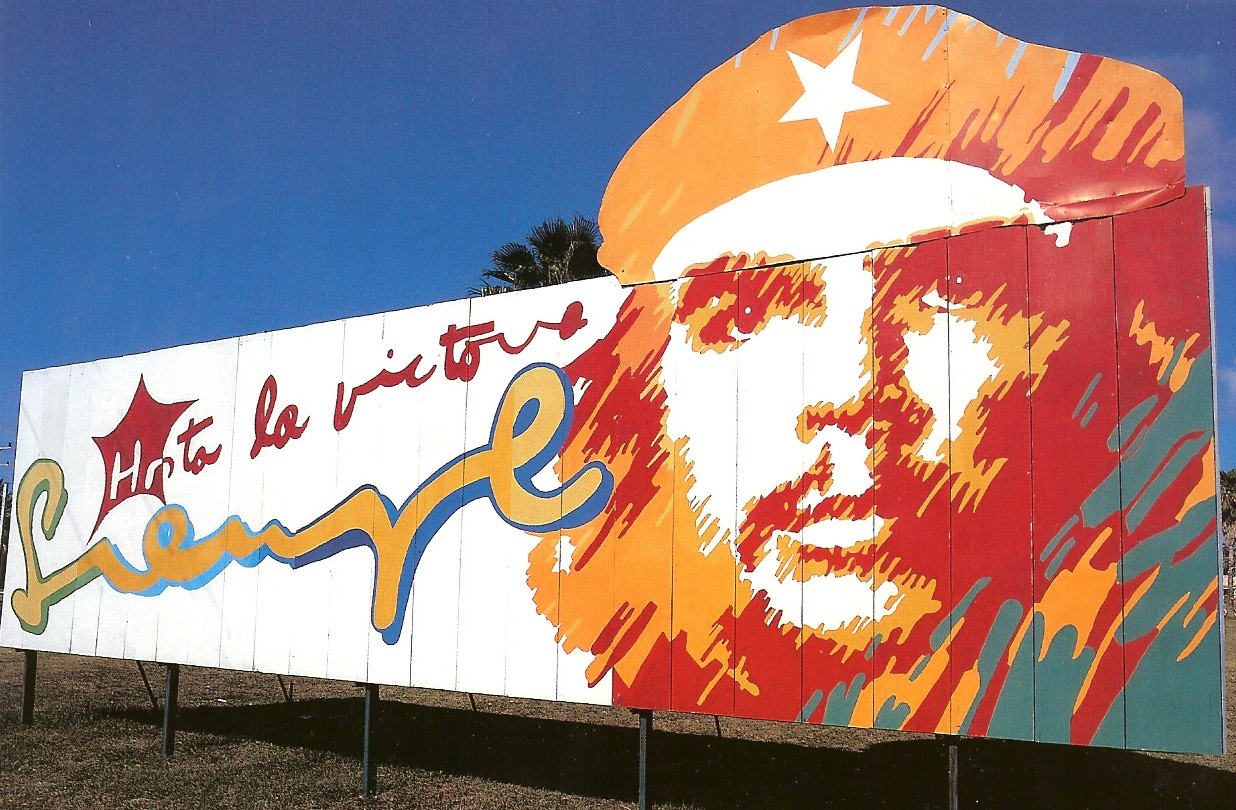
A 2009 highway billboard with Che's slogan of "Hasta la Victoria Siempre" (Towards Victory, Always).

For decades the famous image was unhindered by international copyright agreements, because Cuba was not a signatory to the Berne Convention. Fidel Castro described it as a bourgeois concept which meant that artists and advertisers were free to use Korda's work as they pleased. Legally, Cuban Law no. 156 signed on September 28, 1994, to amend part of Law no. 14 of the 1977 Copyright Act (Article 47), states that pictures taken in Cuba fall into the public domain worldwide, 25 years after their first use.

Despite conflicting claims about whether or not the image could have copyright established, Korda's children have sought to control commercial use of the image from defamation. Korda's daughter Diana Diaz pursued a 2003 lawsuit in France against a Paris-based press rights group Reporters Without Borders, for using the Che photograph in a poster campaign decrying Cuba as "the world's largest jail", aimed at dissuading French tourists from vacationing in Cuba after the jailing of 29 dissident journalists. In suing the group for €1.14 million, Diaz's lawyer, Randy Yaloz remarked that "we are going after everyone who betrays the moral rights of my client". Moral rights are a separate component of copyright law that are not recognized in the U.S., but are recognized in some other countries, notably in France where Diaz filed the lawsuit. Moral rights aim to protect the integrity of a work from defamation, distortion, slander, or offensive mutilation, even if the originator no longer owns the copyright. However, Reporters Without Borders stopped using the image before any legal judgment was rendered.

Ariana Hernández-Reguant addressed the image's copyright status in 2004 in her article Copyrighting Che: Art and Authorship under Cuban Late Socialism. She expressed a skeptical view towards Korda's heirs being able to establish ownership over the image, noting in reference to the lawsuits involving the image, "There was never any official ruling on whether the depiction constituted a violation of copyright." The author goes on to state that: "Korda took the picture while working for a state-run newspaper, his actual property rights would be questionable under both Cuban and international law."

"We're not after money, we just don't want him misused. He can be a universal person, but respect the image."

— Aleida Guevara, Che's daughter

Guevara's heirs also believe they have legal justification to prevent the image's "exploitation" or slander. Guevara's Cuban widow Aleida March stated in 2005 that "We have a plan to deal with the misuse. We can't attack everyone with lances like Don Quixote, but we can try to maintain the ethics of Guevara's legacy." In reference to this pronouncement, Guevara's daughter Aleida Guevara told Reuters, "It will be costly and difficult because each country has different laws, but a limit has to be drawn."

== See also ==
- List of photographs considered the most important

== Further reading and viewing ==
=== Books ===
- Alberto Korda: A Revolutionary Lens, by Diana Diaz & Mark Sanders, Steidl, 2007, ISBN 3-86521-458-4
- Che's Afterlife: The Legacy of an Image, by Michael Casey, Vintage Books USA, 2009, ISBN 0-307-27930-8
- Che Guevara: Revolutionary and Icon, by Trisha Ziff, Abrams Image, 2006, ISBN 0-8109-5718-3
- Che: Images of a Revolutionary, by Oscar Sola, Pluto Press, 2000, ISBN 0-7453-1700-6
- Che: The Photobiography of Che Guevara, Thunder's Mouth Press, 1998, ISBN 1-56025-187-5
- Cuba by Korda, by Christophe Loviny & Alberto Korda, Ocean Press (AU), 2006, ISBN 1-920888-64-0
- Self Portrait Che Guevara, by Ernesto Guevara & Victor Casaus, Ocean Press (AU), 2004, ISBN 1-876175-82-6

=== Films ===
- Che Guevara: Kordavision, 2008 (87 min). Directed by Hector Cruz Sandoval.
- Chevolution, 2008, Produced by Trisha Ziff & Directed by Luis Lopez, Red Envelope Entertainment.
- Personal Che, 2008, Directed by Adriana Mariño and Douglas Duarte.
